= Brookfield Zoo Chicago =

Zoo in Brookfield, Illinois, United States

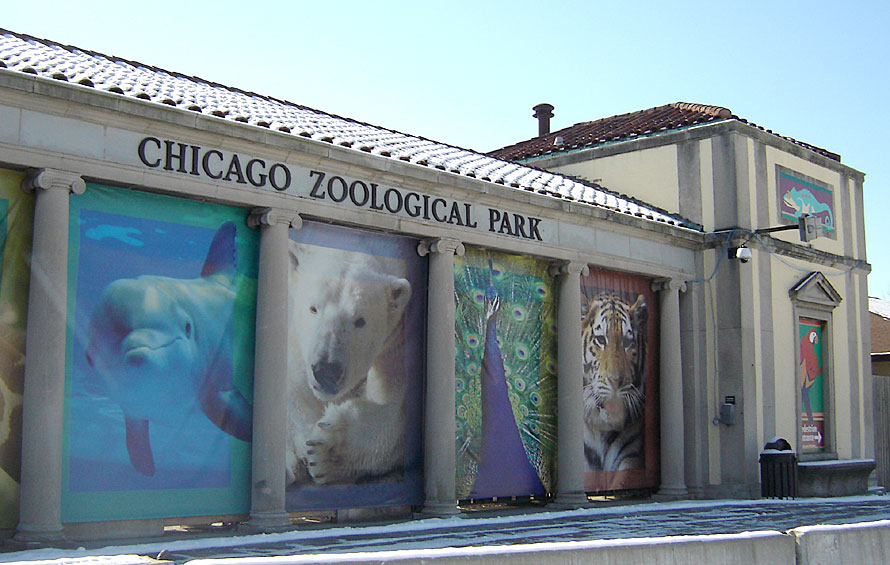
- Brookfield Zoo Chicago, North Gate
- Interactive map of Brookfield Zoo Chicago
- 41.832671°N 87.833462°W
- Date opened: July 1, 1934; 92 years ago
- Location: Brookfield, Illinois, United States
- Land area: 235 acres (95 ha)
- No. of animals: 3,481
- No. of species: 511
- Annual visitors: 2 million
- Memberships: AZA
- Public transit: Pace; BNSF Hollywood
- Website: www.brookfieldzoo.org

Brookfield Zoo Chicago, known until 2024 as simply Brookfield Zoo, and also known as the Chicago Zoological Park, is a zoo located in Brookfield, Illinois. Brookfield Zoo is owned by the Forest Preserve District of Cook County and is managed by the Chicago Zoological Society. It is the largest zoo in the Chicago metropolitan area and houses approximately 511 species of animals in an area of 216 acres (87 ha).

Brookfield Zoo opened on July 1, 1934, and quickly gained international recognition for using moats and ditches instead of cages. The zoo was also the first in the United States to exhibit giant pandas, one of which (Su Lin) has been taxidermied and put on display in Chicago's Field Museum of Natural History. In 1960 the zoo opened the first fully indoor bottlenose dolphin exhibit in the United States, and in the 1980s the zoo introduced the first fully indoor tropical rainforest simulation exhibit, which was the largest indoor zoo exhibit in the world at that time. It is often listed as one of the best zoos in the United States.

== History ==
=== 20th century ===
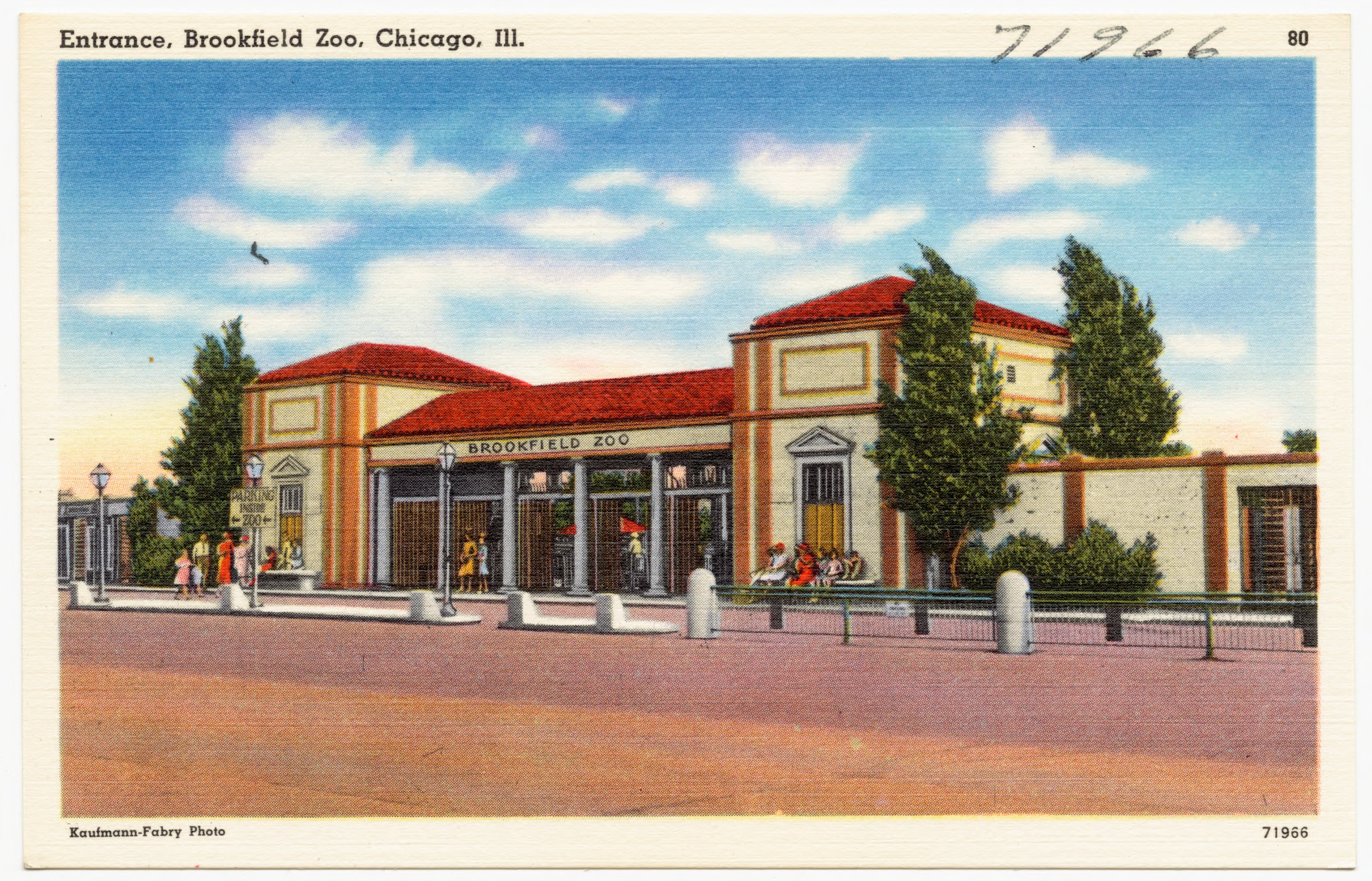
Entrance to Brookfield Zoo Chicago, c. 1930s

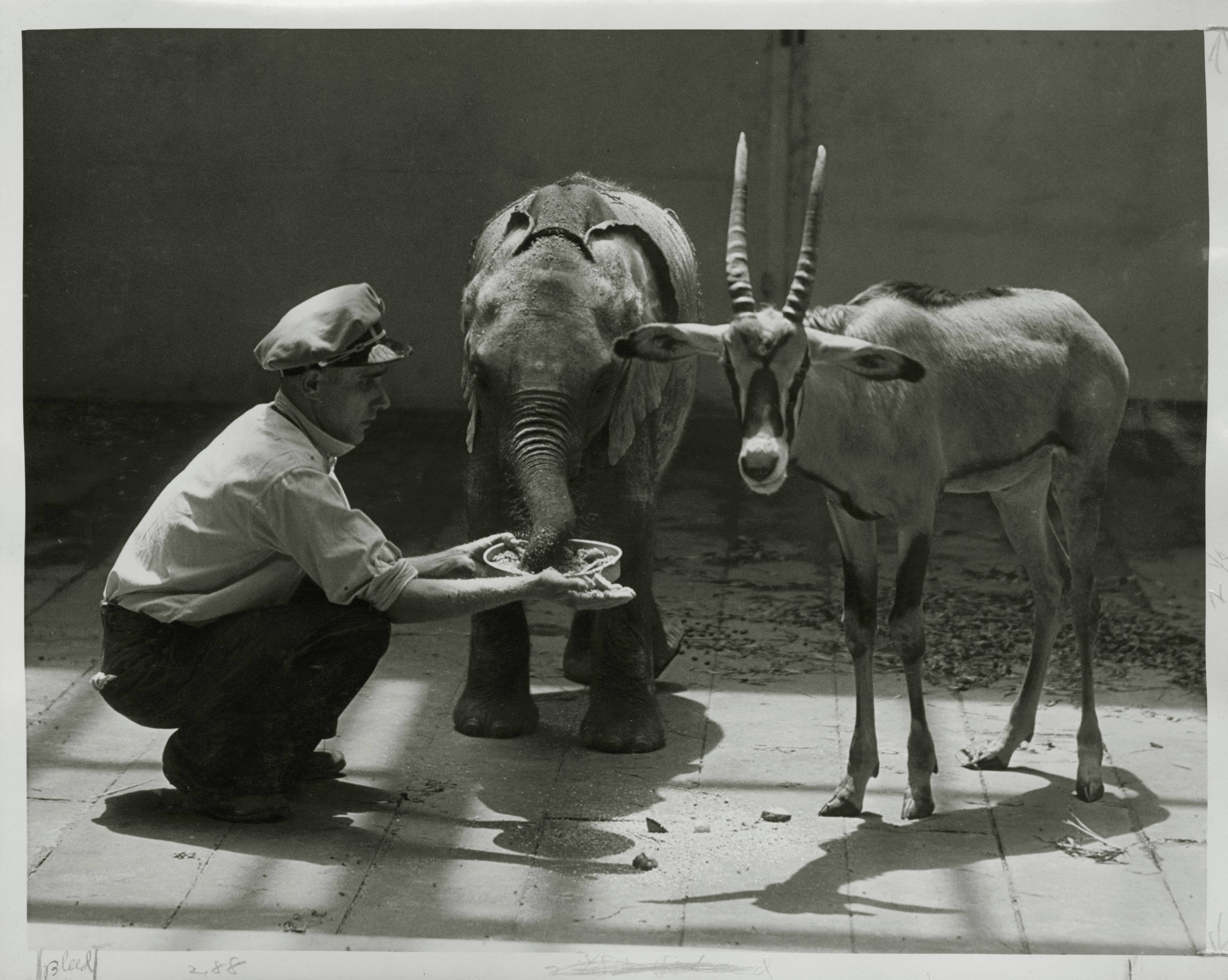
Zookeeper with baby animals, c. 1940s

In 1919, Edith Rockefeller McCormick donated land she received from her father as a wedding gift to the Cook County Forest Preserve District for development as a zoological garden. The district added 98 acres (400,000 m^{2}) to that plot and in 1921 the Chicago Zoological Society was established. Construction did not begin until 1926 after a zoo tax was approved. Construction slowed during the onset of the Great Depression, but regained momentum by late 1931. Construction went on at an increased pace and the zoo opened on July 1, 1934. By the end of September 1934, over one million people had visited the zoo; reaching four million by 1936.

The 1950s saw the addition of a veterinary hospital, a children's zoo, and the Roosevelt Fountain, named for U.S. president Theodore Roosevelt. The zoo experienced a decline in the 1960s until a large bond issue from the Forest Preserve District allowed it to expand. The zoo opened the nation's first fully indoor dolphinarium in the 1960s.

In the early 1980s, the zoo constructed Tropic World, an indoor simulated tropical rainforest exhibit. Tropic World was designed by French architect Pierre Venoa and was completed in 1984. In 1996, a 3-year-old boy was injured when he fell into an enclosure within Tropic World. The incident gained worldwide attention after Binti Jua, a female western lowland gorilla, tended to the child until zoo staff rescued him.

=== 21st century ===
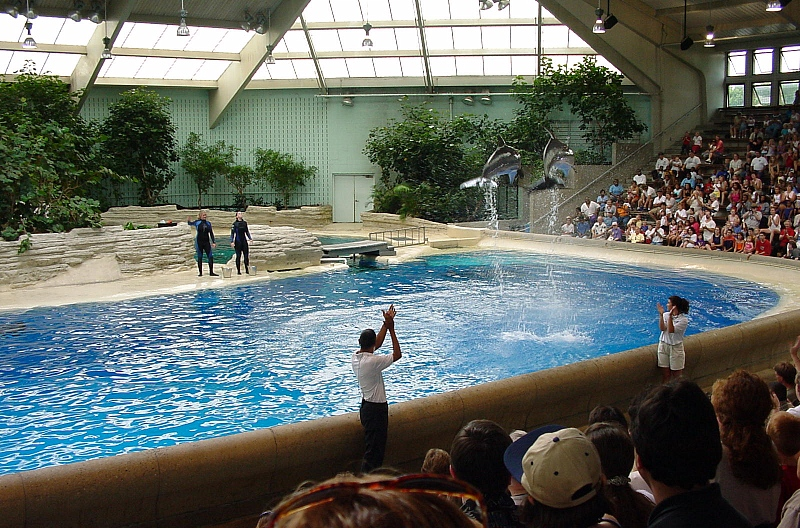
The Seven Seas Dolphinarium, c. 2000

In the early 21st century, the zoo underwent upgrades including construction of the Hamill Family Play Zoo, a large wolf exhibit, an interactive butterfly tent, group catering pavilions, and the largest non-restored, hand-carved, wooden carousel in the United States. Great Bear Wilderness, a $27.3 million exhibit for grizzly and polar bears, opened in 2010. The interiors of several existing buildings were reconfigured into immersion exhibits based upon ecosystems rather than by clades. These included exhibits related to South American coasts, swamps of the Southern United States, and various exhibits related to deserts, the African savanna, and the Australian Outback.

The zoo's reptile house, the first building to open in 1934, closed in 2005 and was converted into the Mary Ann McLean Conservation Leadership Center which does not display live animals, but it details the zoo's larger conservation mission.

In 2011, the zoo faced protests from In Defense of Animals over the deaths of their African elephants, and as a result Brookfield Zoo currently displays neither elephants or Nile hippopotamus (though the zoo's current master plan has both species expected to return in the coming years). The Children's Zoo, which opened in August 1953, was dismantled in early 2013, and a new family-based series of exhibits known as Wild Encounters opened on the site on July 1, 2015.

The zoo has been closed only five times in its history: On September 14, 2008, after damage from a weekend rainstorm; on February 2, 2011, after a major blizzard; on April 18–19, 2013, after flooding from a severe rainstorm; January 30–31, 2019, due to below-freezing temperatures;, from March 19 to July 1, 2020, due to the COVID-19 pandemic, and on January 12, 2024, due a winter storm.

In September 2023, the zoo received the largest private donation in its history, $40 million, from an anonymous donor.

As a result of this private donation, the zoo utilized the money to fund their newest expansion to Tropic World, this being Tropical Forests. Said expansion will not only provide outdoor exhibits for monkeys, gorillas, and orangutans alike, but also providing them with new indoor exhibits as well. There is also a plan of introducing two new bachelor gorillas to the existing dynamic, originally from Zoo Miami. The opening date was July 11, 2025. Tropical Forests is a part of Brookfield Zoo Chicago's current master plan.

In 2024, a ferris wheel was set up near the east mall to celebrate the zoo's 90th anniversary. It has returned for the 2025 season.

== Notable animals (past and present) ==
- Binti Jua is a female western lowland gorilla who tended to a three-year-old child that fell into her exhibit in 1996.
- Cookie, a Major Mitchell's cockatoo, had been part of the zoo's collection since the opening in 1934, until his death in 2016.
- Ziggy was a 6-ton male Asian elephant who was chained in the Pachyderm House for three decades, due to him attacking his keeper in 1941.

== Exhibits ==
- Australia: Bennett's wallabies, brush-tailed bettong, Cape Barren goose, emus, frilled lizard, green tree pythons, laughing kookaburras, short-beaked echidnas, southern hairy-nosed wombats, western grey kangaroos, and woma pythons.
- Big Cats: African lions, Amur tigers, sloth bears, and snow leopards.
- Clouded Leopard Rain Forest: Asian small-clawed otters, binturongs, clouded leopard, emperor newts, Prevost's squirrel, and ring-tailed lemurs.
- Desert's Edge: Amur leopards, Arabian sand cats, bat-eared foxes, Damaraland mole-rats, Cape porcupines, meerkats, naked mole rats, Pallas cat, small-spotted genet, and white-nosed coatimundis.
- Feathers and Scales: Andean condors, Andean cock-of-the-rock, blue-billed curassow, crested wood partridge, yellow-headed dart poison frogs, double-striped thick-knees, Gambel's quails, greater roadrunners, green aracaries, boa constrictors, sungazers, western Gaboon viper, and Victoria crowned pigeon.
- Formal Pool: American white pelican.
- Great Bear Wilderness: American bison, bald eagles, brown bears, and polar bears.
- Habitat Africa: The Forest: African dwarf crocodile, black and rufous giant elephant shrew, African red-billed hornbill, okapis, red-flanked duikers, red river hogs, white-bellied pangolins, and yellow-backed duikers.
- Habitat Africa: The Savannah: African wild dogs, dwarf mongooses, grey crowned cranes, klipspringers, Kirk's dik-dik, nyala antelope, and reticulated giraffes.
- Hamill Family Nature Plaza (seasonal): Blanding's turtle, common musk turtle, eastern box turtle, ornate box turtle, painted turtle, red-eared slider turtle, spotted turtle, and three-toed box turtle.
- Hamill Family Play Zoo: African hedgehogs, barred tiger salamanders, Blanding's turtles, musk turtles, boa constrictors, African cichlids, honeybees, koalas, Madagascar hissing cockroaches, Plymouth Rock chickens, red-legged seriema, toco toucans, and Wyandotte chickens.
- Hamill Family Wild Encounters: Goats, llamas, parakeets, red pandas, reindeer, and Bennett's wallabies.
- Hoofed Animals: Addaxes, Bactrian camels, and Grevy's zebras.
- Macaws: Blue-and-yellow macaws, scarlet macaws, and hyacinth macaws.
- North American Prairie Aviary: Cattle egret, greater prairie chicken, and sandhill crane.
- Pachyderms: Capybaras, Galapagos tortoise, and Eastern black rhinoceros.
- Regenstein Wolf Woods: Mexican wolves.
- Reptiles and Birds (Perching Bird House): African pygmy-falcons, Argus monitors, Bali starlings, bay-headed tanagers, blue throated macaw, curl-crested aracari, green-winged macaws, Jamaican iguana, Micronesian kingfishers, paradise tanagers, reticulated python, tawny frogmouths, turquoise tanagers, and veiled chameleon.
- Salt Creek Wilderness: Trumpeter swans.
- Sea Lion Cove: California sea lions, grey seals.
- Seven Seas: Bottlenose dolphins.
- The Living Coast: Axolotls, blue tang, clownfish, cownose rays, dwarf seahorses, gray gulls, Humboldt penguins, Inca terns, Kemp's ridley sea turtle, leopard sharks, moon jellyfish, and moray eels.
- The Swamp: American flamingos, Blanding's turtle, great egrets, little blue herons, North American river otter, roseate spoonbills, scarlet ibis, snowy egrets, and white ibis.
- Tropic World: Angola colobus, Asian small-clawed otters, Boat-billed heron, Black-handed spider monkey, Bornean orangutans, collared mangabeys, cottontop tamarins, giant anteaters, Geoffroy's spider monkeys, golden lion tamarins, Hoffmann's two-toed sloth, mandrills, northern white-cheeked gibbons, Schmidt's red-tailed guenon, squirrel monkeys, sooty mangabeys, tufted capuchin, crested capuchin, and western lowland gorillas.

=== Temporary exhibits ===
- Dinosaurs Alive!, Series 1 (2009): Allosaurus, Apatosaurus, Baryonyx, Deinonychus, Dilophosaurus, Metriacanthosaurus, Omeisaurus, Parasaurolophus, Protoceratops, Pteranodon, Ruyangosaurus, Stegosaurus, Triceratops, Tyrannosaurus rex, and Yangchuanosaurus.
- Xtreme BUGS! (2012): African fat-tail scorpion, Army ant, Asian giant hornet, Atlas moth, Black corsair, Brown marmorated stink bug, Chinese earth tiger tarantula, European honeybee, Giant vinegaroon, Golden orb weaver, Hine's emerald dragonfly, Leafcutter ant, Madagascar hissing cockroach, Monarch butterfly, Orchid mantis, Periodic cicada, Peruvian giant centipede, Praying mantis, Red imported fire ant, Red-eyed devil katydid, Seven-spotted ladybug, and Siafu.
- Dinosaurs Alive!, Series 2 (2013): Alxasaurus, Amargasaurus, Carnotaurus, Confuciusornis, Dyoplosaurus, Gigantoraptor, Kosmoceratops, Microraptor, Olorotitan, Pachycephalosaurus, Shantungosaurus, Sinosauropteryx, Spinosaurus, Styracosaurus, Tuojiangosaurus, and Velociraptor.
- Dinosaurs Alive!, Series 3 (2017): Ankylosaurus, Dracorex hogwartsia, Megalosaurus, Quetzalcoatlus, and Utahraptor.
- Dragons! (2017): Chinese Dragon, Dragon, Gryphon, Unicorn, and Wyvern.
- Amazing Arachnids! (2018): Blue femur beauty tarantula, Brazilian blue violet tarantula, Brazilian pink bloom tarantula, Brazilian red and white tarantula, Burgundy goliath birdeater, Colombian pumpkin patch tarantula, Chaco golden knee, Chilean gold dust spider, Chiricahuan grey, Curly hair tarantula, Desert hairy scorpion, Dictator scorpion, Dwarf Philippine tangerine, Emperor scorpion, Entre Rios tarantula, Feather leg baboon tarantula, Giant flat rock scorpion, Ghost ornamental tarantula, Goliath bird-eating tarantula, Goliath pinkfoot tarantula, Guatemalan tiger rump tarantula, Mahogany tree spider, Metallic pink toe tarantula, Mexican fireleg tarantula, Mexican red knee tarantula, Mozambique golden baboon tarantula, Olive keeled flat rock scorpion, Ornamental baboon tarantula, Peacock tarantula, Purple earth tarantula, Purple tree spider, Rameshwaram Temple tarantula, Skeleton leg tarantula, South Vietnam blue tarantula, Stripe knee tarantula, Tailless whip scorpion, Tiger rump tarantula, Venezuelan suntiger tarantula, Vinegaroon, Wolf spider, and Yellow-backed ornamental tiger tarantula.
- Brick Safari! (2019): Various life-sized animal-themed Lego sculptures.
- Dinosaurs Alive!, Series 4 (2020): Argentinosaurus, Azhdarcho, Cryolophosaurus, Datousaurus, Gallimimus, Maiasaura, Majungasaurus, Pentaceratops, Rapetosaurus, Shunosaurus, Tarchia, Tenontosaurus, and Troodon.
- Ice Age Giants! (2022): Castoroides, Cave lion, Cuvieronius, Diprotodon, Dire wolf, Giant cheetah, Giant hyena, Giant lemur, Giant moa, Giant polar bear, Gigantopithecus, Glyptodon, Hippidion, Irish elk, Josephoartigasia, Macrauchenia, Mastodon, Megatherium, Phorusrhacos, Procoptodon, Short-faced bear, Smilodon, Teratornis, Thylacine, Thylacoleo, Toxodon, Wonambi, Woolly mammoth, and Woolly rhinoceros.
- Glow Wild! (2026): Various life-sized animal themed Chinese lantern sculptures.
- Dinosaurs Alive!, Series 5 (2026): Brachiosaurus, Edmontosaurus, and Gastonia.

== Notable staff ==
Chicago cartoonist John T. McCutcheon was the president of the Chicago Zoological Society from 1921 until 1948 and oversaw the zoo's construction, opening and its early years, including helping it through the war years, when the zoo saw a decrease in attendance.

Grace Olive Wiley briefly worked as a reptile curator at the zoo in 1935.

George B. Rabb was the director from 1976 until 2003, having originally worked as a researcher and an assistant to the director.

== Conservation programs ==
Brookfield Zoo Chicago has a conservation project in Punta San Juan, Peru. Disney World partnered with the zoo by giving a $25,000 grant assigned specifically to the work in Punta San Juan, Peru, which helped the Chicago Zoological Society conservationists gain clearance into the highly restricted and protected area. The CZS has hired multiple people that already worked for the reserve to help build a conservation research team. Samples are taken from wildlife such as South American sea lions, Inca terns, Peruvian boobies, guanay cormorants, Grey gulls, and the endangered Humboldt penguins. The team uses the information they gathered to research the environment, observe the species, and monitor populations. Project results further knowledge about the ocean and help save endangered species. Team members also continuously have groups of children, of varying ages, go out to clean up garbage that accumulates on the beaches of Punta San Juan from the Pacific Ocean.

== Economics ==
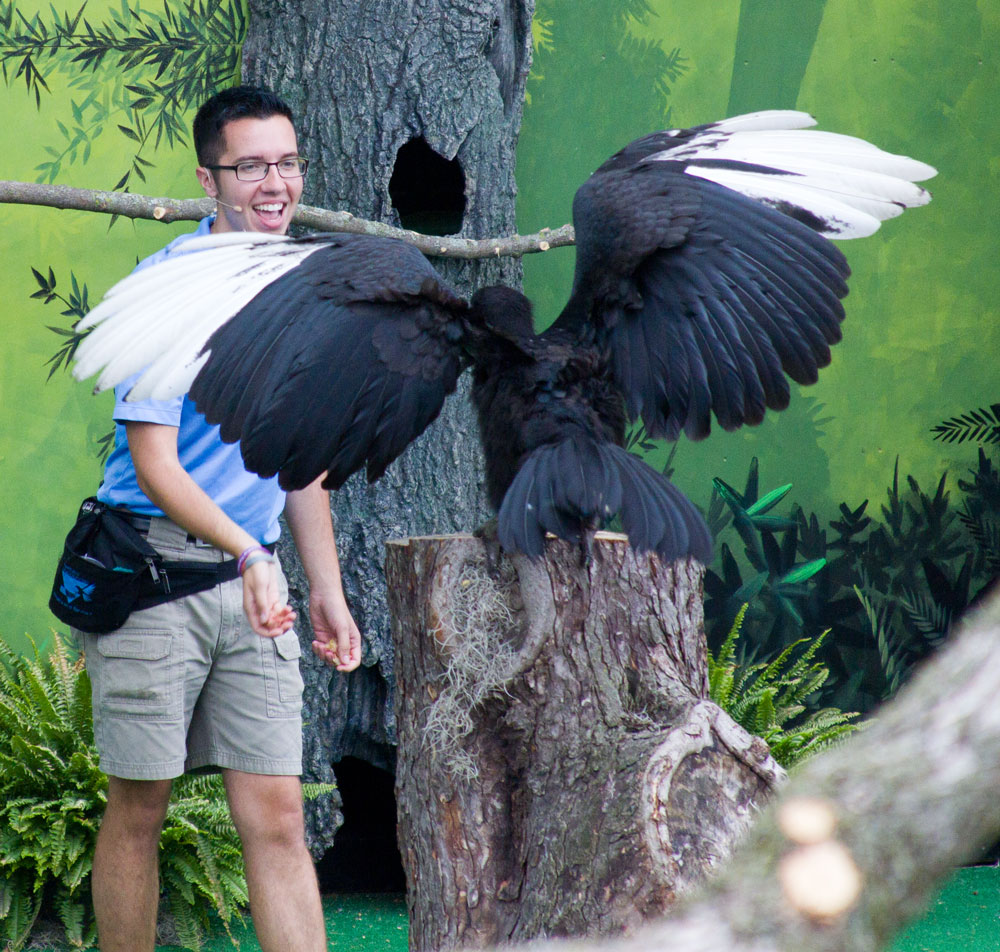
Ground hornbill (Bucorvidae) with trainer

In 2014, revenue of Brookfield Zoo Chicago was made up by $26.6 million from admissions and guest services, $15.2 million from taxes, $11.5 million from membership dues, $11.5 million from contributions, sponsorships, and net assets released, and $1.2 million from investments and other income. Expenses in 2014 included $15.7 million for admissions and guest services, $15 million for animal collections and conservation programs, $10.7 million for care of buildings and grounds, $7.9 million for management and general, $5.9 million for public education and communications, $3.8 million for marketing and public relations, $3.4 million for fundraising, and $1.4 million for membership. Revenue totaled $66 million and spending totaled $63.8 million during 2014.

In 2010, Governor Pat Quinn granted Brookfield Zoo Chicago $15.6 million to aid repairing and remodeling many parts of the zoo. This included updating the north entrance to the zoo on 31st Street and Golfview Avenue.

The CZS has hosted several fundraising events, Wines in the Wild and Wild Wild Whirl, where they collected various donations ranging in totals from $130,000 to $1.5 million.

A total of 808 volunteers help the zoo with 74,401 community service hours, which equates to $1.86 million of work.

Economic movement approaches $150 million, 2,000 jobs, 580 volunteers, and around 2 million visitors every year.

== Gallery ==
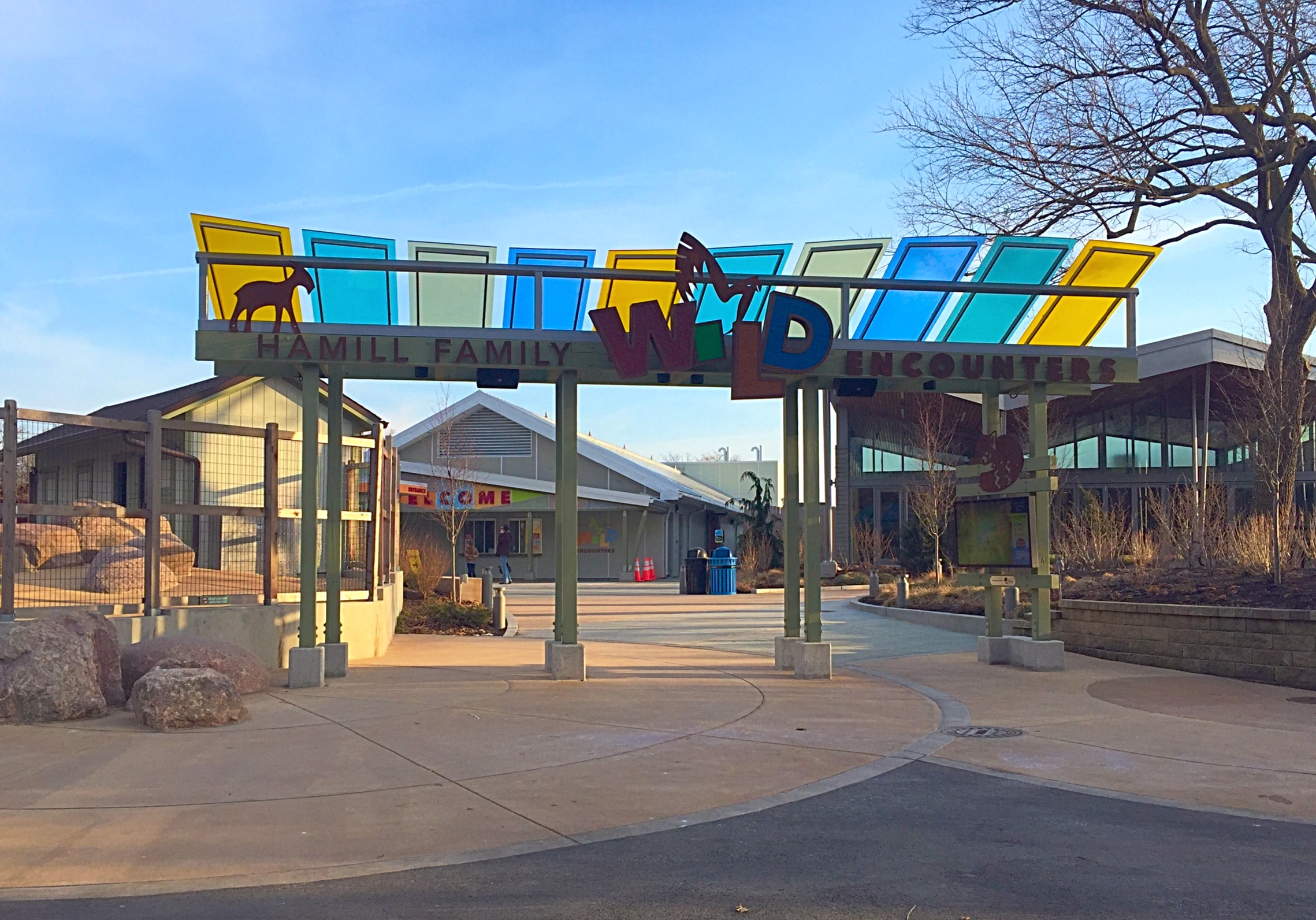
Hamill Family Wild Encounters entrance

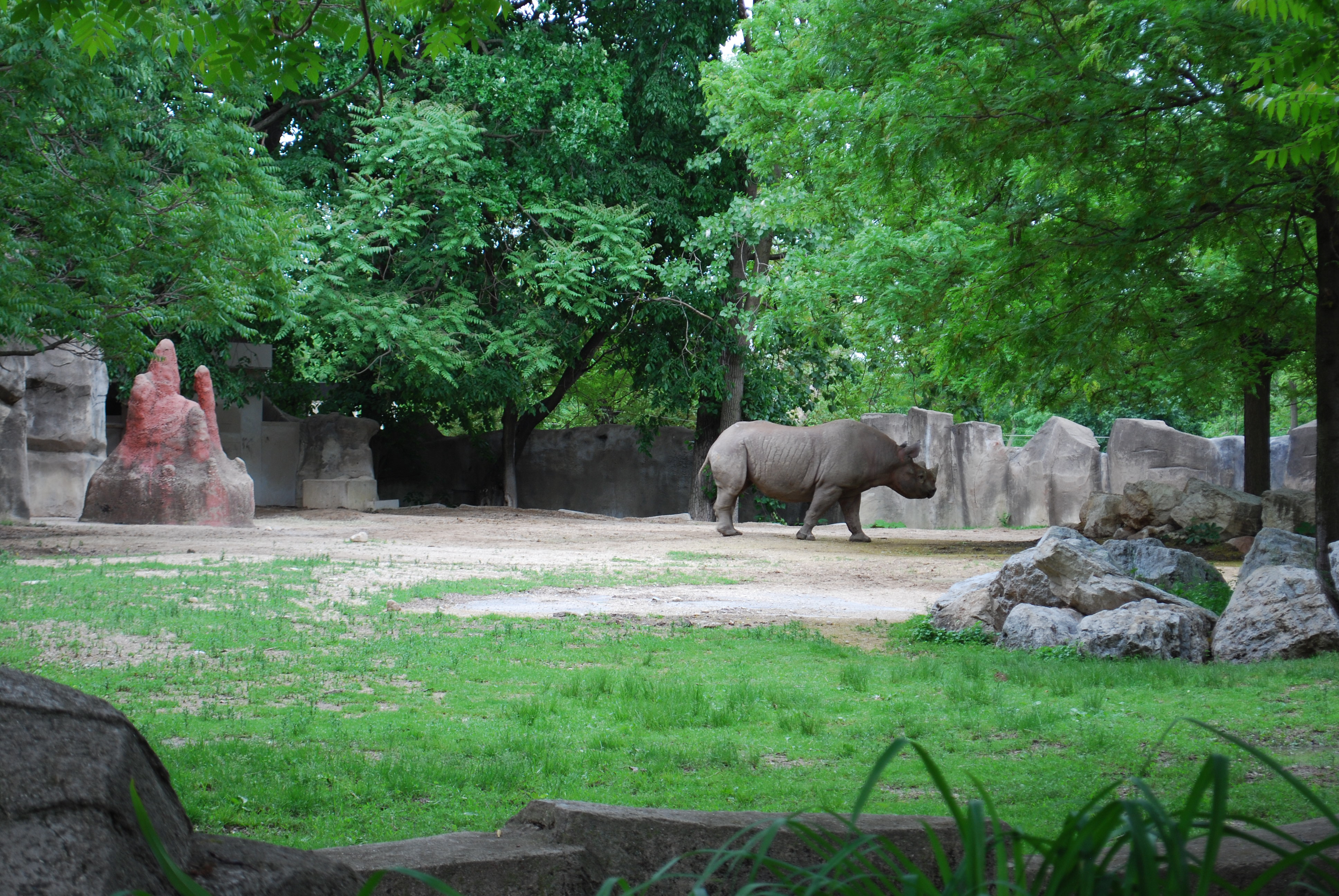
Rhino exhibit

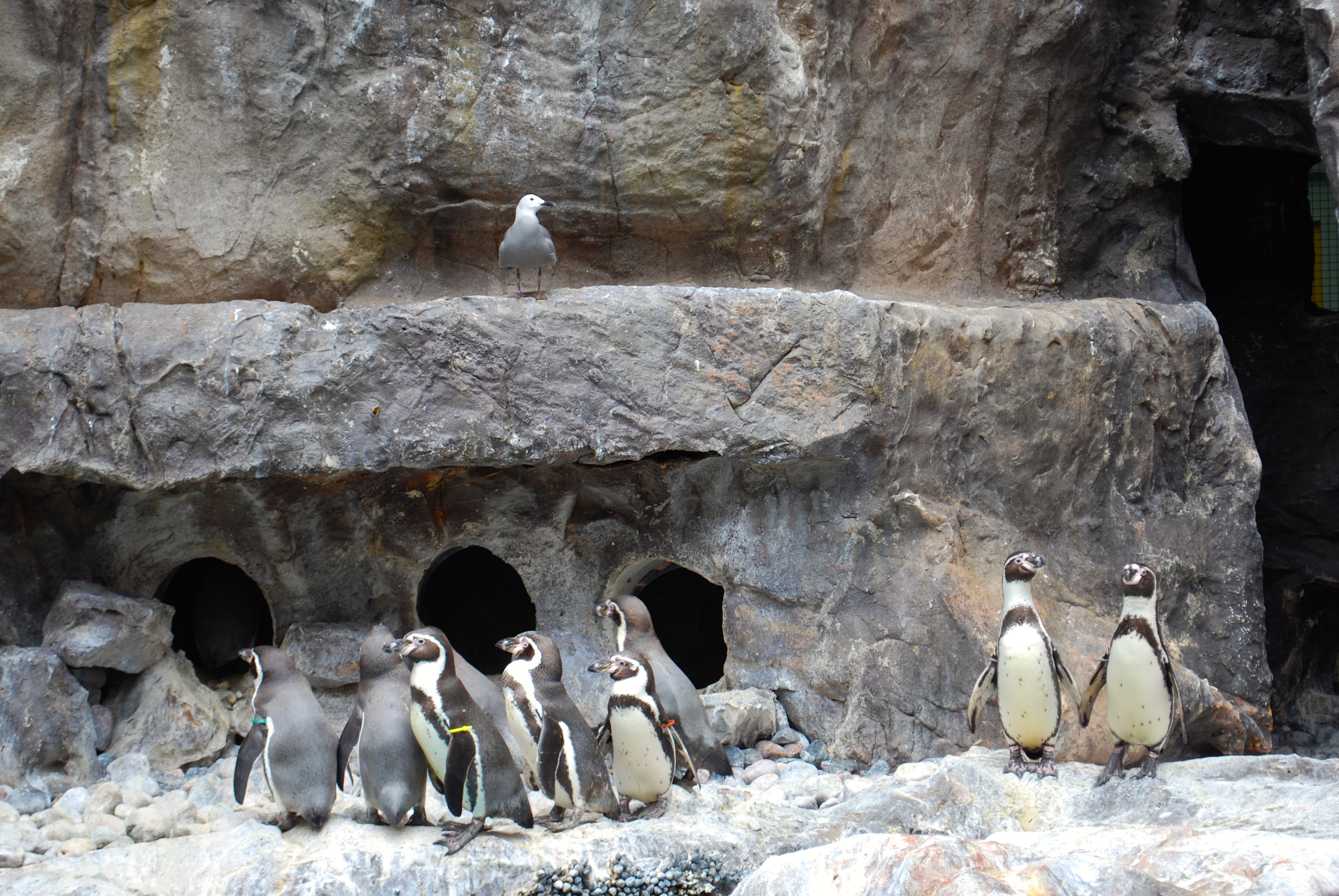
Humboldt penguins at the Living Coast exhibit

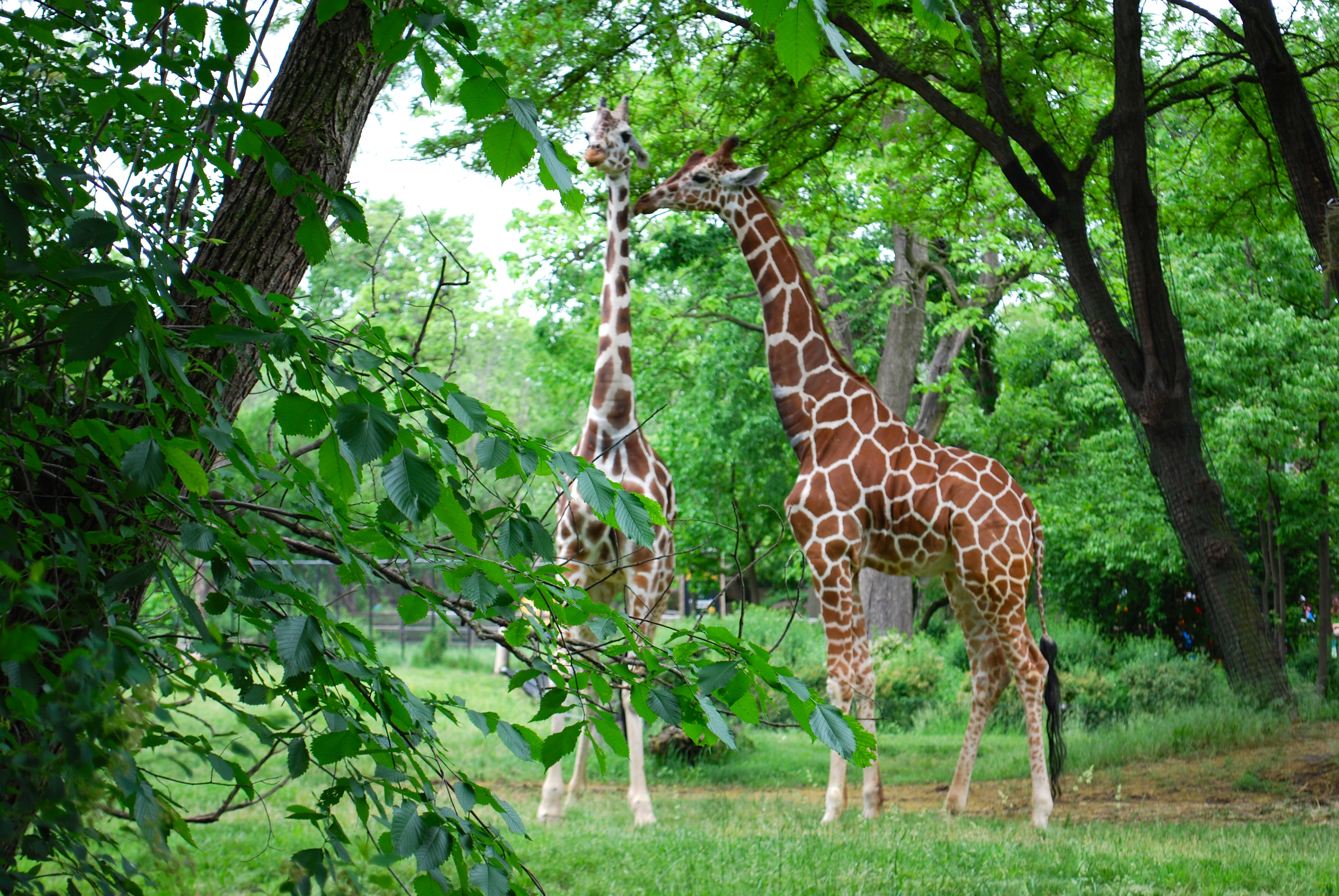
Giraffes (Giraffa camelopardalis reticulata)

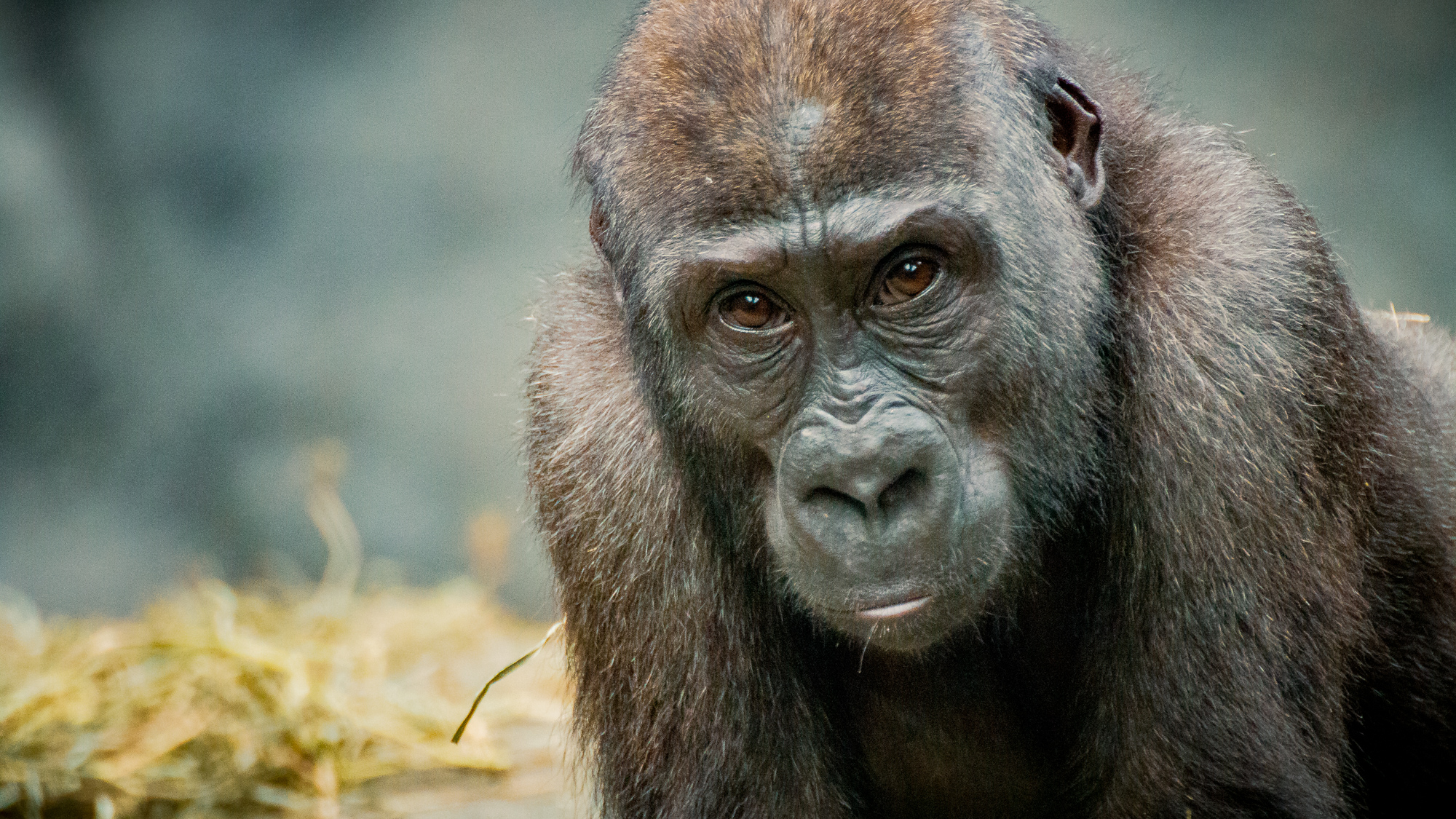
Gorilla at the zoo

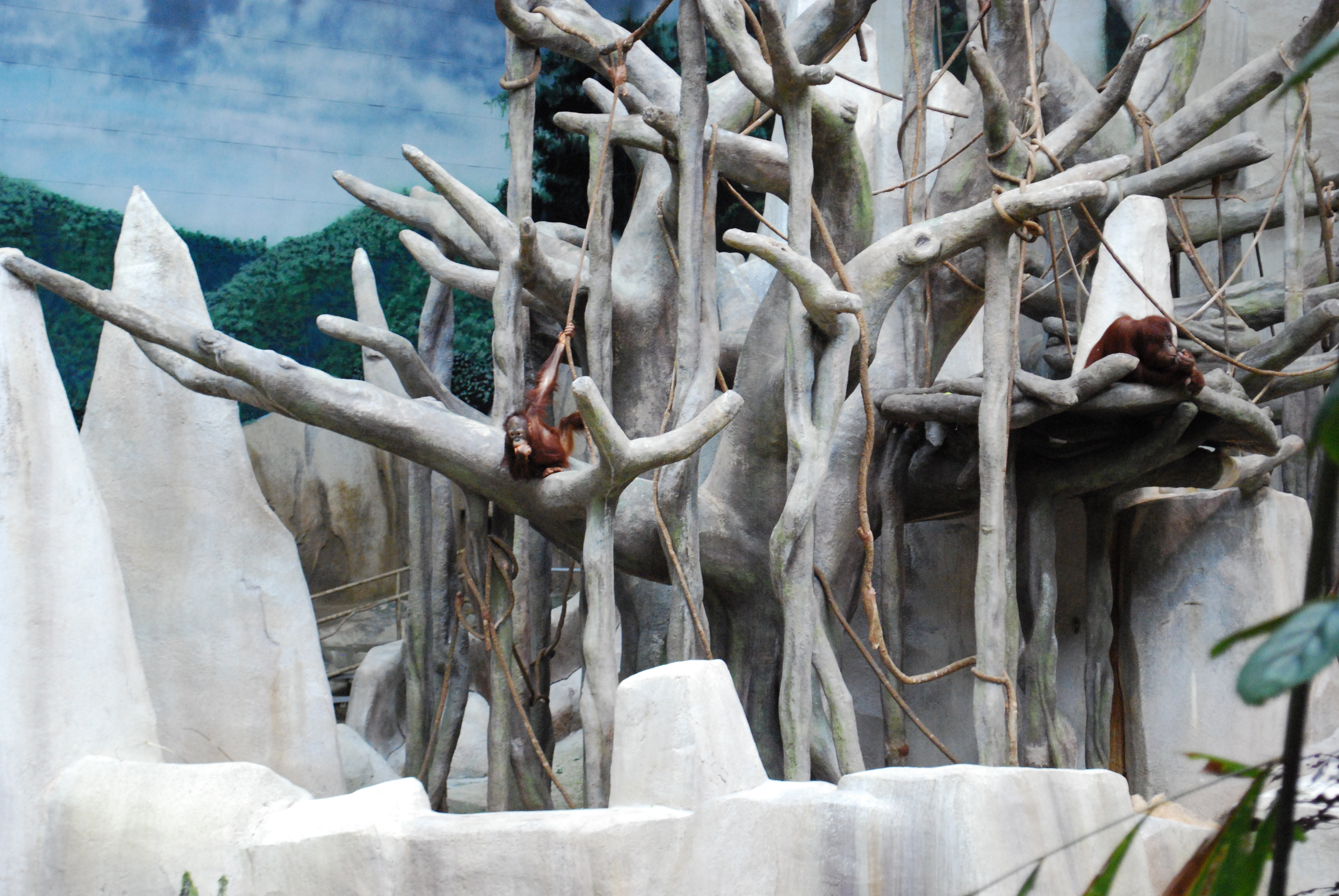
Orangutans

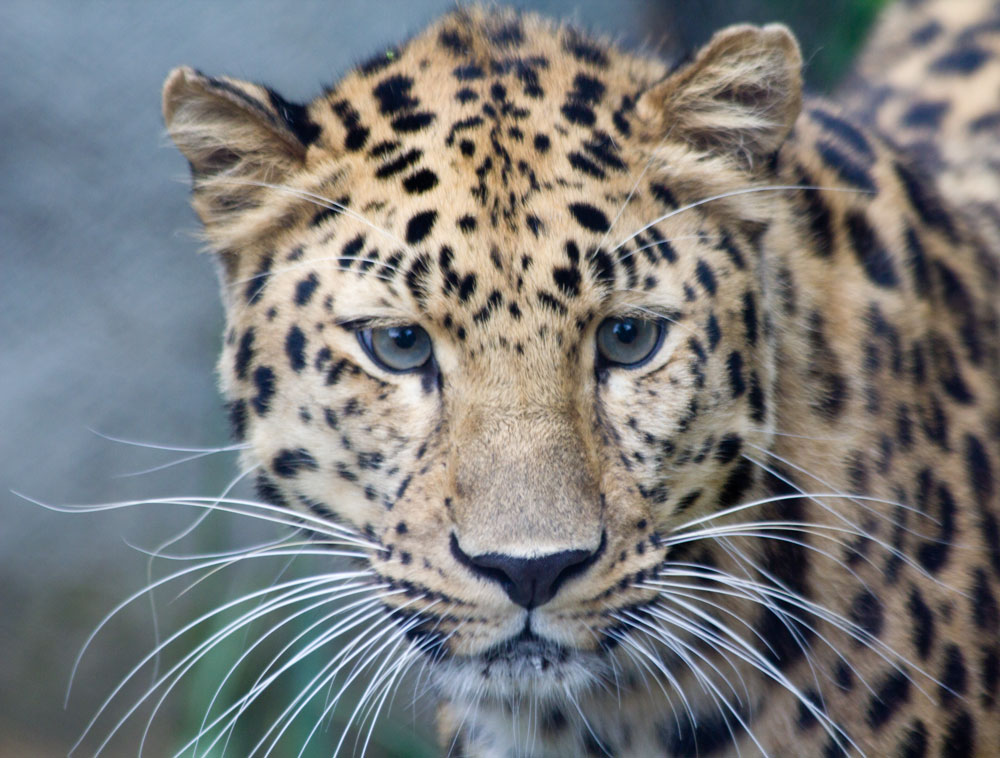
Amur leopard

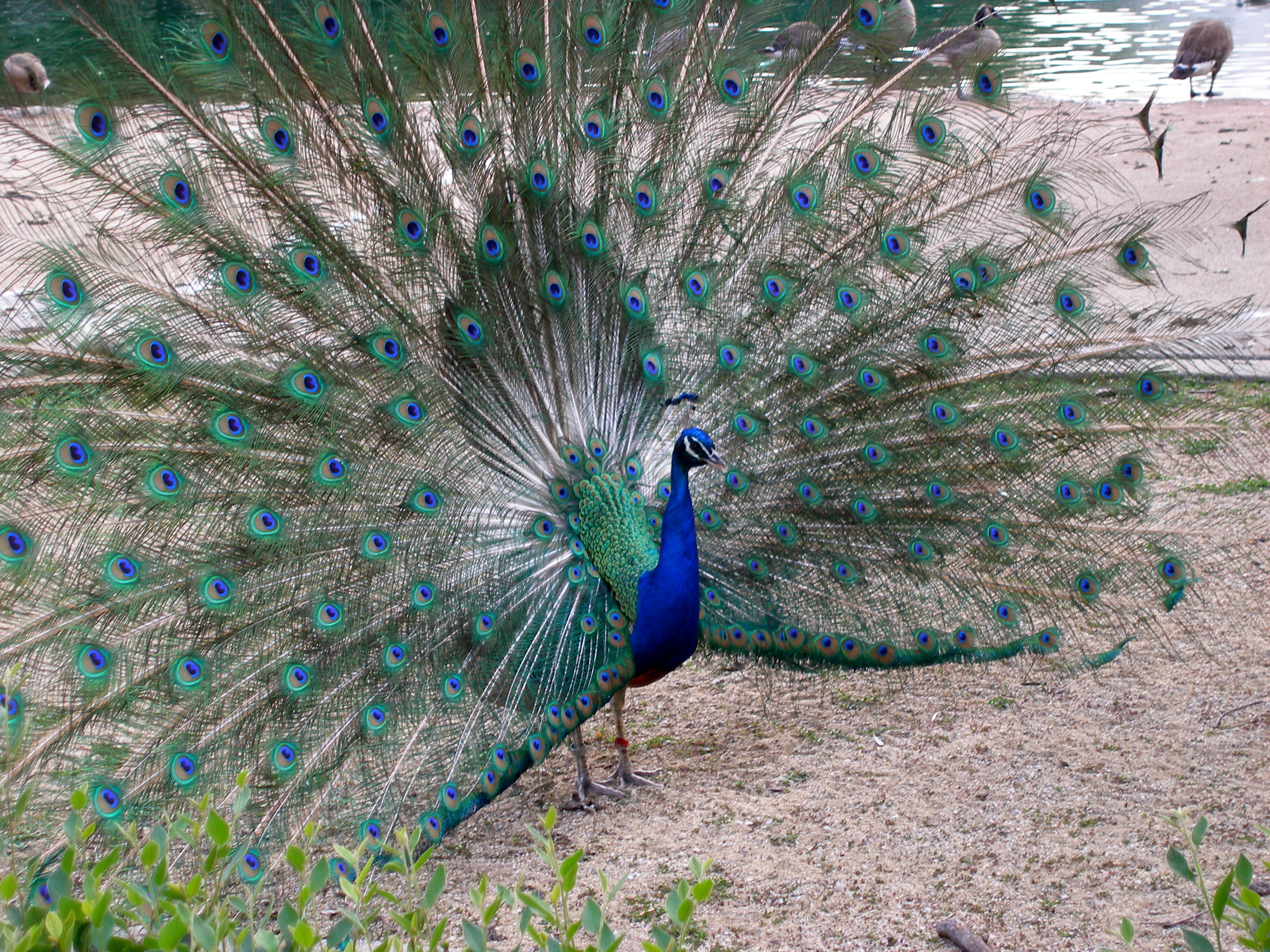
Peacock near pond

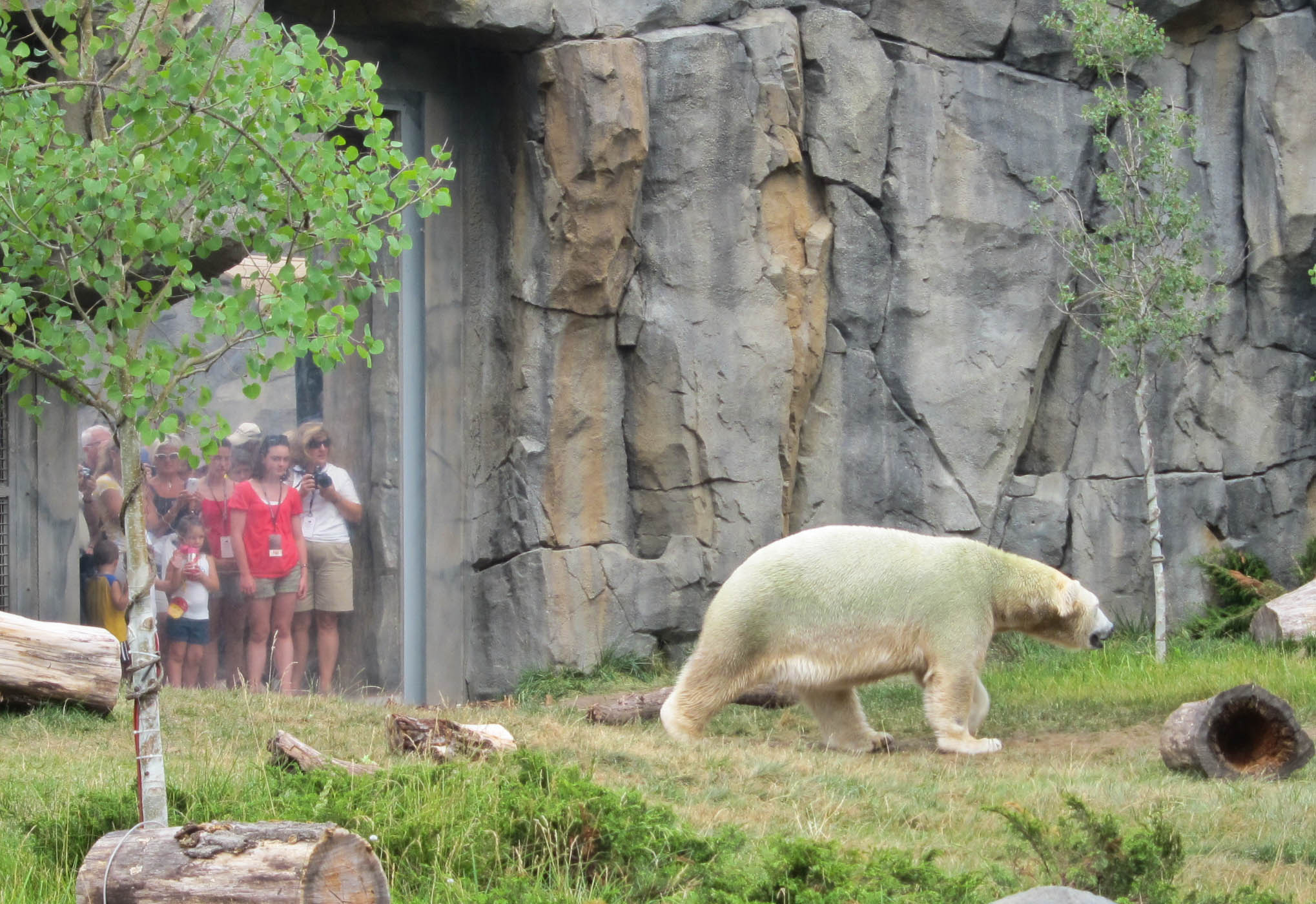
Polar bear exhibit

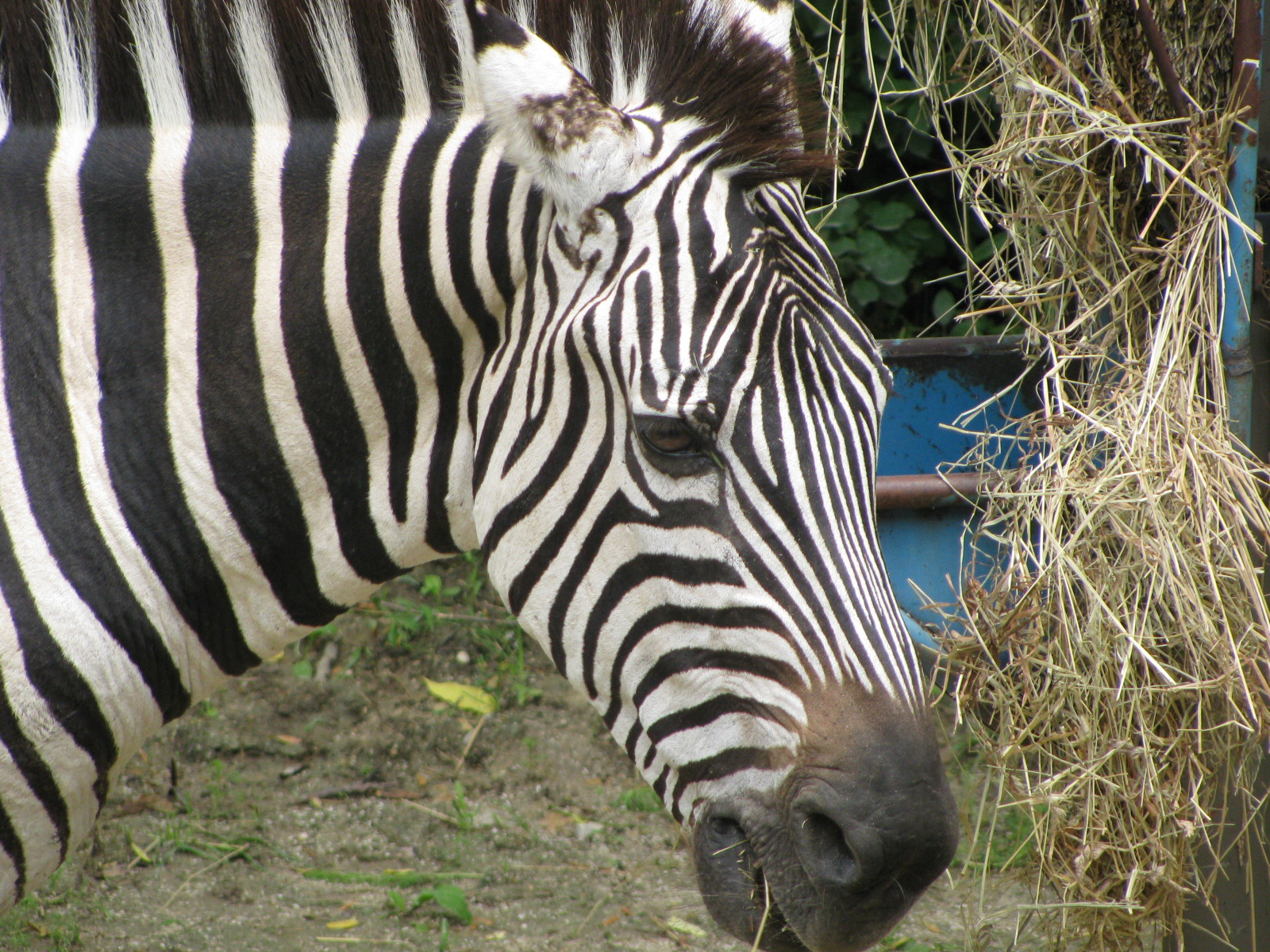
Zebra feeding on hay

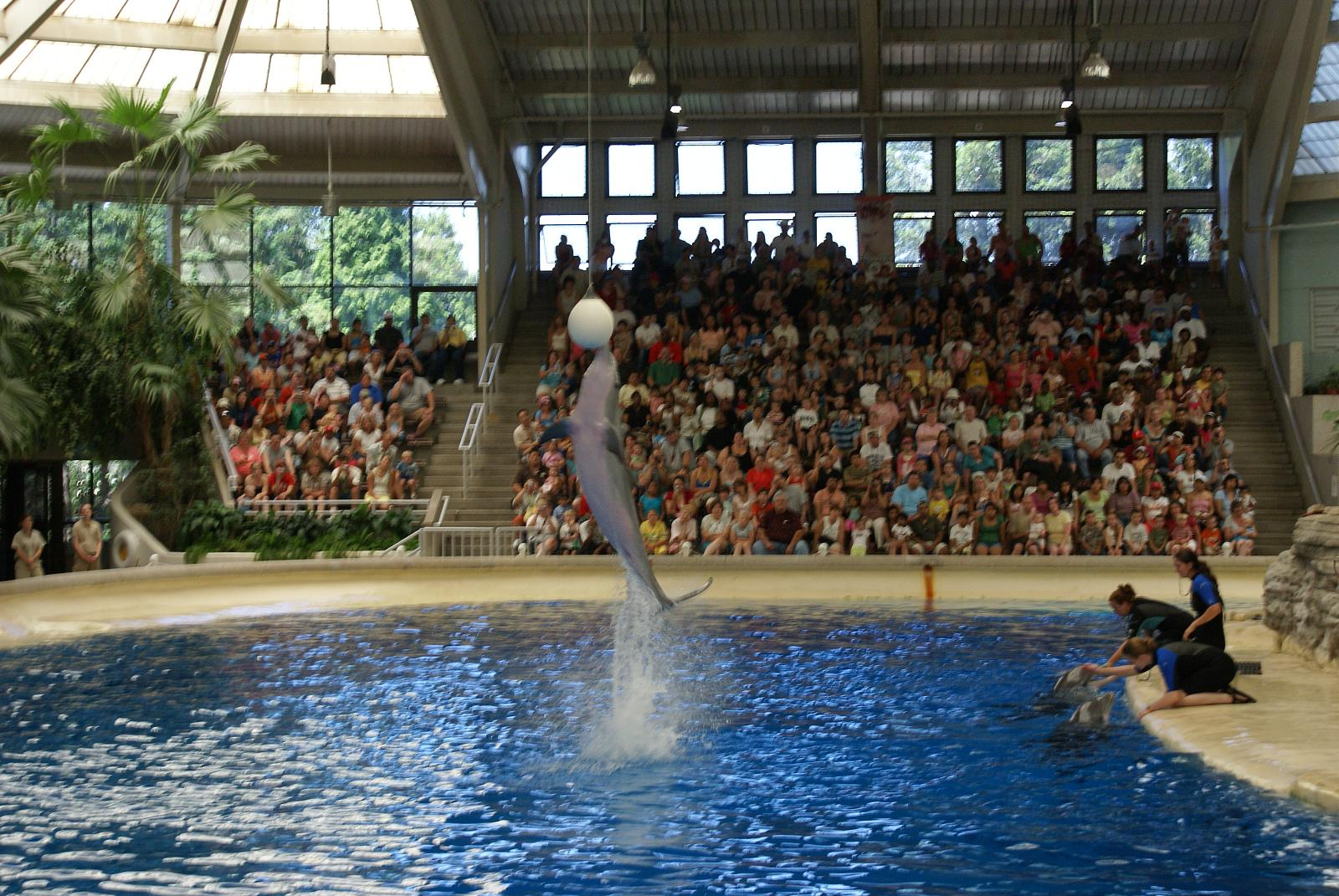
Dolphin show

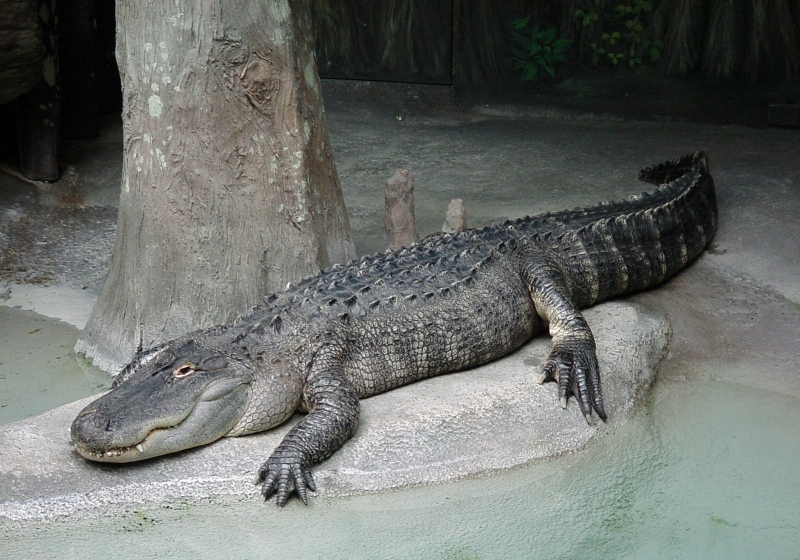
American alligator (Alligator mississippiensis)

Old exit turnstiles at the North Gate

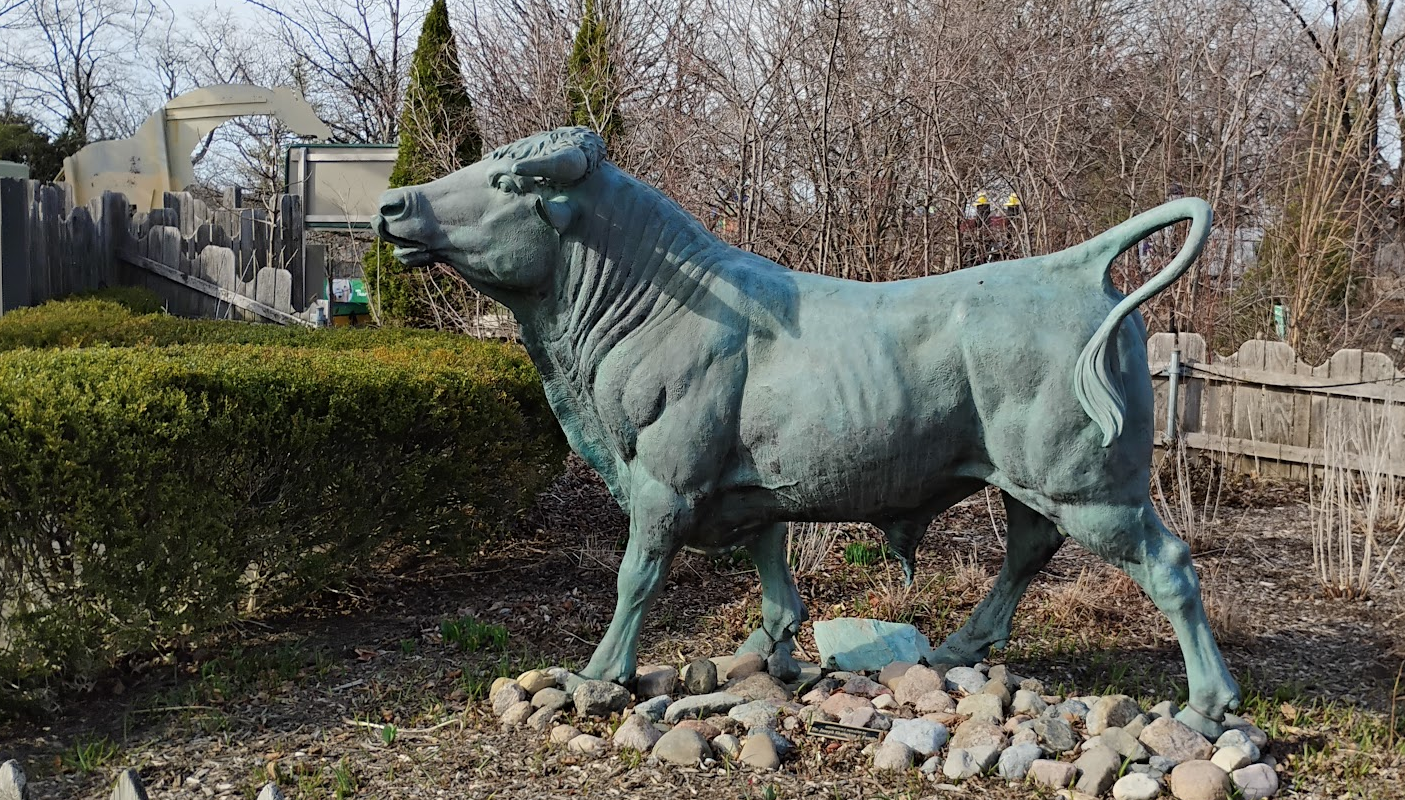
Bull statue near the North Gate at Brookfield Zoo Chicago

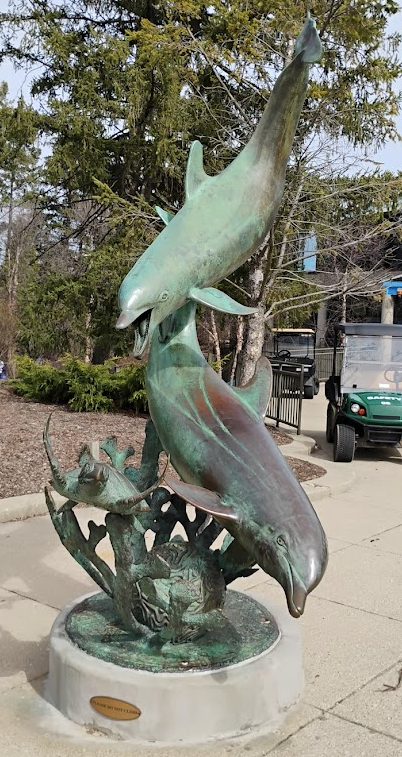
Dolphin statue in front of Seven Seas, Brookfield Zoo Chicago
