= Metriopelma =

Scientific classification
- Kingdom: Animalia
- Phylum: Arthropoda
- Subphylum: Chelicerata
- Class: Arachnida
- Order: Araneae
- Infraorder: Mygalomorphae
- Family: Theraphosidae
- Genus: Metriopelma; Becker, 1878
- Species: M. breyeri

Binomial name
- Metriopelma breyeri (Becker, 1878)

Genus of spiders

Metriopelma is a monotypic genus of Mexican tarantulas currently containing the single species, Metriopelma breyeri. It was first described by Léon Becker (1826–1909) in 1878, and originally found by Eugenio Dugès (1834–1895). This tarantula was named after Albert Breyer (1812–1876), a fellow entomologist. It is native to Mexico in the state of Guanajuato.

== Description ==
Its cephalothorax is brown, a little longer than it is round, with a comparatively narrow forehead. Its sternum is slightly cut on the sides, longer than it is wide, covered with hairs. The chelicerae are reddish, shiny, covered with thick hairs. The abdomen is oval, longer than the cephalothorax, dark brown and hairy. It has sturdy legs, covered with hair, with two small tarsal claws that are reddish and retractile.

== Transferred to other genera ==
This genus previously included:

- Metriopelma coloratum (now moved to genus Hapalopus)
- Metriopelma velox (now moved to genus Cymbiapophysa)
- Metriopelma familiare (moved to genus Cyclosternum)
- Metriopelma zebratum (moved to genus Davus and is now called Davus ruficeps)
- Metriopelma drymusetes (moved to genus Davus and is now called Davus fasciatus)
- Metriopelma variegatus (moved to genus Hapalopus)
- Metriopelma spinulosum (now moved to genus Acentropelma)
- Metriopelma ledezmae (now moved to genus Cyclosternum)
- Metriopelma nigriventris (now moved to genus Hapalopus).
