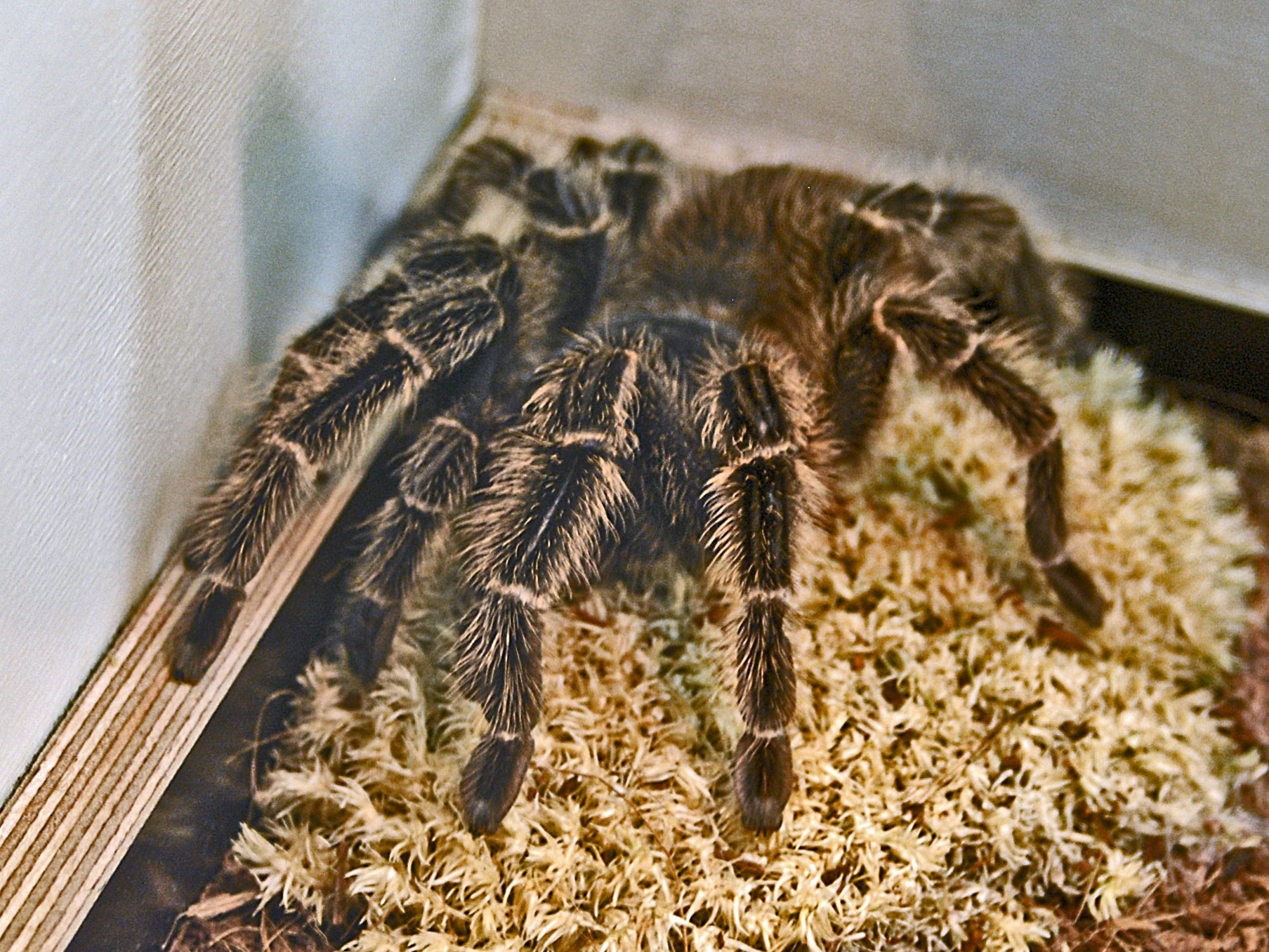
- Lasiodora difficilis

Scientific classification
- Kingdom: Animalia
- Phylum: Arthropoda
- Subphylum: Chelicerata
- Class: Arachnida
- Order: Araneae
- Infraorder: Mygalomorphae
- Family: Theraphosidae
- Genus: Lasiodora; C. L. Koch, 1850

Type species
- L. klugi (C. L. Koch, 1841)

Species
- 7, see text

= Lasiodora =

Genus of spiders

Lasiodora is a genus of tarantulas that was first described by Ludwig Carl Christian Koch in 1850. They are often very large; body lengths of up to 25 centimetres (9.8 in), including the legs, are not unusual.

== Diagnosis ==
This genus can be distinguished from other tarantulas by the presence of hairs used for stridulation on the upper area of the coxae of leg 1 and 2. Males also own a triangular keel below the apex of the palpal bulb, females also have a sclerotized (hardened by sclerotin) area between the two sections of the spermathecae.

== Species ==
As of December 2023 it contains seven species, found in Brazil:

- Lasiodora benedeni Bertkau, 1880 – Brazil
- Lasiodora camurujipe Bertani, 2023 – Brazil
- Lasiodora franciscana Bertani, 2023 – Brazil
- Lasiodora klugi (C. L. Koch, 1841) (type) – Brazil
- Lasiodora parahybana Mello-Leitão, 1917 – Brazil
- Lasiodora sertaneja Bertani, 2023 – Brazil
- Lasiodora subcanens Mello-Leitão, 1921 – Brazil

=== Transferred to other genera ===
- Lasiodora auronitens (Keyserling, 1891) → Pycnothele auripila
- Lasiodora boliviana (Simon, 1892) → Acanthoscurria insubtilis
- Lasiodora brevibulbus (Valerio, 1980) → Crypsidromus brevibulbus
- Lasiodora breyeri (Becker, 1878) → Metriopelma breyeri
- Lasiodora carinata (Valerio, 1980) → Crypsidromus carinatus
- Lasiodora colorata (Valerio, 1982) → Hapalopus coloratus
- Lasiodora drymusetes (Valerio, 1982) → Davus fasciatus
- Lasiodora familiaris (Simon, 1889) → Cyclosternum familiare
- Lasiodora gutzkei (Reichling, 1997) → Acentropelma gutzkei
- Lasiodora icecu (Valerio, 1980) → Crypsidromus icecu
- Lasiodora isabellina (Ausserer, 1871) → Crypsidromus isabellinus
- Lasiodora lakoi Mello-Leitão, 1943 → Megaphobema lakoi
- Lasiodora panamana Petrunkevitch, 1925 → Neischnocolus panamanus
- Lasiodora parvior Chamberlin & Ivie, 1936 → Neischnocolus panamanus
- Lasiodora porteri Mello-Leitão, 1936 → Grammostola rosea
- Lasiodora tetricus (Simon, 1889) → Miaschistopus tetricus
- Lasiodora trinitatis (Pocock, 1903) → Spinosatibiapalpus trinitatis
- Lasiodora trinitatis pauciaculeis (Strand, 1916) → Spinosatibiapalpus trinitatis pauciaculeis
- Lasiodora velox (Pocock, 1903) → Cymbiapophysa velox
- Lasiodora weijenberghi Thorell, 1894 →Eupalaestrus weijenberghi
- Lasiodora zebrata (Banks, 1909) → Davus ruficeps
