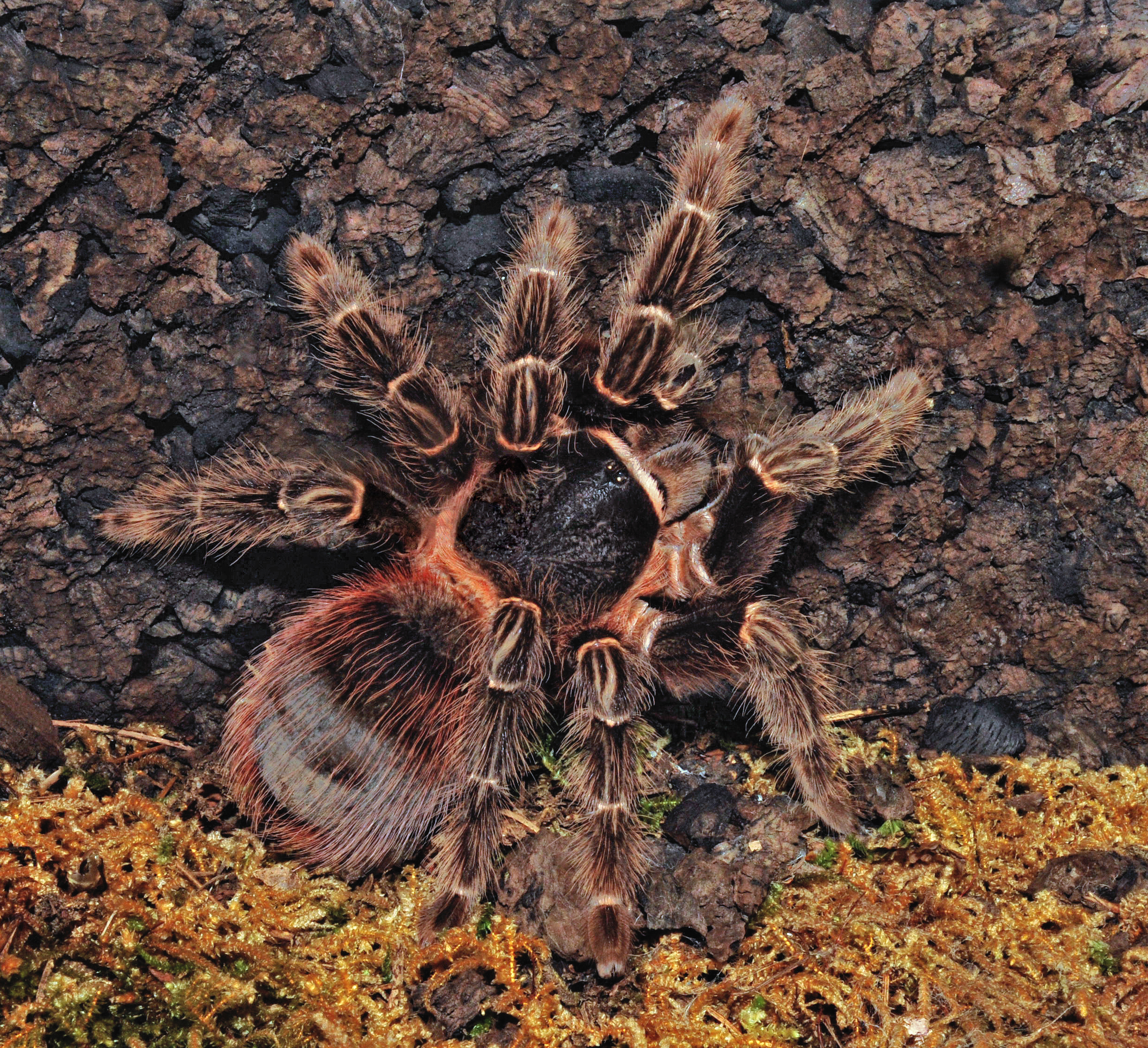

Scientific classification
- Kingdom: Animalia
- Phylum: Arthropoda
- Subphylum: Chelicerata
- Class: Arachnida
- Order: Araneae
- Infraorder: Mygalomorphae
- Family: Theraphosidae
- Genus: Lasiodora
- Species: L. klugi

Binomial name
- Lasiodora klugi (C.L. Koch, 1841)

= Lasiodora klugi =

Species of spider

The Lasiodora klugi (also known as the Bahia scarlet) is a tarantula endemic to Brazil. Its common name refers to the state of Bahia.

The species grows from 8 to 10 inches in size and looks similar to Lasiodora parahybana. L. klugi however has darker red hairs on its abdomen and has a heavier and thicker build than L. parahybana. L. klugi is more on the defensive and aggressive side whereas L. parahybana is a bit more skittish and tolerant. Like L. parahybana, L. klugi is an active and fast growing tarantula species that preys on a variety of insects and reptiles.
