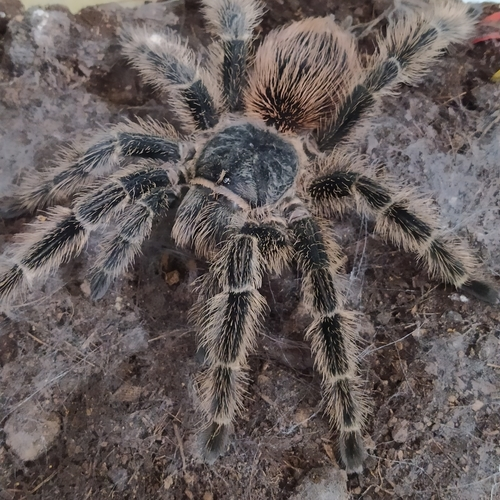

Scientific classification
- Kingdom: Animalia
- Phylum: Arthropoda
- Subphylum: Chelicerata
- Class: Arachnida
- Order: Araneae
- Infraorder: Mygalomorphae
- Family: Theraphosidae
- Genus: Lasiodora
- Species: L. subcanens

Binomial name
- Lasiodora subcanens (Mello-Leitão, 1921)

= Lasiodora subcanens =

Species of spider

Lasiodora subcanens is a tarantula endemic to Brazil. The name "subcanens" refers to the greyish hairs through the tarantula's body.
