= Cyclosternum palomeranum =

Scientific classification
- Kingdom: Animalia
- Phylum: Arthropoda
- Subphylum: Chelicerata
- Class: Arachnida
- Order: Araneae
- Infraorder: Mygalomorphae
- Family: Theraphosidae
- Genus: Cyclosternum
- Species: C. palomeranum

Binomial name
- Cyclosternum palomeranum Rick C. West, 2000

Species of spider

Cyclosternum palomeranum is a tarantula in the genus Cyclosternum, first described by Rick C. West in 2020. This tarantula is found in Mexico in the state of Jalisco, and is named after Mr. N M Palomera.

== Description ==
This tarantula is unique between others, because of its size, as it is one of the smallest Mexican tarantulas, measuring about 17mm to 23mm. Chelicerae, patellae and trochanters are pale gold, carapace with a reflective copper color. And the rest of the body being a brown color. The male palpal bulb is bent with a tampering to a point.
