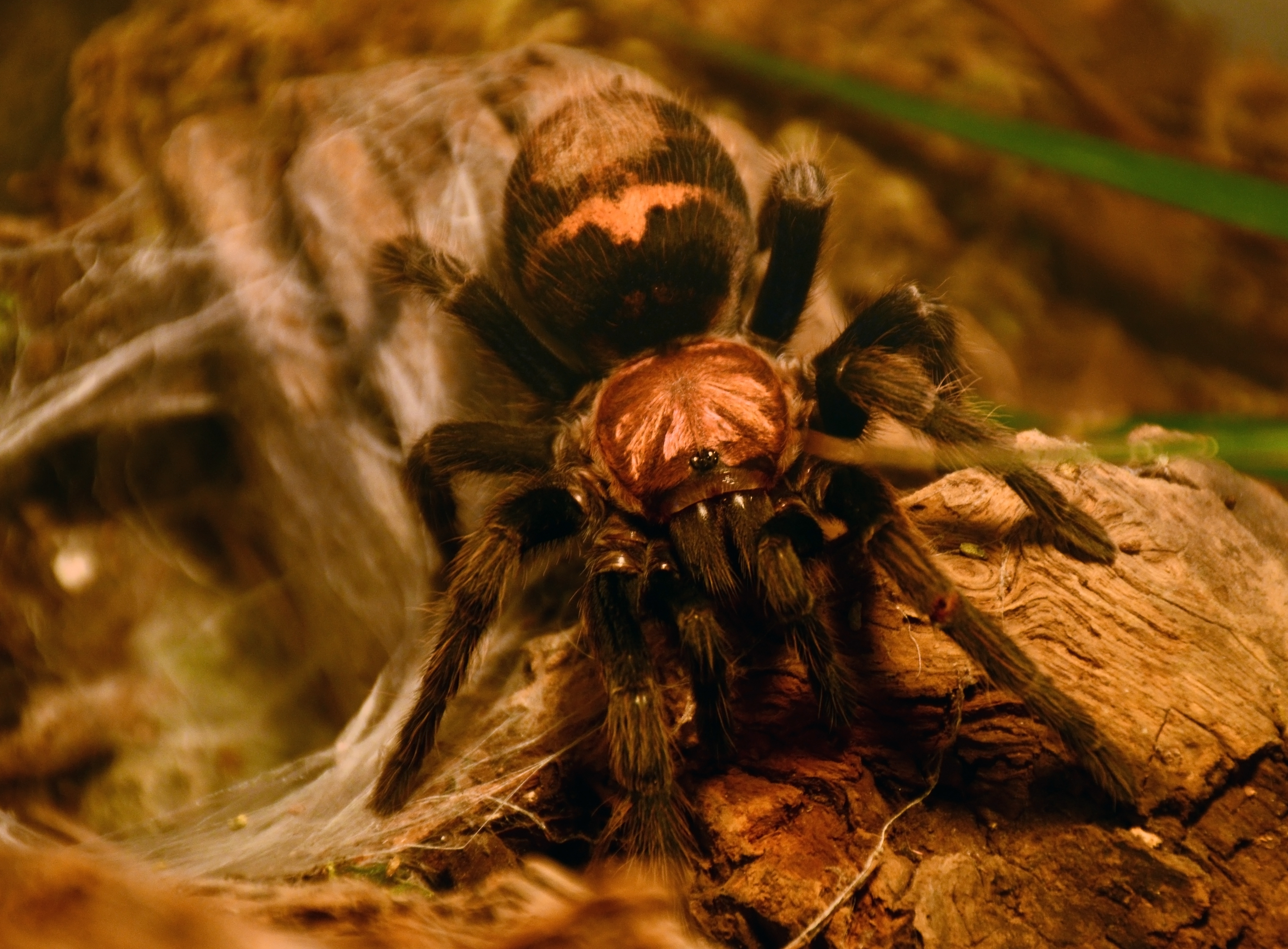
- Davus pentaloris

Scientific classification
- Kingdom: Animalia
- Phylum: Arthropoda
- Subphylum: Chelicerata
- Class: Arachnida
- Order: Araneae
- Infraorder: Mygalomorphae
- Family: Theraphosidae
- Genus: Davus; O. Pickard-Cambridge, 1892

Type species
- Davus fasciatus O. Pickard-Cambridge, 1892

Species
- 4, see text

= Davus =

Genus of spiders

Davus, also known as the tiger rump tarantulas, is a genus of spiders in the family Theraphosidae (tarantulas). It was formerly included in Cyclosternum. They are medium to large tarantulas, found in Central America and Mexico.

== Diagnosis ==
They are characterized by the opisthosomal pattern which are made of several red-orange stripes. Though further identification between species is decided mainly on the palpal bulb and spermatheca morphology. As Davus pentaloris owns a high variations of size, patterning and morphology.

== Species ==
As of October 2021, the World Spider Catalog accepted the following species:

- Davus fasciatus O. Pickard-Cambridge, 1892 (type species) – Costa Rica, Panama
- Davus pentaloris (Simon, 1888) – Mexico, Guatemala
- Davus ruficeps (Simon, 1891) – Mexico, Guatemala, El Salvador, Honduras
- Davus santos Gabriel, 2016 – Panama

=== In synonymy ===
- Davus drymusetes (Valerio, 1982) = Davus fasciatus
- Davus morosum (Banks, 1909) = Davus ruficeps
- Davus mozinno Estrada-Alvarez, 2014 = Davus pentaloris
- Davus zebratum (Banks, 1909) = Davus ruficeps
