= Cymbiapophysa marimbai =

Scientific classification
- Kingdom: Animalia
- Phylum: Arthropoda
- Subphylum: Chelicerata
- Class: Arachnida
- Order: Araneae
- Infraorder: Mygalomorphae
- Family: Theraphosidae
- Genus: Cymbiapophysa
- Species: C. marimbai

Binomial name
- Cymbiapophysa marimbai (Perafán & Valencia-Cuéllar, 2018)

Synonyms
- Proshapalopus marimbai Perafán & Valencia-Cuéllar, 2018

Species of spider

Cymbiapophysa marimbai is a tarantula in the genus Cymbiapophysa, first described in 2018. This tarantula is found in Colombia, in the Reserva Natural Biotopo Selva Humeda.

== Description ==
The cephalothorax and legs brown with black hairs, abdomen brown with reddish large hairs and a darker distal patch of urticating hairs. The carapace is covered by short black hairs and it has short reddish hairs pointing out. The legs are covered by long scattered hairs and short reddish hairs.
