= Grace Olive Wiley =

American herpetologist

- Wiley holding a rattlesnake and a gila monster
- Born: February 18, 1883; Chanute, Kansas, US
- Died: July 20, 1948 (aged 65); Long Beach, California, US
- Education: University of Kansas
- Known for: first person to successfully breed rattlesnakes in captivity
- Scientific career
- Fields: Herpetology
- Workplaces: Minneapolis Public Library, Brookfield Zoo

Grace Olive Wiley (February 18, 1883 – July 20, 1948) was an American herpetologist best known for her work with venomous snakes. She died of a snakebite she received while posing for a photographer at the age of 65.

== Background ==
Wiley originally worked as an entomologist at the University of Kansas, but during her mid-thirties she began collecting and observing rattlesnakes while doing field work in the Southwestern United States. Within a few years she became the first person to successfully breed rattlesnakes in captivity. In 1923, she was named a curator at the Minneapolis Public Library which had an extensive collection of live reptiles and amphibians in its now-defunct natural history museum.

== Mission, methods, and controversy ==
Wiley brought much attention while working in Minneapolis, even appearing in national publications like Time and Life. At the time, it was very unusual for a woman to be a curator of reptiles, and Wiley earned a reputation as a "woman without fear." Taking advantage of her fame, Wiley strove to change the public's negative perception of snakes, arguing, “The fear of snakes is cultivated. We are not born with it. Children love snakes as naturally as they love dogs and cats. Don’t be afraid of a reptile’s tongue. The only animal that can hurt you with its tongue is a human.”

Wiley argued that even venomous snakes were harmless if properly trained. She boasted that she had tamed over 300 venomous snakes in her lifetime, and she routinely handled rattlesnakes, cobras, copperheads, and mambas with her bare hands, eschewing any special instruments like hooks or snake tongs. She also left snakes' cages open for long periods of time and permitted venomous species to crawl throughout her workspace.

Though Wiley did not receive any serious snakebites during her time at the Minneapolis Library, her habits gradually brought her into conflict with many of her colleagues, who feared for Wiley's and their own safety. After a series of disputes, Wiley was finally pressured to leave the Minneapolis Library in 1933. Wiley quickly found new work as a curator of reptiles at the Brookfield Zoo, which opened in the western suburbs of Chicago in 1934, and she brought the library's collection of 236 reptiles and amphibians with her. Unfortunately, her casual snake-handling methods did not endear her to zoo staff members there, either, and after she had allowed 19 snakes to escape from their cages in 1935, she was fired by zoo director Robert Bean.

== California years ==
After parting ways with Brookfield Zoo, Wiley moved to California, where she became a snake trainer and reptile consultant for Hollywood films such as Moon Over Burma, The Jungle Book, and the Tarzan series. She also operated a reptile zoo in Cypress, California, where she charged 25 cents for visitors to see her large, personal collection.

On July 20, 1948, Wiley invited journalist Daniel P. Mannix to photograph her collection. While she was posing with a venomous Indian cobra the flash from the photographer's camera spooked the snake and it lunged. She restrained it, but was bitten, and she requested to be taken to a hospital. Unfortunately, her only vial of cobra antivenom (from the Haffkine Institute) was accidentally broken and the hospital had antivenom serums only for North American snakes. Wiley was pronounced dead less than two hours after being bitten. Although family and friends tried to preserve her collection, it was ultimately auctioned off, and the snake that killed Wiley was subsequently displayed at an Arizona roadside attraction.

Shortly before she died, Wiley's life story was adapted for a comic book (True Comics #58, 1947).

== Legacy ==
In 1948, she died in Long Beach, California. Wiley described Rheumatobates hungerfordi, a species of water strider, and is commemorated in the names of the Virgin Islands crested anole (Anolis cristatellus wileyae) and the insect Cenocorixa wileyae, a water boatman. In 2006, the city of Long Beach opened Grace Park, named after Wiley.

== Publications ==
- Life History Notes on Two Species of Saldidae (Hemiptera) Found in Kansas. The Kansas University Science Bulletin. October 1922. Vol XIV. No 9. pp 301–311.
- A new species of Rheumatobates from Texas (Heteroptera, Gerridae). The Canadian Entomologist. September 1923. Vol 55. No 9. pp 202–205.
- Surprising new facts about snakes learned by making pets of Rattlers The Milwaukee Sentinel September 22, 1929
