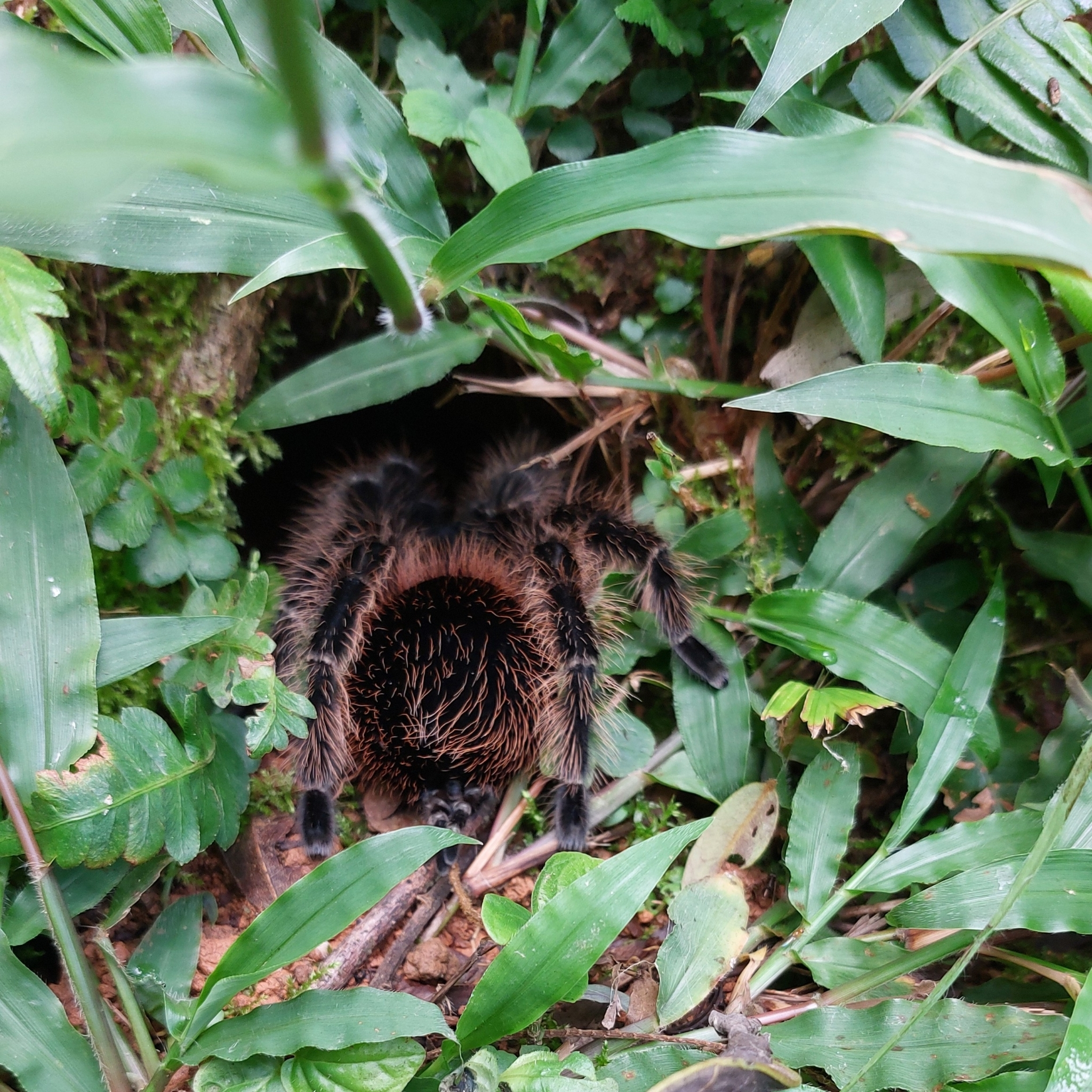

Scientific classification
- Kingdom: Animalia
- Phylum: Arthropoda
- Subphylum: Chelicerata
- Class: Arachnida
- Order: Araneae
- Infraorder: Mygalomorphae
- Family: Theraphosidae
- Genus: Lasiodora
- Species: L. franciscana

Binomial name
- Lasiodora franciscana Bertani, 2023

= Lasiodora franciscana =

Species of spider

Lasiodora franciscana is a species of tarantula endemic to Brazil. The name "franciscana" refers to the São Francisco River basin, where this species is found.
