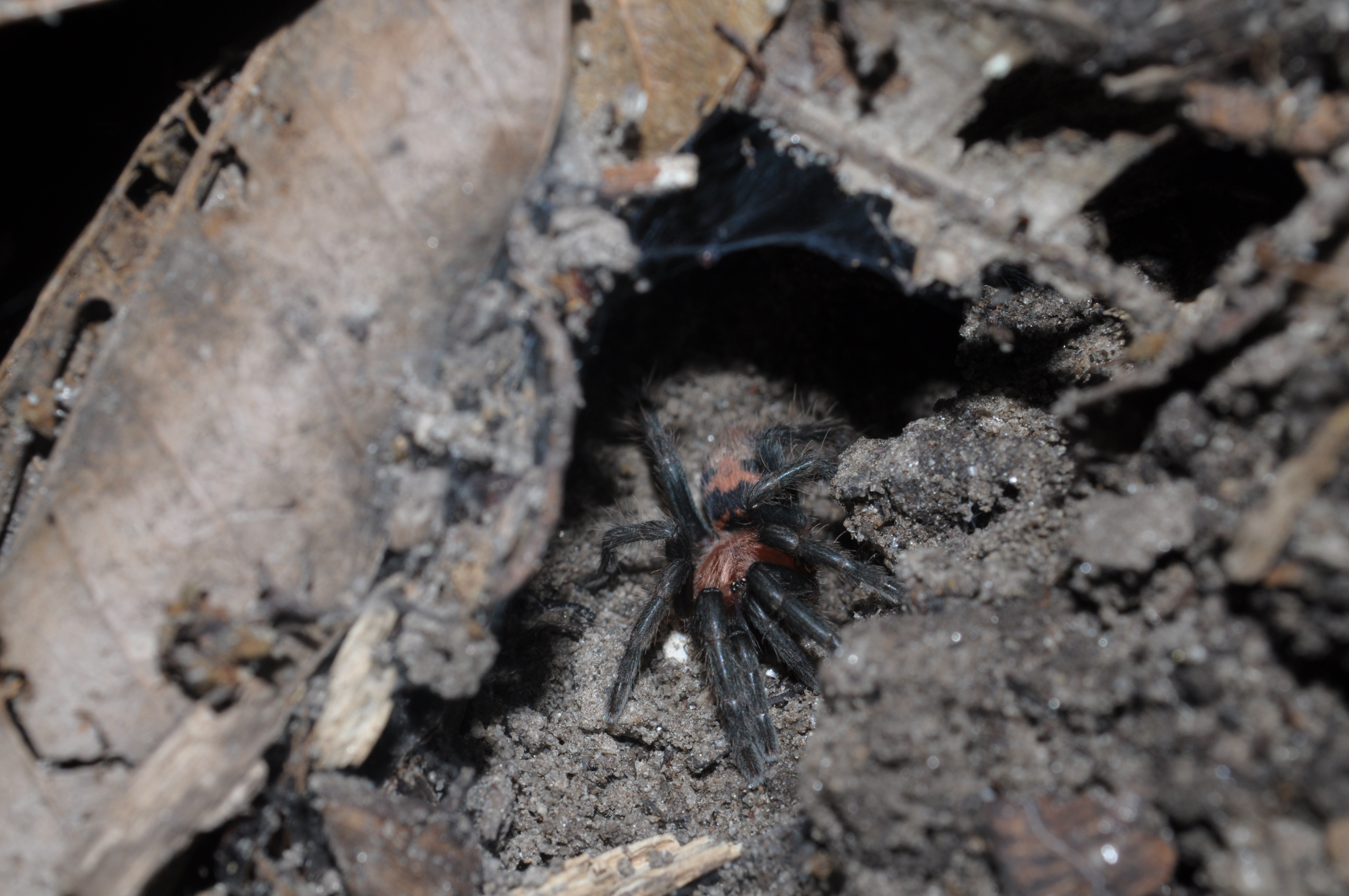

Scientific classification
- Kingdom: Animalia
- Phylum: Arthropoda
- Subphylum: Chelicerata
- Class: Arachnida
- Order: Araneae
- Infraorder: Mygalomorphae
- Family: Theraphosidae
- Genus: Davus
- Species: D. pentaloris

Binomial name
- Davus pentaloris (Simon, 1888)

= Davus pentaloris =

Species of spider

Davus pentaloris, commonly called the Guatemalan tiger rump, is a terrestrial species of New World tarantula (family Theraphosidae) native to El Salvador, Guatemala and Mexico. Davus was at one time considered to be a synonym of Cyclosternum, and its species were placed in that genus, but this is no longer accepted.

D. pentaloris has been found to display high morphological variation across its widespread distribution. Due to the typically low dispersal capability of tarantulas and associated high levels of local endemism this led to a hypothesis of hidden diversity within the species, with the high morphological variation suspected to be evidence that D. pentaloris is actually a species complex. Morphological and molecular analyses employing mtDNA data led to the recognition of 13 clearly diagnosable species, with 12 of them being new to science.

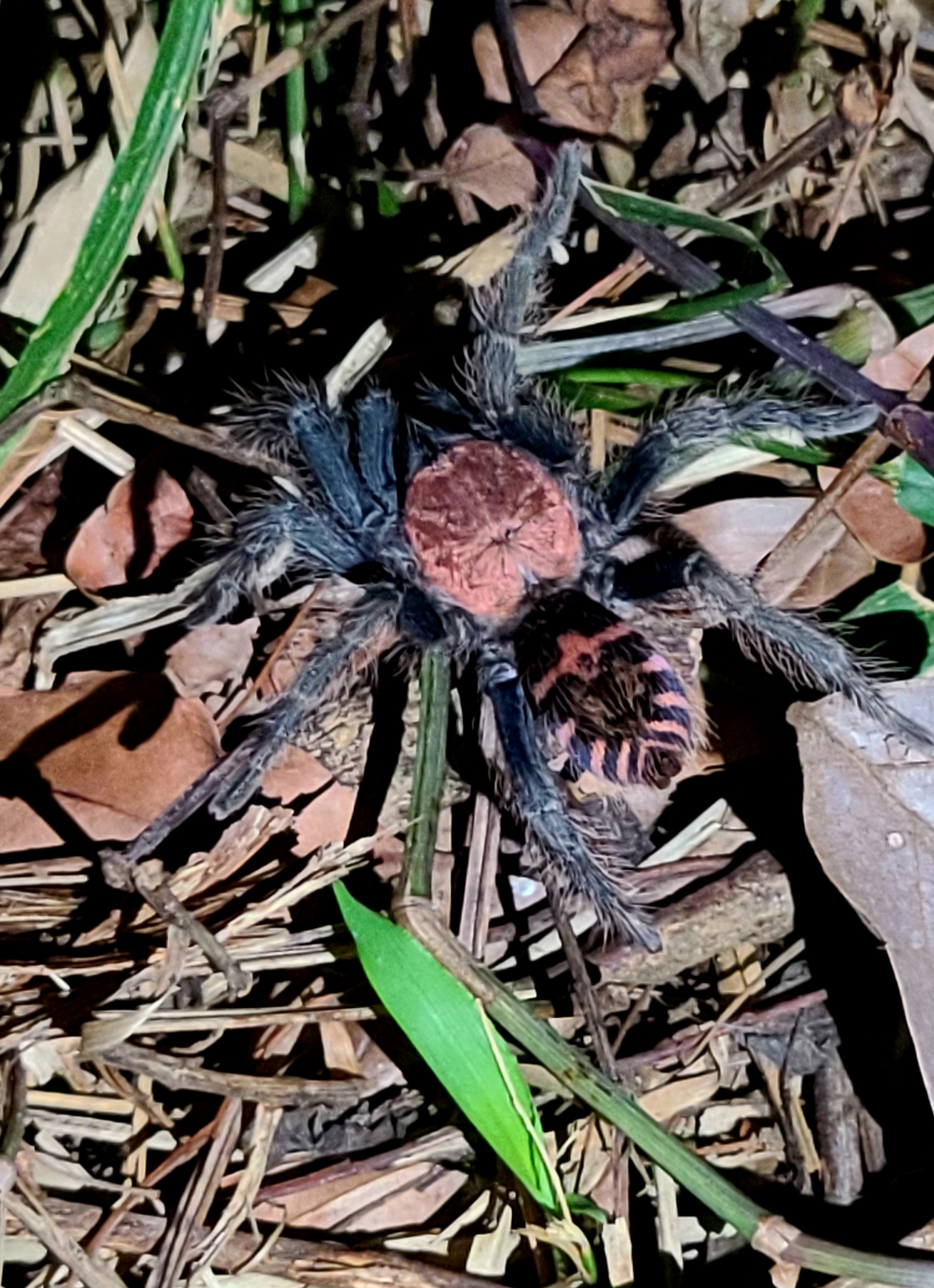
Tiger Rump Tarantula spotted in Jayaque, La Libertad (El Salvador)

== Description ==
D. pentaloris has a copper-colored carapace, with black legs and a black, copper-striped abdomen. The number and vibrancy of stripes varies, but it features a spot on its abdomen, towards the cephalothorax.

This species has urticating hairs on its abdomen, which it may kick into the air at perceived threats.

Its coloration can range from a coppery color, to a more orange hue. Morphological variations which separate some candidate species, that are naked to the eye, include: dark marks on the carapace, and pale leg marking/coloration.

== In captivity ==
D. pentaloris is kept and bred as a pet, but is frequently mislabelled and sold as D. fasciatus. Its lifespan in captivity is understood to be 2-4 years for males, and 8-10 years for females.

It is known to be skittish but docile, and easy to keep in the trade.

Following the 2021 paper detailing the morphological diversity and 13 diagnosable species within D. pentaloris, various vendors have begun to sell and breed specimens under open nomenclature, such as Davus sp. "Oaxaca" (or "Oaxaca white tiger") for light-legged specimens, as is common in the trade for species which have yet to be formally described.
