= Acentropelma =

Scientific classification
- Kingdom: Animalia
- Phylum: Arthropoda
- Subphylum: Chelicerata
- Class: Arachnida
- Order: Araneae
- Infraorder: Mygalomorphae
- Family: Theraphosidae
- Genus: Acentropelma; Pocock

Type species
- Acentropelma spinulosum

Species
- Acentropelma gutzkei (Reichling, 1997) - Belize; Acentropelma spinulosum (F. O. Pickard-Cambridge, 1897); Guatemala

Genus of spiders

Acentropelma is a genus of spiders in the family Theraphosidae. It was first described in 1901 by Pocock. As of 2020, it contains 2 species.

== Description ==
Genus Acentropelma resembles genus Metriopelma, with the distinction of Scopula on the first leg and palp.

== List of Species ==
The following is a list of known species within the genus Acentropelma:

- Acentropelma gutzkei (Reichling, 1997) - Colombia
- Acentropelma spinulosum (F. O. Pickard-Cambridge, 1897) (type) - Guatemala

== Etymology ==
The term Acentropelma comes from the Greek combining form "a-" meaning "not, without, or opposite to", the Latin, "Centro-", meaning "Center"., and the Greek "-Pelma" meaning "the underside or sole of the foot".
