= Cymbiapophysa =

Scientific classification
- Kingdom: Animalia
- Phylum: Arthropoda
- Subphylum: Chelicerata
- Class: Arachnida
- Order: Araneae
- Infraorder: Mygalomorphae
- Family: Theraphosidae
- Genus: Cymbiapophysa; Gabriel & Sherwood, 2020

Diversity
- 12 species

Cymbiapophysa is a genus of spiders in the family Theraphosidae, first described by R. Gabriel & Danniella Sherwood, in 2020. As of 2024 it contains 12 species. The tarantulas of this genus inhabit Central America. Males of this genus can be distinguished by the presence of a distal retrolateral apophysis on the cymbium of the male pedipalp. And females can be distinguished with twin spermathecae, by the morphology and the short and squat receptacles.

== Distribution ==
This tarantula is found throughout Central America, in Ecuador, Colombia and Peru, this tarantulas are found near the shores facing the Pacific Ocean. Their habitat is partly in the Choco Darien Moist Forest and partially the Western Ecuador Moist Forests.

== Species ==
As of March 2024 there are 12 named species in the genus:

- C. ashily Penaherrera-R et al., 2024 – Ecuador
- C. carmencita Penaherrera-R, 2023 – Ecuador
- C. falconi Penaherrera-R, 2023 – Ecuador
- C. homero Penaherrera-R, 2023 – Ecuador
- C. magna Sherwood et al., 2021 – Colombia
- C. matildeae Penaherrera-R et al., 2024 – Ecuador
- C. marimbai Perafán & Valencia-Cuéllar, 2018 – Colombia
- C. otongachi Penaherrera-R et al., 2024 – Ecuador
- C. seldeni Gabriel & Sherwood, 2023 – Equador
- C. velox Pocock, 1903 – Ecuador
- C. yimana Gabriel & Sherwood, 2020 – Peru and Ecuador
- C. yumbos Penaherrera-R et al., 2024 – Ecuador
