= Desert hairy scorpion =

Desert hairy scorpion can refer to the following scorpion species in the genus Hadrurus:

- Giant desert hairy scorpion (H. arizonensis)
- Northern desert hairy scorpion (H. spadix)
