= Chinese lantern =

Chinese lantern may refer to:

- A collapsible paper lantern or sky lantern in bright colours, primarily red but also other colours, used for decorative purposes, commonly painted with Chinese art and calligraphy motifs and used throughout East, South and Southeast Asia
- Shrubs in the genus Abutilon:
  - Abutilon × hybridum
  - Abutilon pictum
- The shrub or small tree Dichrostachys cinerea
- The herbaceous plant in the monotypic genus Alkekengi
- The plant Quincula lobata
- The Chinese lantern structure, a molecule containing two metal centers bridged by four bidentate ligands
- The Schwarz lantern, a geometric construction serving as an example in defining area of surface.
