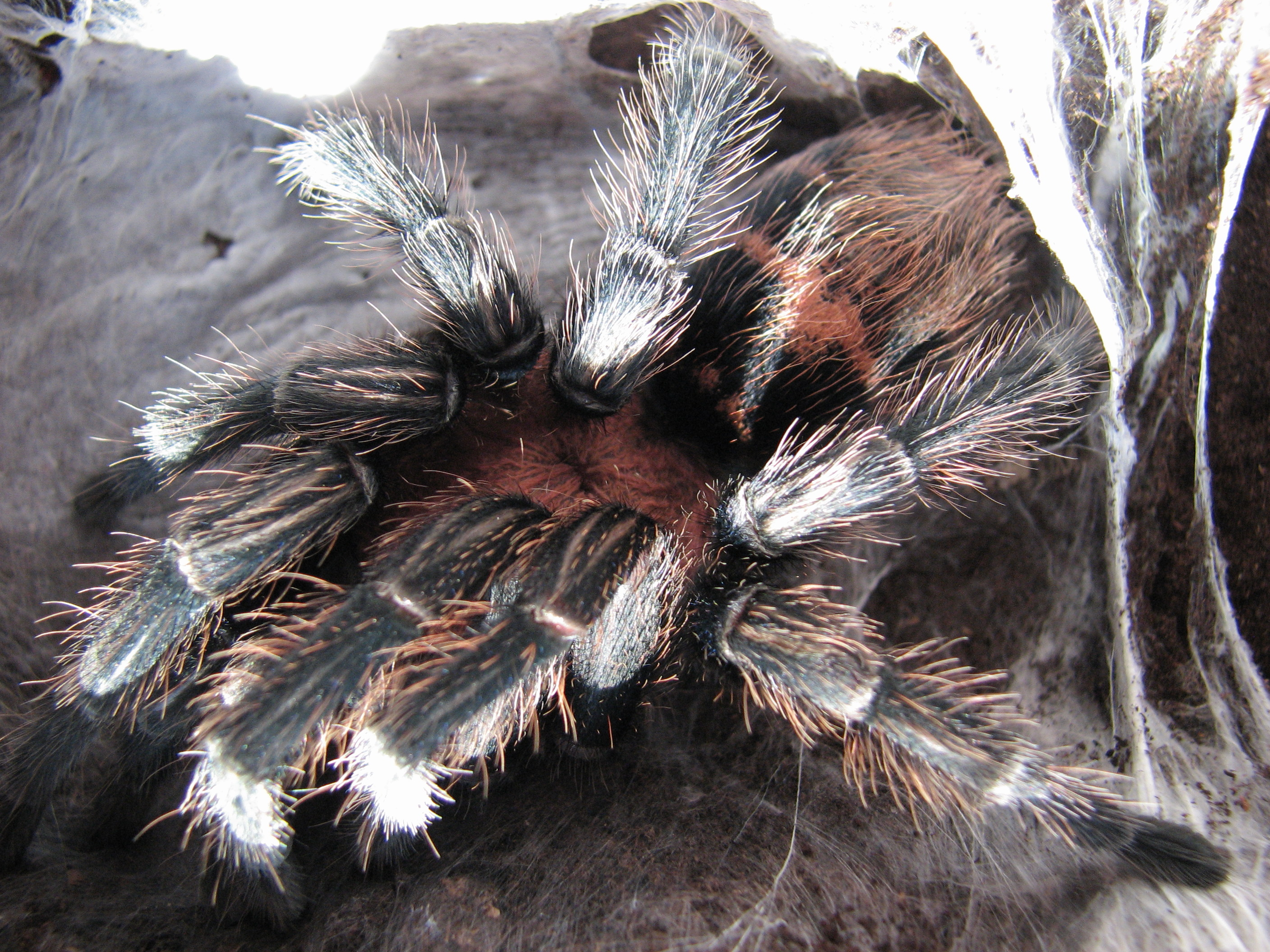
- Cyclosternum fasciatum, adult female

Scientific classification
- Kingdom: Animalia
- Phylum: Arthropoda
- Subphylum: Chelicerata
- Class: Arachnida
- Order: Araneae
- Infraorder: Mygalomorphae
- Family: Theraphosidae
- Genus: Cyclosternum; Ausserer, 1871

Type species
- C. schmardae Ausserer, 1871

Species
- 12, see text

Synonyms
- Adranochelia Simon, 1889; Chaetorhombus Ausserer, 1871; Dryptopelma Simon, 1889

= Cyclosternum =

Genus of spiders

Cyclosternum is a genus of tarantulas that was first described by Anton Ausserer in 1871.

== Species ==
As of July 2022 it contains twelve species, found in South America, Costa Rica, and Mexico:

- Cyclosternum darienense Gabriel & Sherwood, 2022 – Panama
- Cyclosternum familiare (Simon, 1889) – Venezuela
- Cyclosternum garbei (Mello-Leitão, 1923) – Brazil
- Cyclosternum gaujoni Simon, 1889 – Ecuador
- Cyclosternum janthinum (Simon, 1889) – Ecuador
- Cyclosternum kochi (Ausserer, 1871) – Venezuela
- Cyclosternum ledezmae (Vol, 2001) – Bolivia
- Cyclosternum palomeranum West, 2000 – Mexico
- Cyclosternum rufohirtum (Simon, 1889) – Venezuela
- Cyclosternum schmardae Ausserer, 1871 (type) – Colombia, Ecuador
- Cyclosternum spinopalpus (Schaefer, 1996) – Paraguay
- Cyclosternum viridimonte Valerio, 1982 – Costa Rica

=== Nomen dubium ===
- Cyclosternum pulcherrimaklaasi (Schmidt, 1991) - Ecuador

=== Transferred to other genera ===
- C. bicolor (Schiapelli & Gerschman, 1945) → Cyriocosmus bicolor
- C. chickeringi (Caporiacco, 1955) → Tmesiphantes chickeringi (Nomina dubia)
- C. crassifemur (Gerschman & Schiapelli, 1960) → Tmesiphantes crassifemur
- C. fasciatum (O. Pickard-Cambridge, 1892) → Davus fasciatus
- C. hirsutum (Mello-Leitão, 1935) → Homoeomma hirsutum
- C. ischnoculiforme Franganillo, 1926 → Cyrtopholis ischnoculiformis
- C. janeirum (Keyserling, 1891) → Tmesiphantes janeira
- C. longipes (Schiapelli & Gerschman, 1945) → Holothele longipes
- C. macropus (Ausserer, 1875) → Pseudoschizopelma macropus
- C. majus Franganillo, 1926 → Cyrtopholis major
- C. melloleitaoi Bücherl, Timotheo & Lucas, 1971 → Vitalius nondescriptus
- C. minensis (Mello-Leitão, 1943) → Plesiopelma minense
- C. multicuspidatum (Mello-Leitão, 1929) → Proshapalopus multicuspidatus
- C. nubilum (Simon, 1892) → Tmesiphantes nubilus
- C. obesum (Simon, 1892) → Bonnetina obscura (Nomina dubia)
- C. obscurum Simon, 1891 → Bonnetina obscura
- C. pentalore (Simon, 1888) → Davus pentaloris
- C. physopus (Mello-Leitão, 1926) → Plesiopelma physopus
- C. rondoni (Lucas & Bücherl, 1972) → Holothele longipes
- C. semiaurantiacum Simon, 1897 → Plesiopelma semiaurantiacum
- C. serratum (Gerschman & Schiapelli, 1958) → Homoeomma uruguayense
- C. stylipum Valerio, 1982 → Stichoplastoris stylipus
- C. symmetricum (Bücherl, 1949) → Plesiopelma insulare
