= Blue tang =

Blue tang is the common name of several species of surgeonfish.

These include:

- Acanthurus coeruleus, a surgeonfish usually found in the Caribbean and the tropical Atlantic Ocean
- Acanthurus leucosternon, a surgeonfish usually found in the tropical Indian Ocean
- Paracanthurus hepatus, a surgeonfish usually found in the tropical Pacific Ocean

== See also ==
- Blue eyed tang
