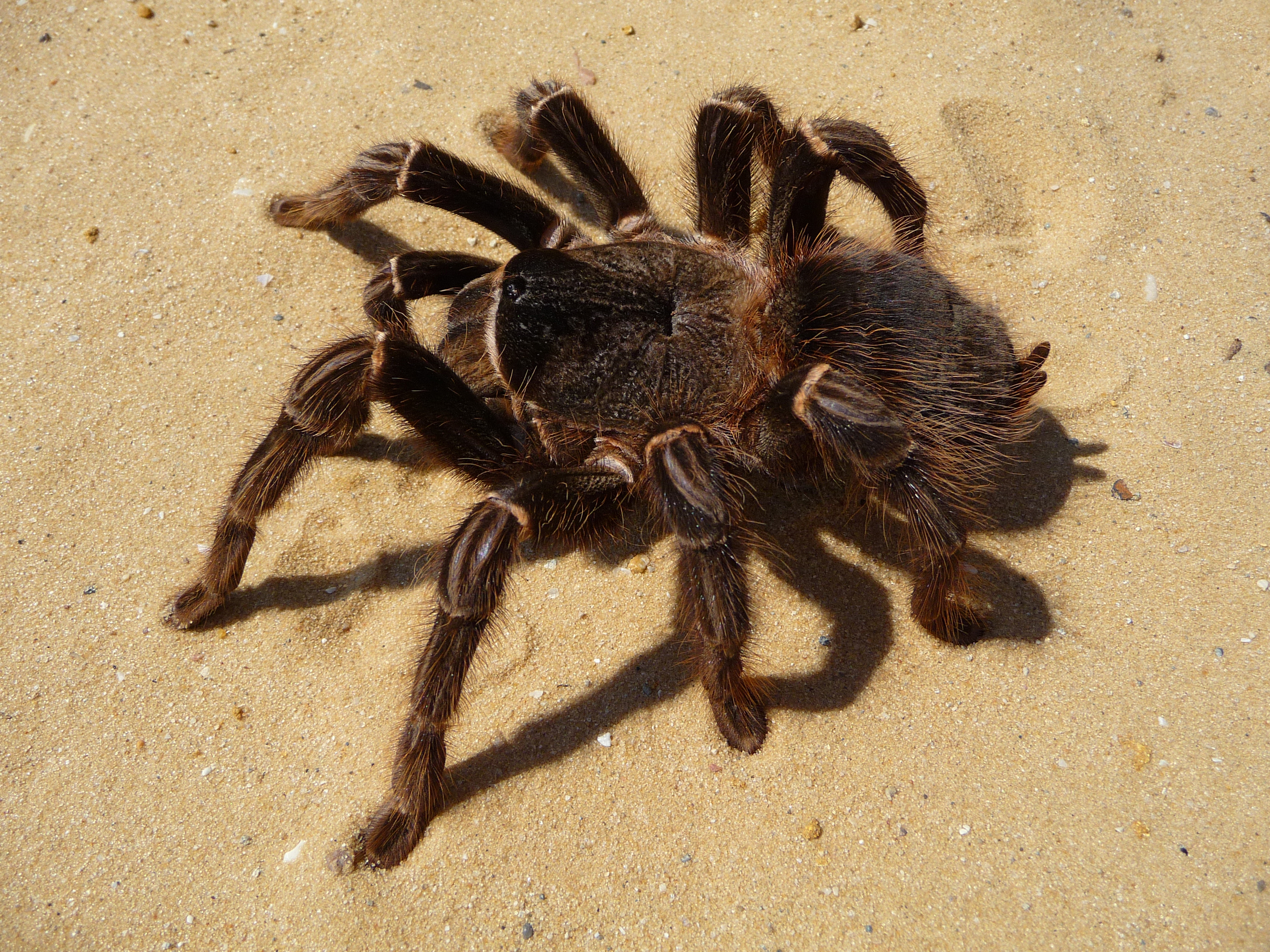

Scientific classification
- Kingdom: Animalia
- Phylum: Arthropoda
- Subphylum: Chelicerata
- Class: Arachnida
- Order: Araneae
- Infraorder: Mygalomorphae
- Family: Theraphosidae
- Genus: Lasiodora
- Species: L. parahybana

Binomial name
- Lasiodora parahybana Mello-Leitão, 1917

= Lasiodora parahybana =

Brazilian salmon pink bird-eating tarantula

Species of spider

Lasiodora parahybana, the Brazilian salmon pink bird-eating tarantula, also simply known as the salmon pink or LP, is a tarantula from north-eastern Brazil and considered to be the fourth largest tarantula in the world (behind the three species in the genus Theraphosa).

It was discovered and described in 1917 by Cândido Firmino de Mello-Leitão, in Paraíba, where the tarantula is endemic. They are popular pets in the tarantula hobby due to their large size and readiness to breed. They are also considered to be 'docile'.

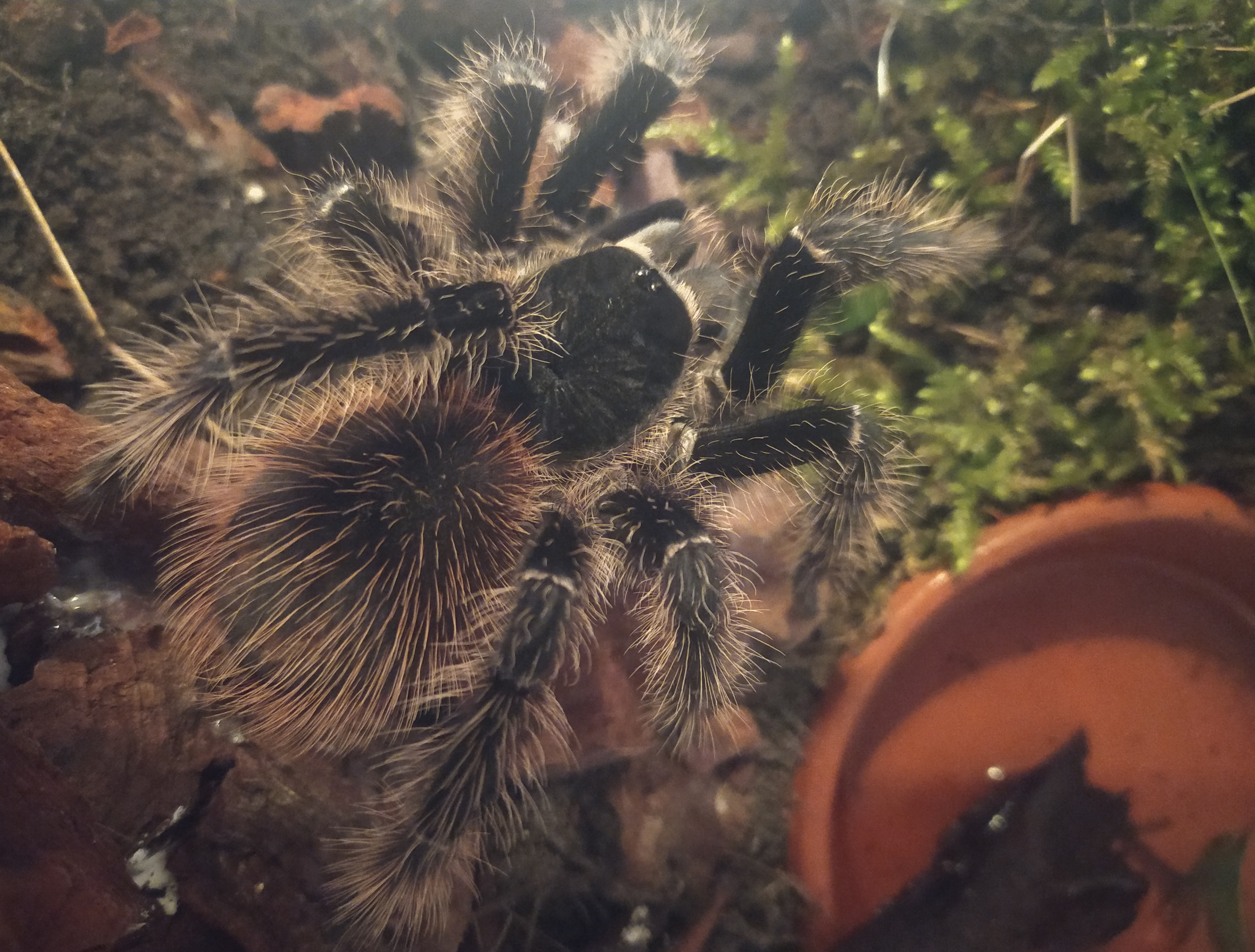
A male Lasiodora parahybana kept in captivity

== Description ==
The salmon pink bird-eater can attain a leg size of up to 11 inches (28 cm), especially in males as their legs are longer than the female’s. However, females can weigh more than 100 grams (3.5 oz). Females are often bulky: they have a large body size in comparison to their legs, whereas males tend to be slender in body size. Mature males will also have tibial hooks on the front pair of legs; these hook back a female’s fangs during mating.

They are widely considered by pet traders to be an aesthetically pleasing tarantula species; they are a uniform black colour, and once mature, have pink-red hairs along the legs, chelicerae and abdomen, with colours tending to be more vibrant in males.

L. parahybana are endemic to Brazil in the Atlantic forest region of the country; they are known from one area near Campina Grande.

== Behaviour ==
When threatened, the tarantula will raise its legs in the air, as well as the front of its body, in order to deter predators. If the attacker continues to attack, the tarantula will bite. The Brazilian salmon pink tarantula is capable of delivering a painful bite. They are known to bite only when provoked, and even then, this is a last resort. Bites from L. parahybana are mechanically dangerous but not medically significant since their fangs, which can be up to an inch long, are capable of penetrating human skin but the venom is weak to humans. Some sites claim that a bite from a salmon pink is similar to that of a cat. However, rather than biting, they choose to flick urticating hairs from a patch on their abdomen; these hairs are covered in barbs which irritate the skin and put off potential predators. The urticating hairs from this species can cause mild to severe irritation on human skin and is likened to the urticating hairs of the Grammostola genus, but not as intense as the Goliath Birdeaters found in genus Theraphosa.

In the wild, the tarantulas inhabit the forest floor, where they stay in hiding places such as leaf litter, inside logs, or in burrows, or out in the open. They are ambush predators, lying in wait, striking prey as it comes close, and quickly injecting venom to subdue it. They do not spin webs. In the wild, a salmon pink will feed mainly on large insects and, occasionally, amphibians and small reptiles. Although they are called bird-eating spiders, there is very little evidence to suggest they actually catch and eat birds.

Due to their exoskeleton and method of growth, salmon pinks, like many invertebrates, regularly moult out of their old skin (ecdysis). Like most tarantulas, they will lie on their back and force themselves out of their old skin. During this time, they are at risk of predation. A tarantula will stop eating a few days before this process.

== Breeding ==
During the breeding season, males will deposit sperm from their abdomen onto a webbed mat, also known as a sperm web. They will then "soak" up the sperm with their pedipalps and find a female. When a female is located, the two trade signals in order to establish species, and to discover if the female is receptive. The male will push a female back with his front two legs, using the tibial hooks to push the fangs back in order to prevent being over-powered and eaten by the female. He then inserts his pedipalp into the epigastric furrow on the female’s abdomen and empties his pedipalp. He repeats this with the other pedipalp.

Once mating is over, the male will unhook his front legs from the female and run. Females have a tendency to give chase for a short while; males who are too slow are at risk of being eaten in order to sustain the future embryos.

== In captivity ==
Brazilian salmon pink tarantulas are very popular in captivity for a number of reasons. Their appearance, both in size and color, makes them desirable. Their willingness to sit out in the open also makes them popular. They are also a more beginner friendly and cheaper option than a T. blondi; L. parahybana reproduces in such large numbers that the price of spiderlings is much lower.

L. parahybana is also praised in the tarantula trade for their ease of handling compared to other tarantula species due to their more docile nature, and urticating setae being less potent than that of the Goliath Birdeater. However, the merits of handling them is still debated, especially taking into account the size and power of their fangs. Like most new world tarantulas, their urticating hair still causes discomfort of varying severity when in contact with human skin, eyes, throat, or nose. Handling can also be dangerous to the tarantula—with terrestrial species such as L. parahybana, because they are so heavily bodied, a fall of more than a few inches can rupture the abdomen and severely injure or kill the tarantula.
