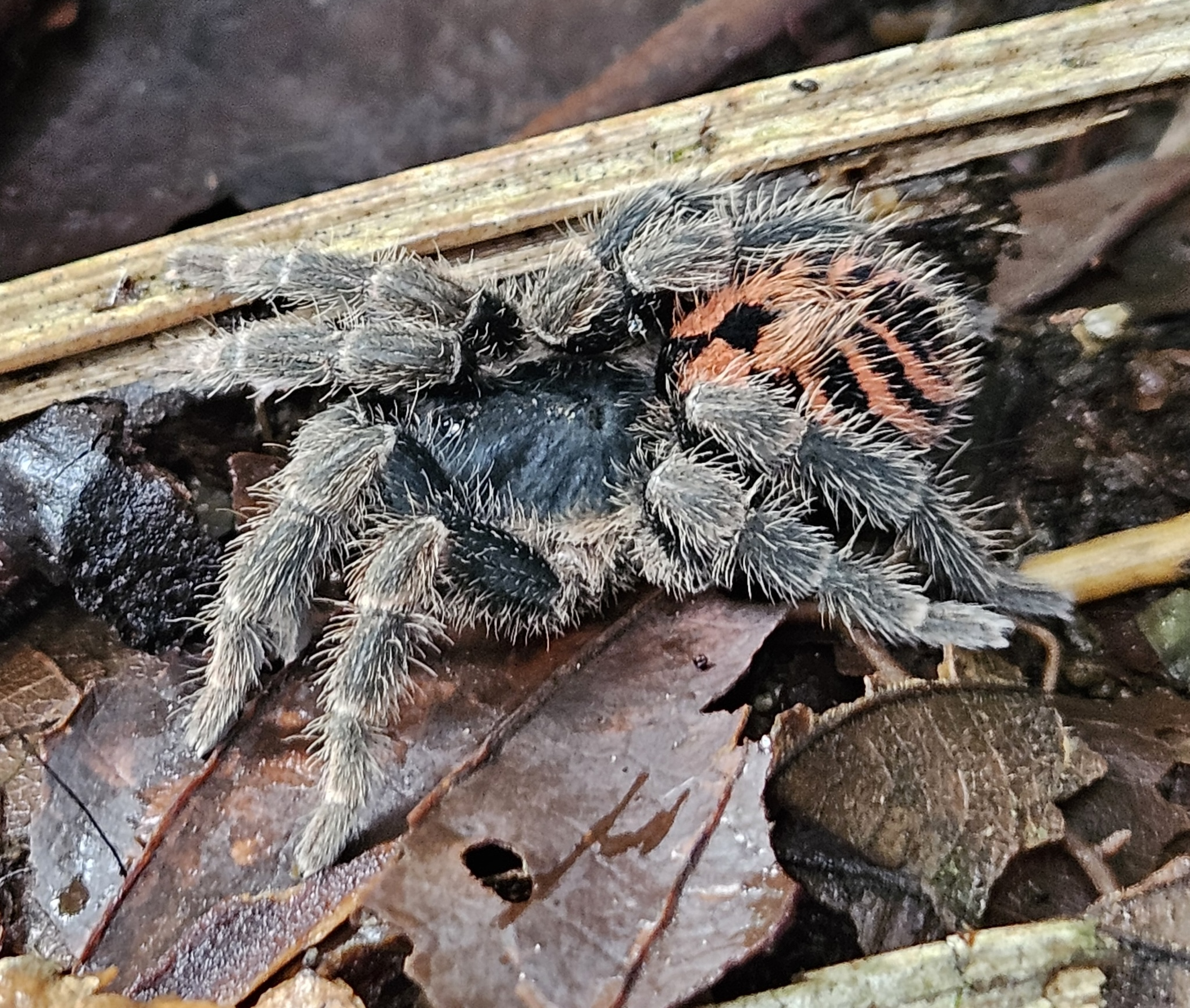
- Juvenile

Scientific classification
- Kingdom: Animalia
- Phylum: Arthropoda
- Subphylum: Chelicerata
- Class: Arachnida
- Order: Araneae
- Infraorder: Mygalomorphae
- Family: Theraphosidae
- Genus: Davus
- Species: D. fasciatus

Binomial name
- Davus fasciatus O. Pickard-Cambridge, 1892

Synonyms
- Cyclosternum fasciatus Valerio, 1982

= Davus fasciatus =

Species of spider

Davus fasciatus, commonly known as the Costa Rican tiger rump, is a species of a new-world tarantula endemic to Costa Rica.

This species is a common misnomer of Davus pentaloris, due to mislabelling in the pet trade. Davus fasciatus does not currently exist in the pet trade.

== Description ==
The Costa Rican Tiger Rump is a relatively small, terrestrial species of tarantula. It has a black carapace, legs and abdomen. As its name indicates, its abdomen has distinct orange-red stripes and "saddle" markings, which vary across individuals. The orange markings often form a spade — or arrowlike — pattern down the center.

This species can be differentiated from others in its genus by its black carapace.

== Behaviour ==
Like most tarantulas, this species eats various arthropods, which it kills via envenomation. This species is not known to pose a threat to humans.

== Reproduction ==
Females possess spermathecaes and mature males possess tibial hooks on the front pair of legs. Males use their tibial hooks to position the female in order to inseminate her using his emboli, organs on the pedipalps of mature males. The female creates an egg sac out of her silk, which she lays many eggs inside of.

== Gallery ==
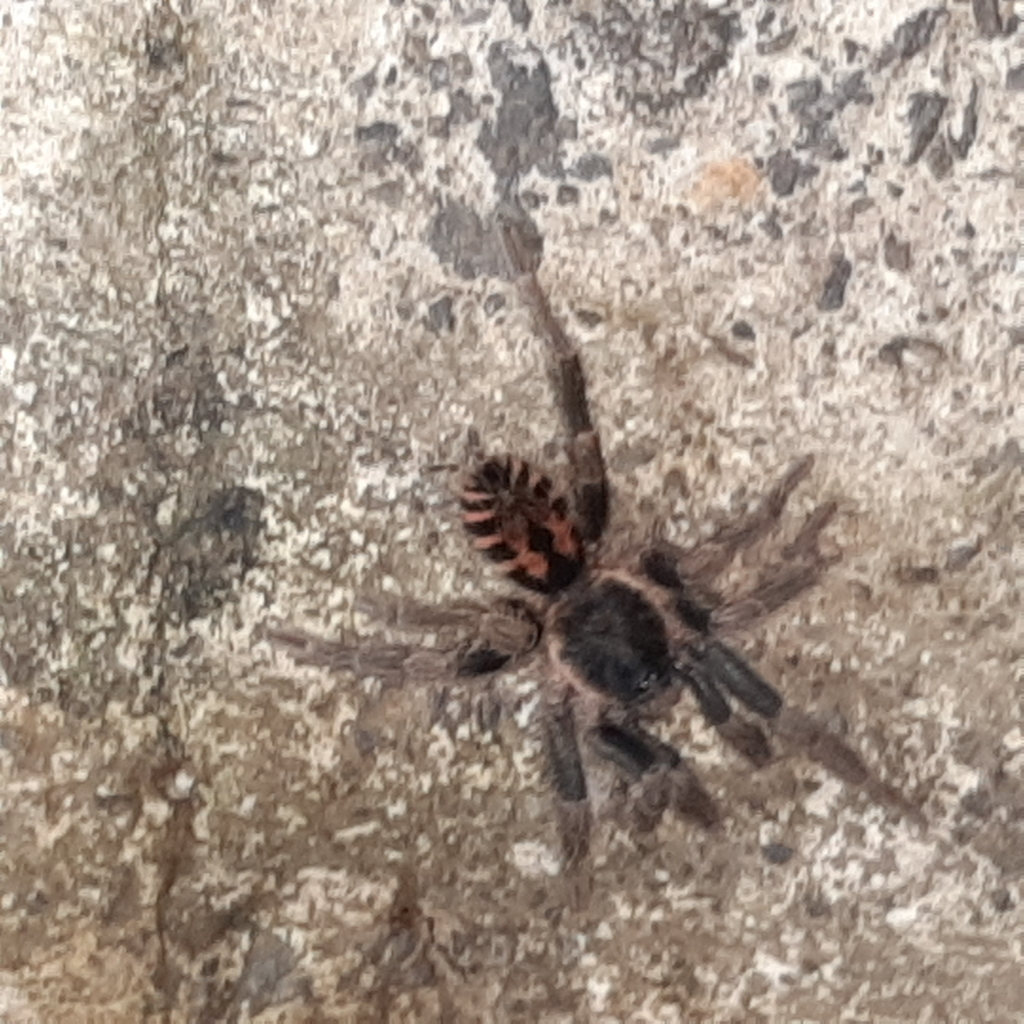

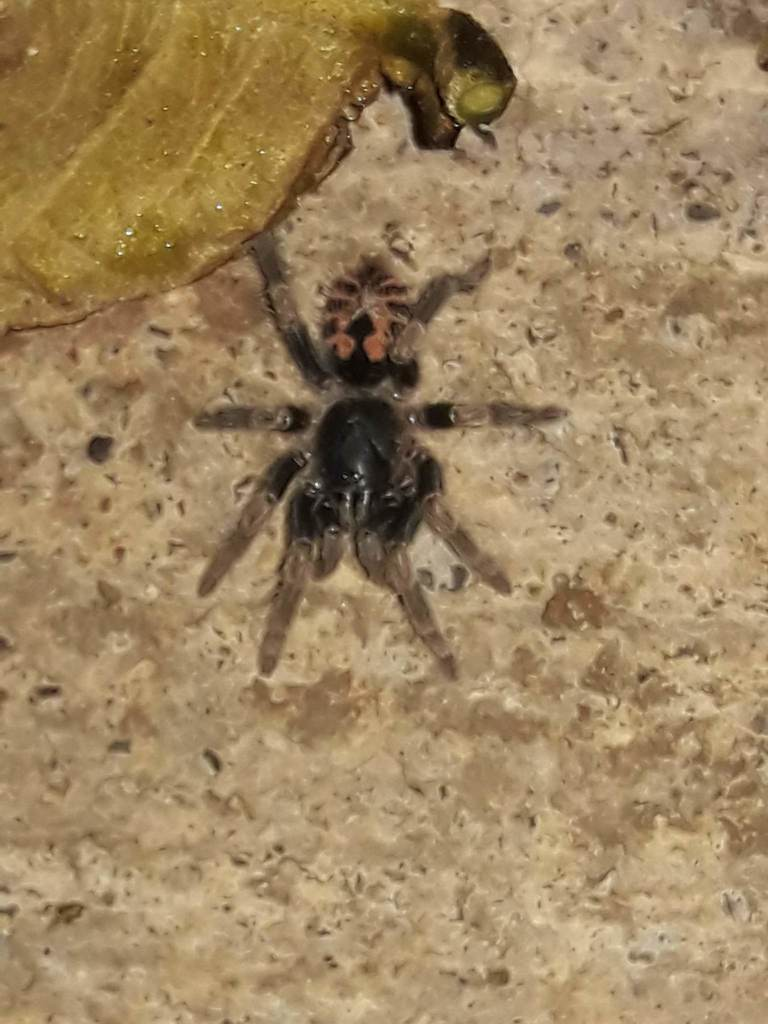

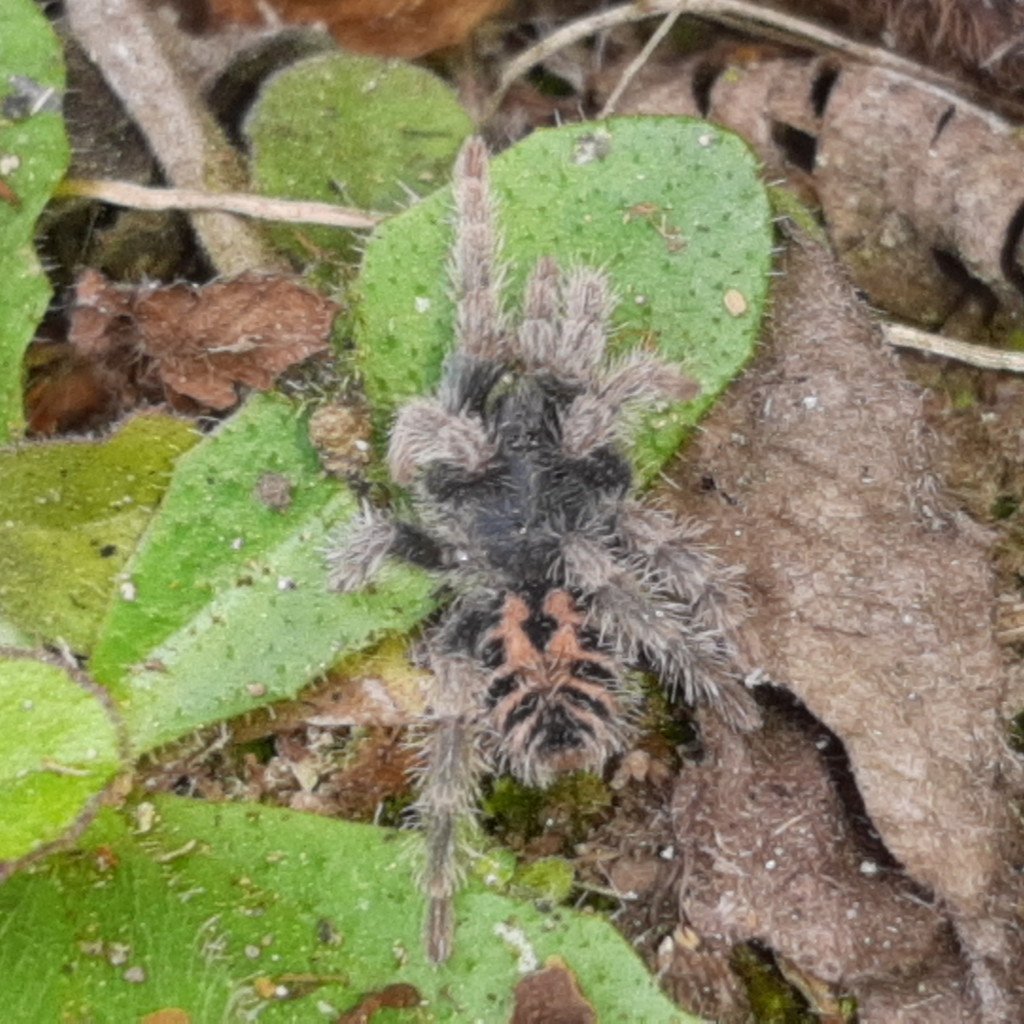
