= Zoró =

Total population
- 787 (2020)

Regions with significant populations
- Mato Grosso, Rondônia (Brazil)

Languages
- Gavião of Jiparaná (Zoró language)

Religion
- Christianity

Related ethnic groups
- Arara and Gavião

The Zoró (autonym: Pangyjej) are an Indigenous people native to the states of Mato Grosso and Rondônia, Brazil. Their population was around 787 in 2020.

== Etymology ==
The name Zoró originates from the word monshoro (dry head), which is a derogatory term in the Surui language, whose speakers were neighboring enemies of the Zoró. The word monshoro was shortened to shoro and then, over time, to zoró.

== Language ==
The Zoró speak the Zoró language, which Ethnologue considers a dialect of the Gavião of Jiparaná language, a Tupian language of the Monde branch. However, their dialect is sometimes considered a separate language because it is mutually unintelligible with the other dialects of the Gavião of Jiparaná language.

== Economy ==
Traditionally, the economy of the Zoró was based on hunting, horticulture, fishing, and gathering. In the 1980s, they sold handicrafts or worked in rubber extraction. In the 1990s, the main economy of the Zoró became the timber trade. With the income from this activity, they started buying cattle and vehicles, opening roads, and building houses in the villages. Currently, some villages have agreements with regional ranchers, where they authorize cattle grazing on their lands and, in exchange, the rancher makes annual payments with calves and provides training for Zoró cowboys. There is also a partnership with FUNAI through the Artindia or Programa de Artesanato Indígena da FUNAI (FUNAI Indigenous Handicraft Program), where Zoró women can earn an income from regular handicraft sales. Additionally, there is the collection and trade of Brazil nuts, which involves almost all Zoró villages through the PIC or Programa Integrado da Castanha (Integrated Brazil nut program). The Zoró Indigenous People's Association has partnered with Coopavam or Cooperativa dos Agricultores do Vale do Amanhecer (Cooperative of Farmers from the Vale do Amanhecer), which is responsible for the logistics and distribution of the nuts.
