= Guariba Arára language =

Language of Brazil

Guariba Arára
- Arara do Rio Guariba
- Native to: Brazil
- Region: Aripuanã Indigenous Park
- Language family: Tupian: Monde; (unclassified); Guariba Arára

Language codes
- ISO 639-3: None (mis)
- Glottolog: None gavi1246 Gavião Do Jiparaná

Guariba Arára (Arara do Rio Guariba, or Arara of Guariba River) is a poorly attested Tupian language of the Monde branch. It is spoken on the Guariba River in the northern part of Aripuanã Indigenous Park of Rondônia and Mato Grosso, Brazil.

According to Moore (2005), Arara do Rio Guariba is closely related to the Cinta Larga dialect cluster, and also shares some features with Suruí. 26 words were collected by Inês Hargreaves in 2001.

== Vocabulary ==
Below are the Arara do Rio Guariba words that Inês Hargreaves had elicited from D. Nazaré Medina Arara on June 12, 2001:

Portuguese gloss (original)	English gloss (translated)	Arara do Rio Guariba
água	water	itxera / ĩtʃera
peixe (pacu)	pacu	mborip kabɛ
anta	tapir	waøa / wasa
mutum	curassow	wakuia / wakuya
arara	macaw	awala / awalap
cujubim	red-throated piping guan	tuap / twap
macaco-barrigudo	woolly monkey	mbasai kot
coatá	spider monkey	alimɛ’
jacamim	trumpeter	tamalia / tamaliap
caititu	collared peccary	mbɛbɛcot / mbebecot
queixada	white-lipped peccary	mbɛbɛ
criança homem	boy	oi
criança mulher	girl	kuña
onça	jaguar	mbeku
gato (maracajá)	margay	mbeku
banana	banana	mbukuba / mukuba
aranha	spider	saipɛ
olho	eye	ña kap / oña kap
pé	foot	pipɛ
guariba	howler monkey	ʔalimɛ
cutia	agouti	wakĩn
veado	deer	itiap / tiap
filho	son	kuiã
jacu	guan	tanoap
água	water	itʃera
cinta larga	Cinta Larga people	’kurumĩn
