= Zagreb Zoo =

Zoo in Zagreb, Croatia

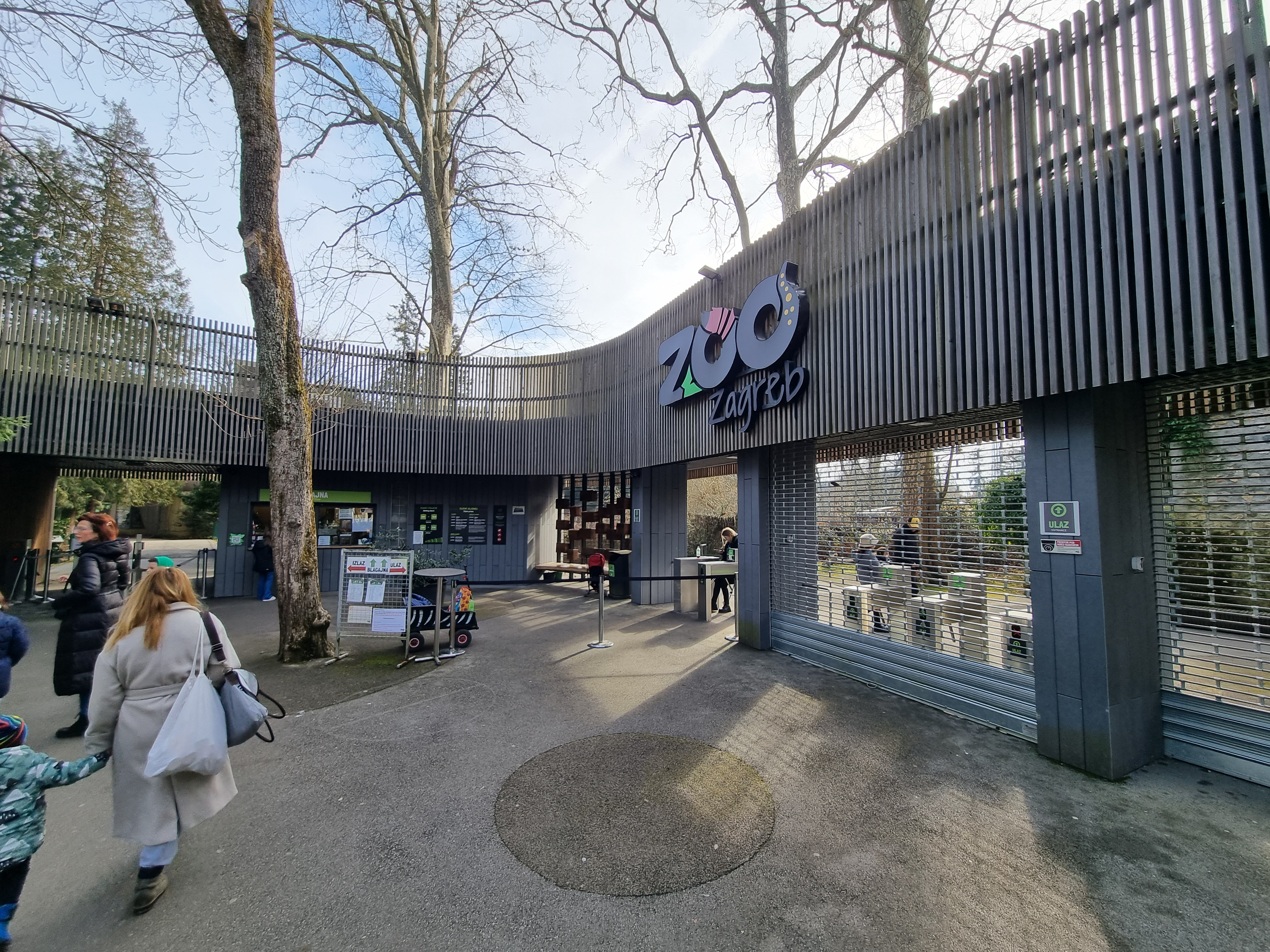
- Zagreb ZOO, Main Entrance
- Interactive map of Zagreb Zoo
- 45°49′22″N 16°1′19″E
- Date opened: 27 June 1925; 101 years ago
- Land area: 5.5 ha (14 acres); 7 ha (17 acres) including lakes and ponds
- No. of animals: 7,000
- No. of species: 383
- Annual visitors: 481,818 (2023)
- Memberships: EAZA, WAZA
- Major exhibits: Insectarium; Madagascar; Australia; Monkeys pavillon African village Twilight Zone; Snakes of Croatia; Tropical house
- Website: zoo.hr/en

Zagreb Zoo (Croatian: Zoološki vrt Grada Zagreba) is a 7-hectare (17-acre) zoo located within Maksimir Park in Zagreb, Croatia. It is one of three zoo parks in the country.

Zagreb Zoo is a member of both the European and the World Association of Zoos and Aquariums and is a participant in the European Endangered Species Programme.

== History ==
The zoo opened its doors on June 27, 1925, at the initiative of engineer Mijo Filipović, and with the support of the then mayor of Zagreb, architect Vjekoslav Heinzel. It was opened on the site of Swan Island, today's first island on the First Maksimir Lake. When it opened, the zoo had only five animals – three foxes and two tawny owls, and today, together with the lake, it covers an area of seven hectares. The Zoological Garden (the name remained until 1927) and today's zoo has grown to include 383 species of animals and over 7,000 individuals. When it began, it was the first in Southeast Europe, and today it is the largest zoo in Croatia.

In the summer of 1928, the zoo was temporarily moved to an address at Jelačić Square No. 15 to earn money for its support and repay a loan for the purchase of animals. The Zagreb Zoo is involved in several global organizations for the conservation of endangered species. Three key periods in the development were marked by the garden's landscaping undertaken in the 1930s and 1950s, and by a third phase that began in the 1990s and continues today. Each of these three periods was marked by some spatial, constructional and architectural arrangement of the garden, or the construction of modern dwellings. Reconstruction of the old zoo began in 1990. By October 2016, first part of the zoo reconstruction and modernization was finished.

=== Historical timeline ===
- 1905: The idea of establishing a zoo was promoted in Zagreb. The idea was promoted by the governor's advisor Dr. Ivo Malin, Prof. Dr. August Langhoffer and Dr. Ervin Rössler.
- 1925 : On June 27, the Zagreb Zoo was founded by Mijo Filipović, making it the oldest zoo in Southeast Europe. It is worth mentioning that on the day of its opening, there were only five animals there – three foxes and two owls. The foxes were donated by August Langhoffer, then director of the Zagreb Zoological Museum. The owls were donated by Petar Dimec, who brought them in a green hat. The entrance fee in the first days was one dinar.
- 1926 : The zoo expanded and moved from the island to the mainland.
- 1933 : The monthly magazine Zoološki Vrtić (Zoo kindergarten) began publication.
- 1972 : The Tropical House was built and one of the longest-lived residents moved in – a Nile crocodile.
- 1990 : A major renovation and modernization began. The animals were given larger, more beautiful, and more modern housing, and animals that could not be given adequate space were relocated to other zoos. The zoo also began organizing educational tours, entertainment, and events.
- 2014 : In May of that year, a new 1,800-square-meter lion enclosure was built. This was a major expansion, as the previous enclosure was only about two-hundred square meters. The enclosure has its own lion cave, savanna-like rocky islands, its own watering hole, and a heated rock in the middle on which lions can bask in the sun.
- 2017 : On June 4, the aviary for African birds was opened, allowing bird watching without any visible barriers. Thanks to modern architectural solutions, African waterfowl were given a huge vaulted space that allows them to stay on the ground, but also fly. Visitors could enter the habitat and see the birds as in nature, but only a meter or two away. Observation posts were also provided from which birds can be viewed with the help of binoculars and telescopes.
- 2019 : Duh monsunskih šuma (The Spirit of the Monsoon Forests) pavilion was renovated, and a king cobra moved in. A new home was also given to the Komodo dragon, which had been waiting since 2016. Eight new terrariums were renovated, housing ten new species that had not been visible to visitors.

=== Architecture ===
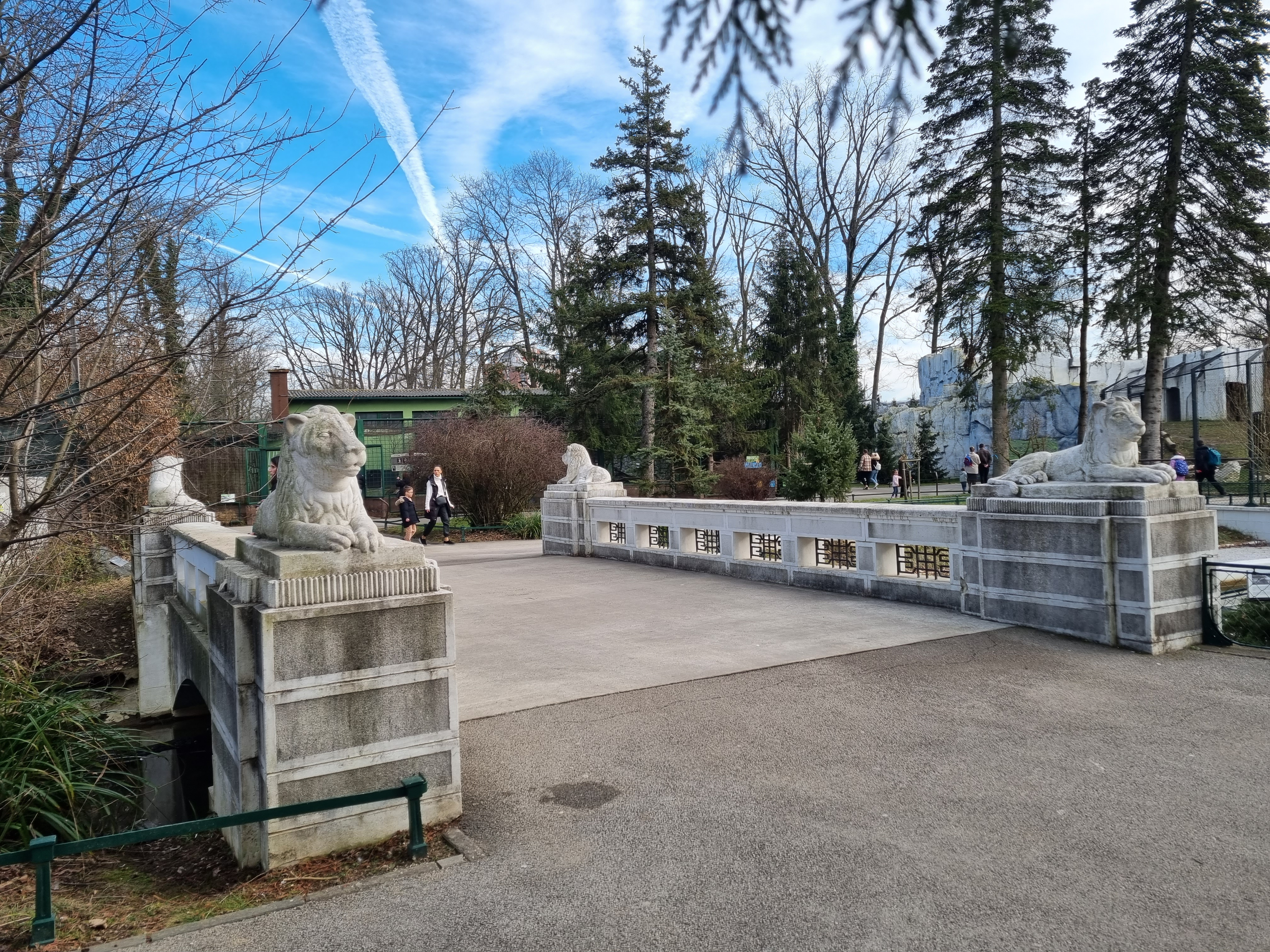
Lions Bridge

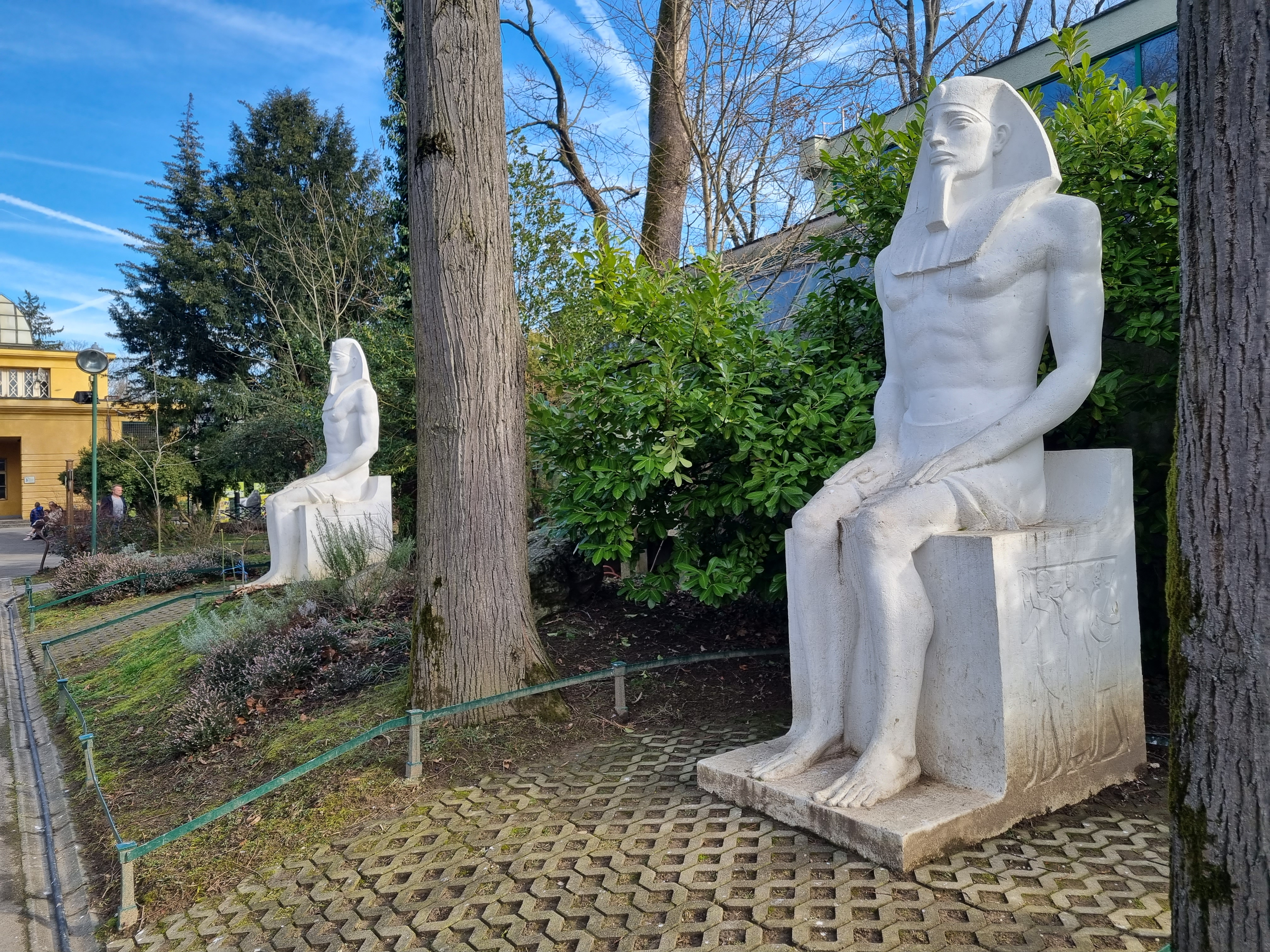
Egyptians statues

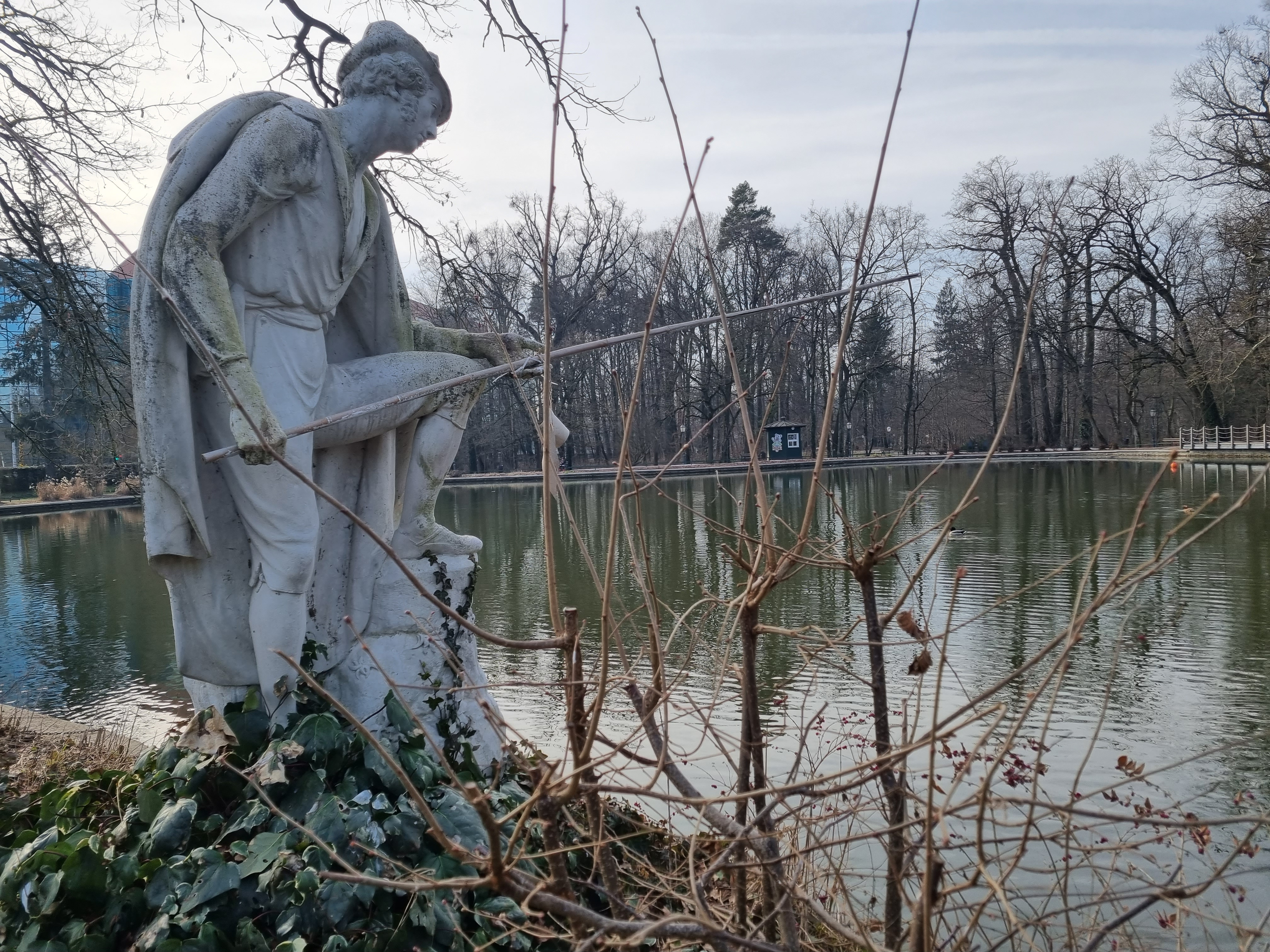
Neapolitan Fisherman statue

Throughout the history of the zoo, many structures have been built that are today cherished as historical and cultural heritage. One of the most famous is the Lions Bridge (Lavlji most) with four stone lions. At the very entrance stands, perhaps the oldest building in the zoo from 1926, the tower known as the Enchanted Palace. It used to be a dwelling for bears or wolves, but it soon became unacceptable for housing animals. Today, it offers an experience to all who visit it and is a glimpse into the zoo's past. Some of the other protected buildings that should definitely be highlighted are the magnificent Egyptians, statues about 5 meters tall, and the Neapolitan Fisherman who fishes along the shore of the lake.

== Animals ==
The zoo is home to over 7,000 animals representing 383 species.

=== Exhibits ===
==== Mammals ====
Some of the mammals include:

- Giant anteater
- Northern treeshrew
- Ring-tailed lemur
- Pygmy marmoset
- Tufted capuchin
- Black howler
- Lar gibbon
- Red squirrel
- African lion
- Amur leopard
- Eurasian wolf
- Pied tamarin
- Chimpanzee
- Kirk's dik-dik
- Black-and-white colobus
- Red panda
- Southern three-banded armadillo
- Meerkat
- Grant's zebra
- Pygmy hippopotamus
- Bactrian camel
- Hanuman langur
- Dinaric vole
- Dwarf mongoose
- Asian small-clawed otter
- California sea lion
- Swamp wallaby
- Scimitar-horned oryx
- European bison
- Patagonian mara
- Capybara
- Striped skunk
- South American coati
- South American tapir
- Northern white-breasted hedgehog
- Gray-handed night monkey
- Black-tailed prairie dog
- Alpaca
- House mouse
- Black-and-white ruffed lemur
- Golden-handed tamarin
- Domestic sheep
- African brush-tailed porcupine
- Azara's agouti
- Asian garden dormouse

==== Birds ====
Some of the birds include:

- Common crane
- Pied imperial pigeon
- Cuban grassquit
- Cape Barren goose
- European roller
- Grey parrot
- Ruddy shelduck
- Southern ground hornbill
- Hamerkop (Scopus umbretta)
- Eurasian griffon vulture
- White-bellied parrot
- Scarlet ibis
- Black swan
- Mute swan
- Great curassow
- African sacred ibis
- Orinoco goose
- Malagasy turtle dove
- Common ostrich
- Laysan duck
- Mandarin duck
- Red-shouldered macaw
- Temminck's tragopan
- Abdim's stork
- White stork
- Channel-billed toucan
- Black-crowned night heron
- African spoonbill
- Eurasian spoonbill
- Moluccan cockatoo
- White-faced whistling duck
- Sunda zebra finch
- Emu
- Dalmatian pelican
- Grey heron
- White-tailed eagle
- Eclectus parrot
- Red-and-green macaw
- Marabou stork
- Victoria crowned pigeon
- Red fody
- Burrowing owl
- Snowy owl
- Eurasian eagle owl
- Ural owl
- Grey crowned crane
- Madagascar partridge

==== Fishes ====
Some of the fishes include:

- African pike
- Azure damselfish
- Clown anemonefish
- Saddleback clownfish
- Electric eel
- Reedfish
- Silver arowana
- Prussian carp
- Ocellate river stingray
- Brown tang
- Valentin's sharpnose puffer

==== Amphibians ====
Some of the amphibians include:

- Rubber eel
- Dyeing poison dart frog
- Common Surinam toad
- Yellow-banded poison dart frog
- Vietnamese mossy frog
- Anthony's poison arrow frog
- Bornean eared frog
- Splashback poison frog
- Green and black poison dart frog
- Golfodulcean poison frog
- Olm
- Common toad
- Helmeted water toad
- Amazon milk frog
- Common tree frog
- Fire salamander
- Yellow-bellied toad
- Magnificent tree frog
- European green toad
- Lake Urmia newt
- Axolotl
- Italian crested newt
- Smooth newt
- Iberian ribbed newt

==== Reptiles ====
Some of the reptiles include:

- Amethystine python
- Fiji banded iguana
- Macklot's python
- Blue-spotted tree monitor
- Baron's green racer
- Large-scaled water monitor
- Green bush viper
- Kim Howell's dwarf gecko
- European pond turtle
- Aesculapian snake
- Grass snake
- Sheltopusik
- Eastern Montpellier snake
- Egyptian spiny-tailed lizard
- White-lipped pit viper
- Borneo python
- Western whip snake
- European cat snake
- Leopard snake
- Pond slider
- Four-lined snake
- Ursini's viper
- Horned viper
- Common European adder
- Dice snake
- Caspian turtle
- Balkan whip snake
- Caspian whipsnake
- Eastern box turtle
- Red-footed tortoise
- Egyptian tortoise
- Chinese softshell turtle
- Golden coin turtle
- Leopard tortoise
- Roti Island snake-necked turtle
- Hermann's tortoise
- Marginated tortoise
- African spurred tortoise
- Alligator snapping turtle
- Giant Asian pond turtle
- Hilaire's side-necked turtle
- Radiated tortoise
- Puff adder
- Burmese python
- Black-tailed rattlesnake
- Western Gaboon viper
- Honduran milk snake
- Sinaloan milk snake
- Cuban crocodile
- Philippine crocodile
- Ball python
- Corn snake
- Mossy New Caledonian gecko
- Nile crocodile
- Cuvier's dwarf caiman
- Brown rainbow boa
- Boa constrictor
- Garden tree boa
- Green anaconda
- Madagascar day gecko
- Green tree python
- Sudan plated lizard
- Eastern bearded dragon
- Rainbow skink
- Common chuckwalla
- Chinese crocodile lizard
- Komodo dragon
- Caiman lizard
- Cuban rock iguana
- Rio Fuerte beaded lizard
- Blue spiny lizard
- Solomon Islands skink
- Baja blue rock lizard

==== Invertebrates ====
Some of the invertebrates include:

- Giant African land snail
- Giant cave cockroach
- Giant spiny stick insect
- Black beauty stick insect
- Pink-winged stick insect
- Vietnamese walking stick
- Migratory locust
- Sun beetle
- Garden fruit chafer
- Western honey bee
- Two-spotted assassin bug
- Indian rose mantis
- Madagascar hissing cockroach
- Brazilian red and white tarantula
- Socotra Island blue baboon tarantula
- Mexican foreleg tarantula
- Mexican red-knee tarantula
- Giant African millipede
- Giant Philippine stick insect
- Emperor scorpion
- Banded coral shrimp
- Philippine leaf insect

== Gallery ==
Zagreb Zoo

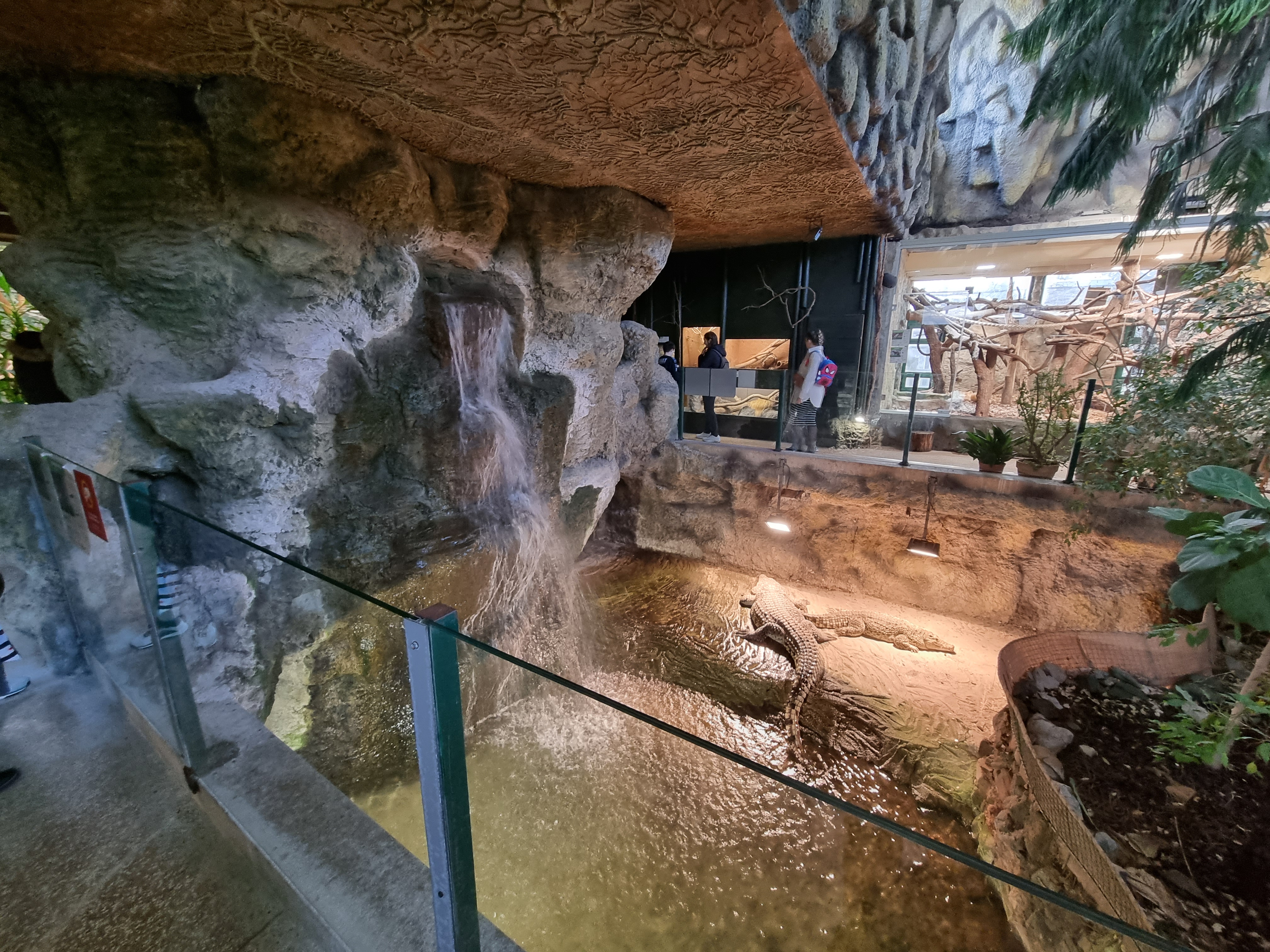
Tropical House

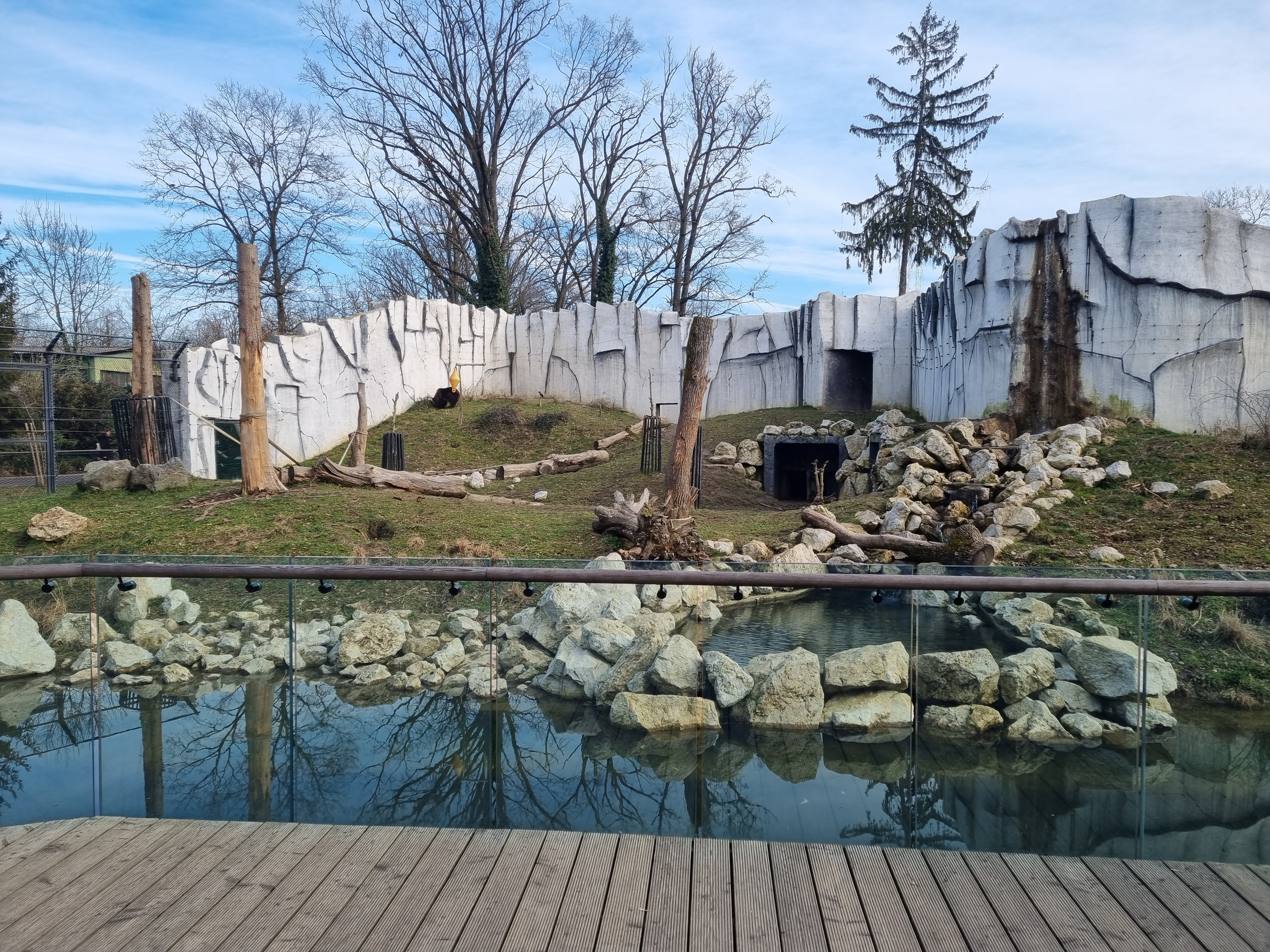
Zoo houses for brown bears

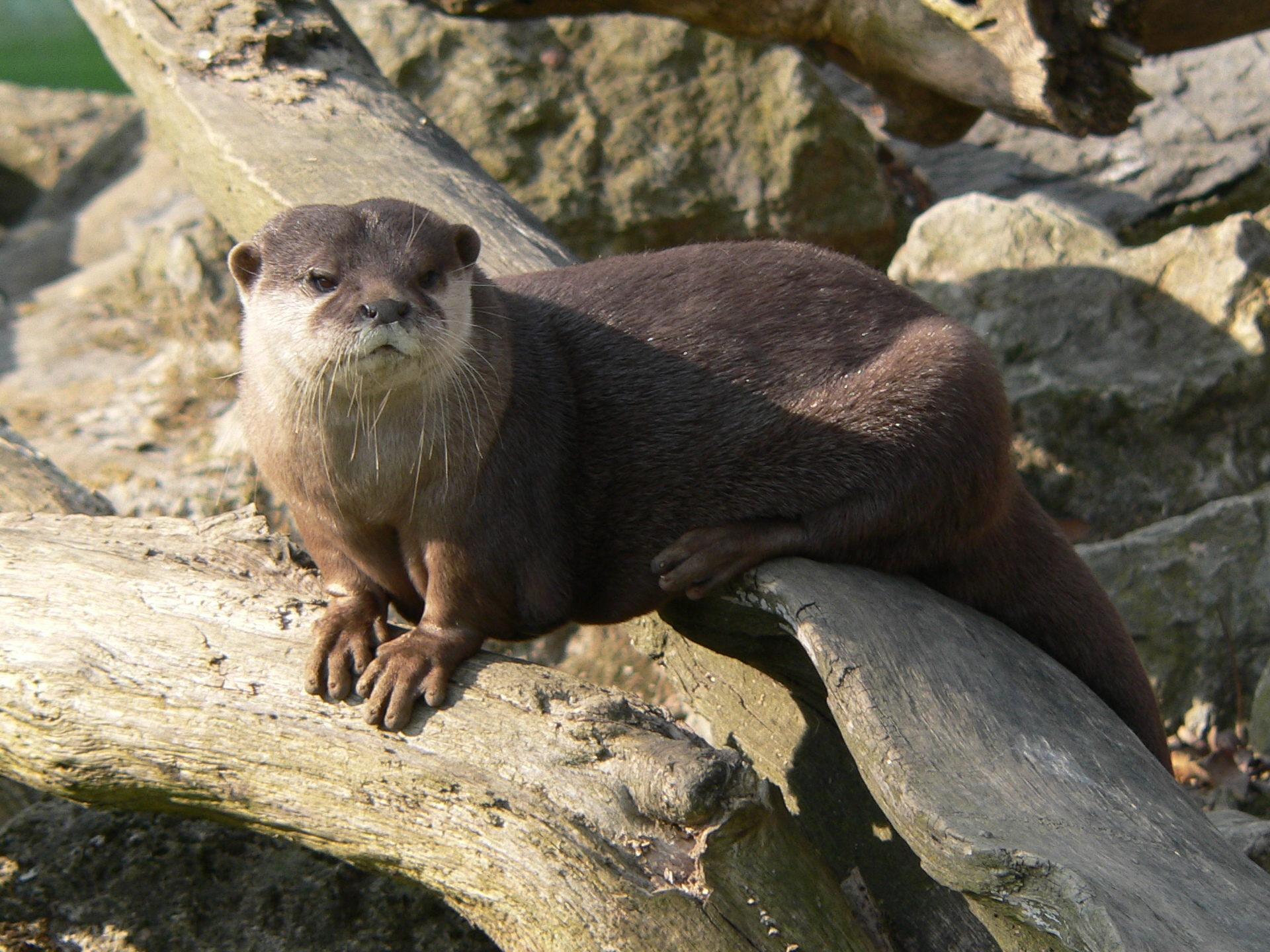
Small clawed otter

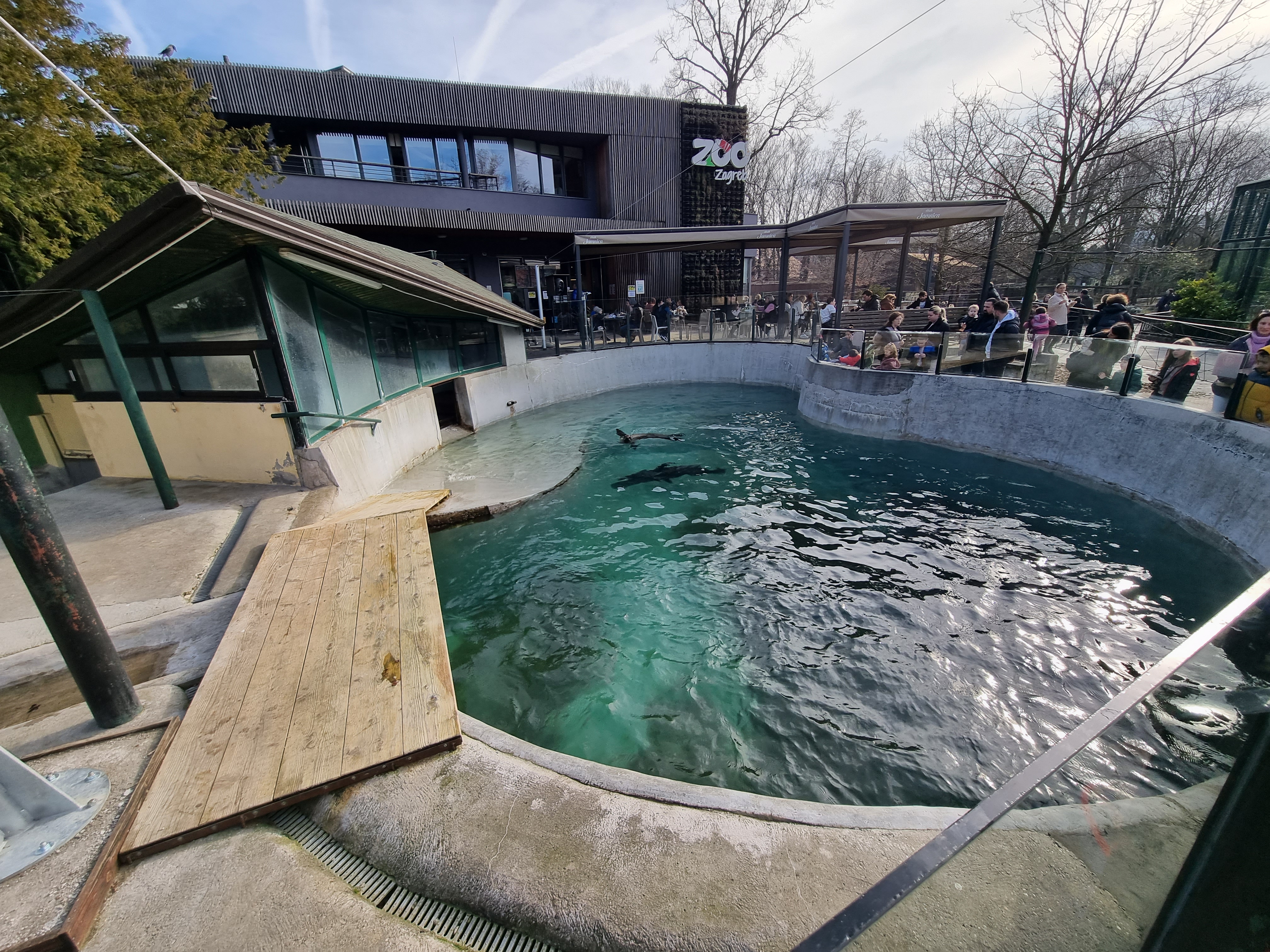
Sea lion pool

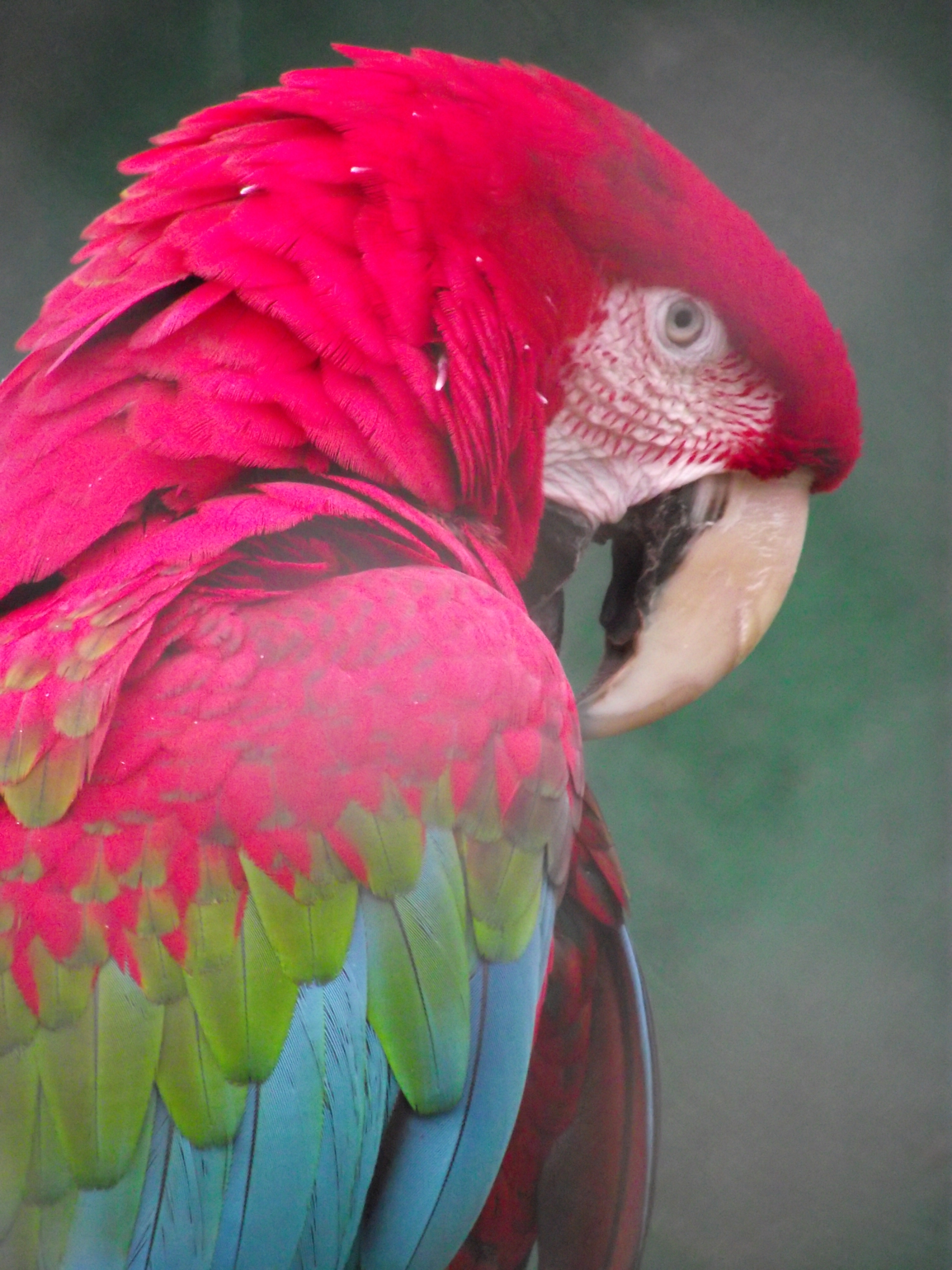
Scarlet macaw

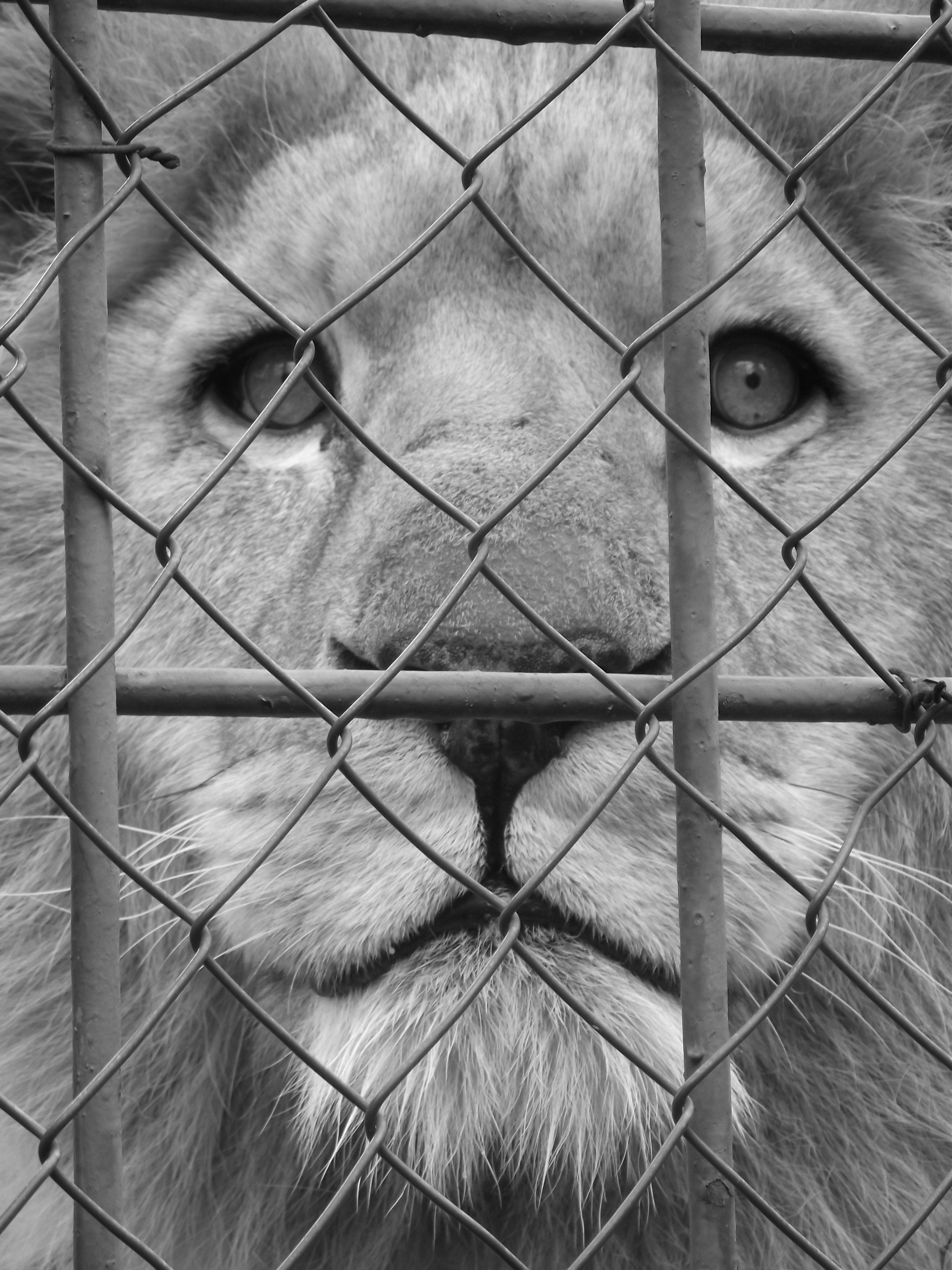
African Lion

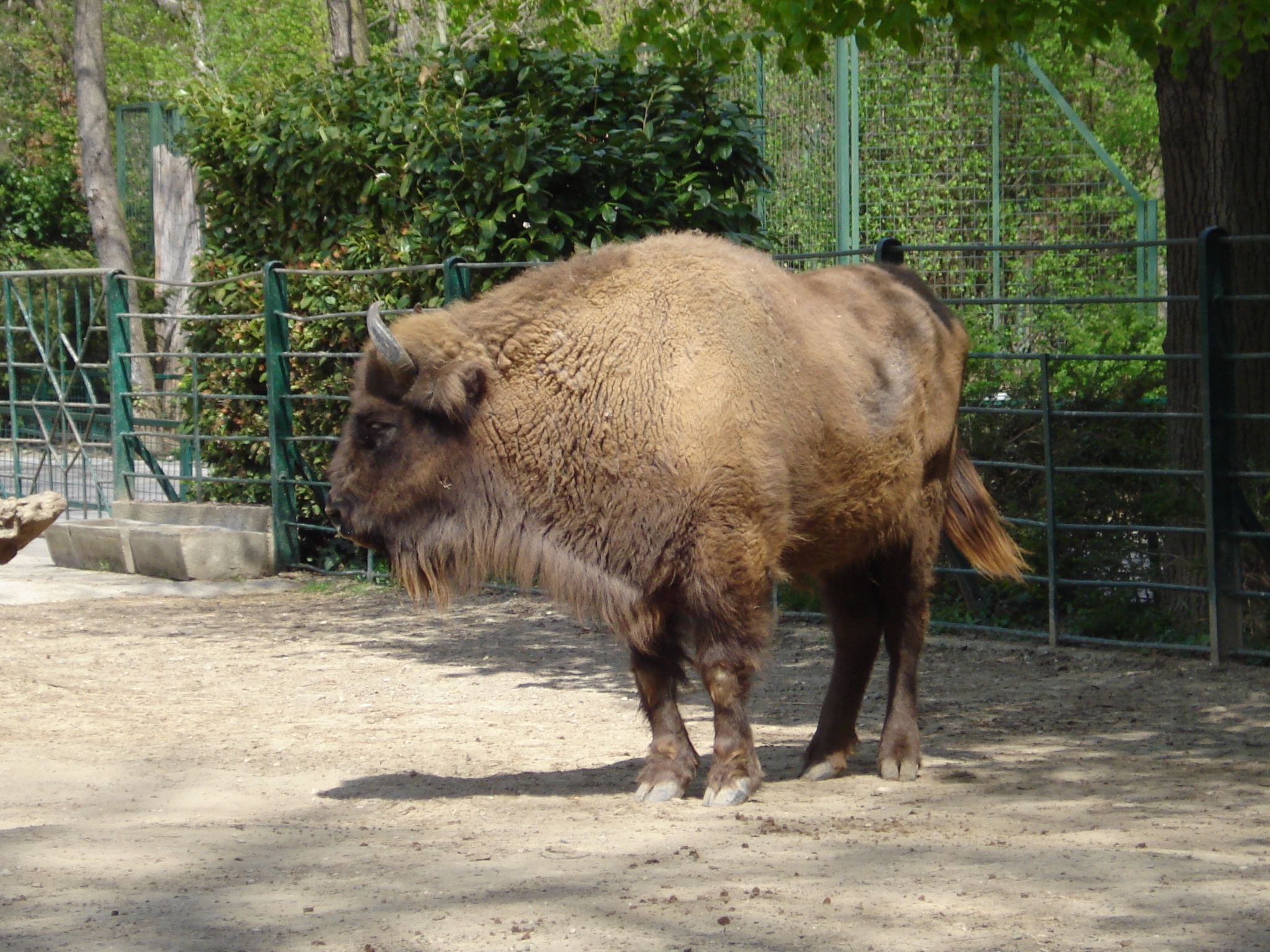
European bison

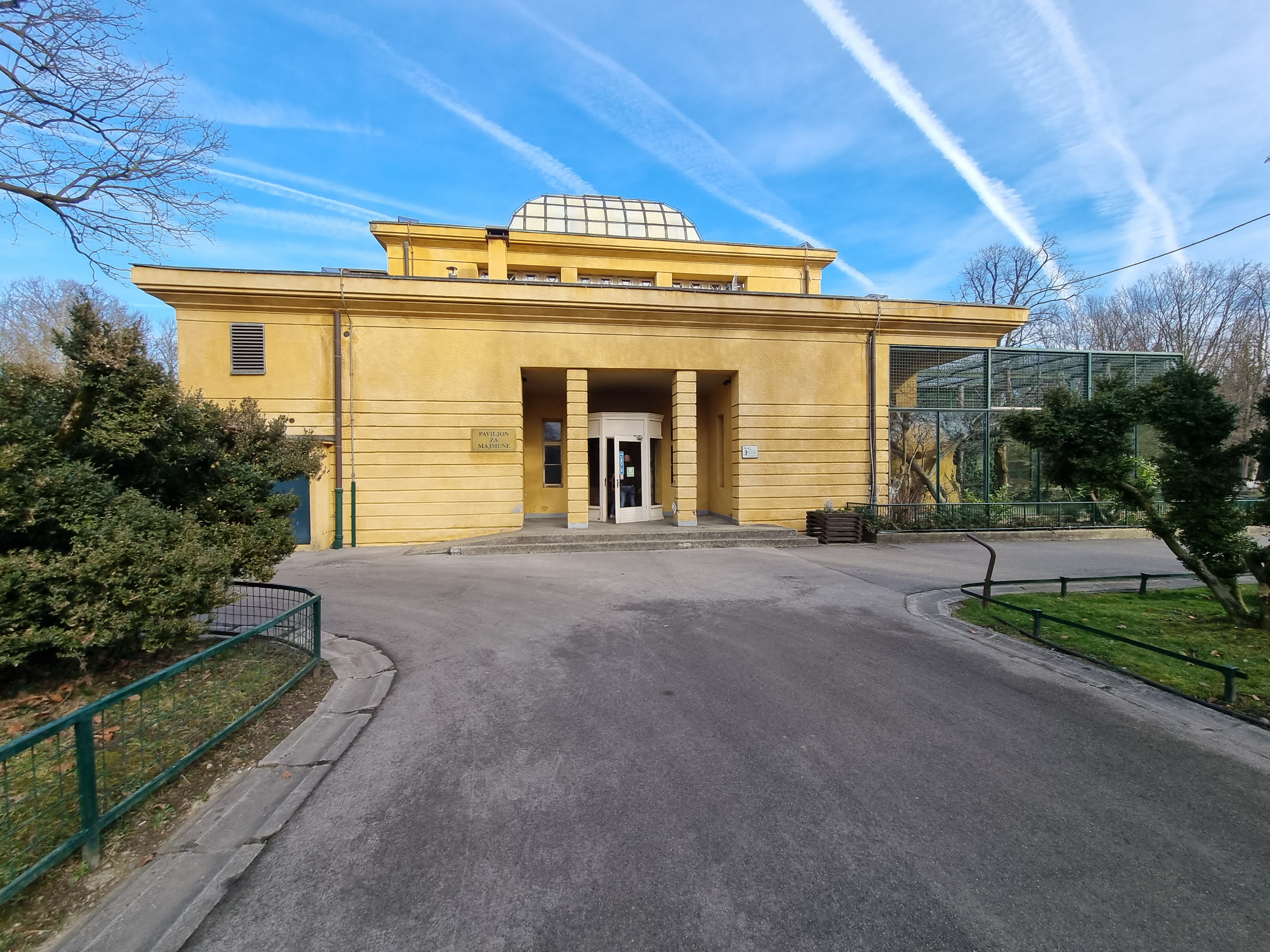
Monkey Pavilion

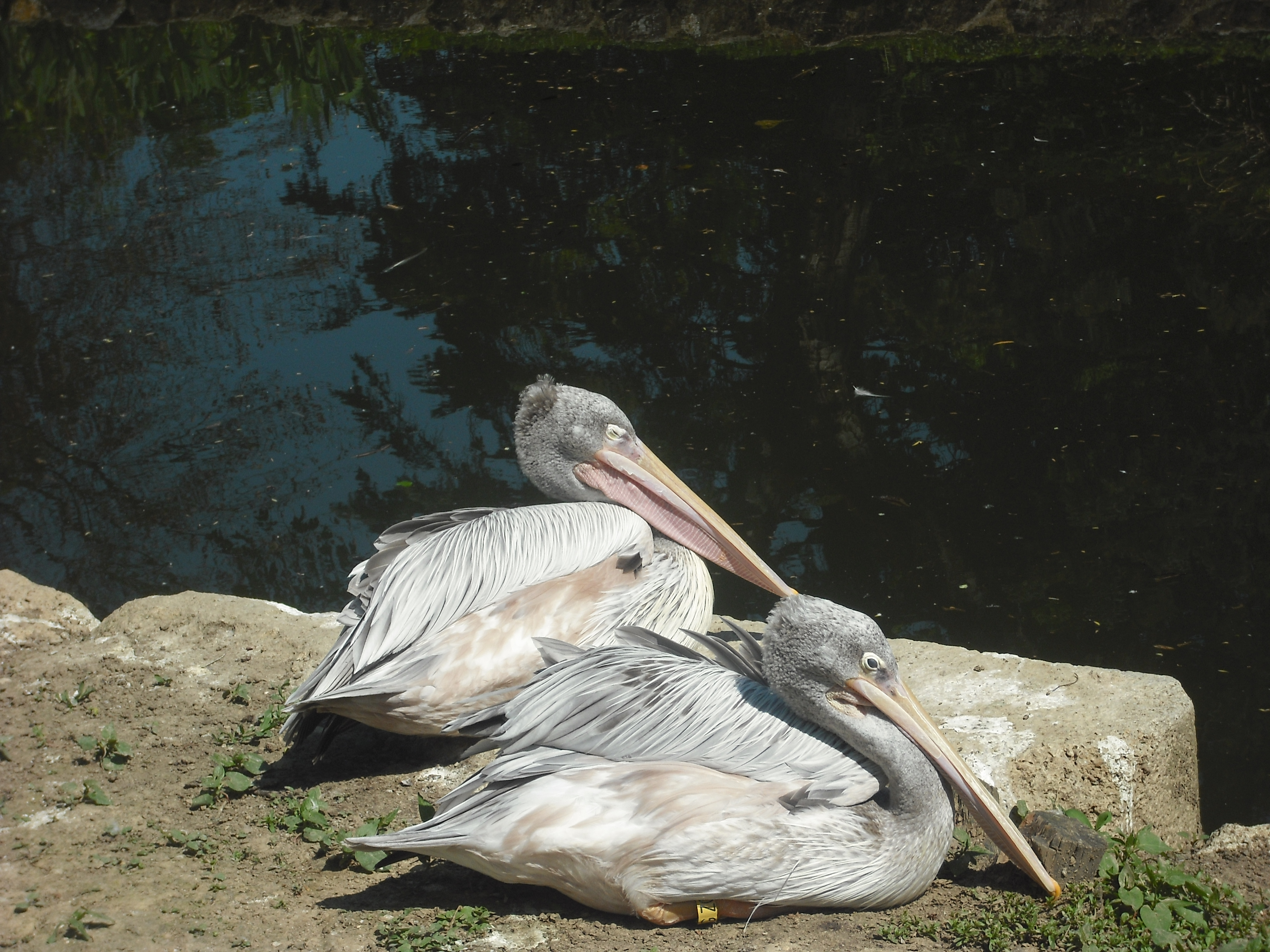
Pelicans

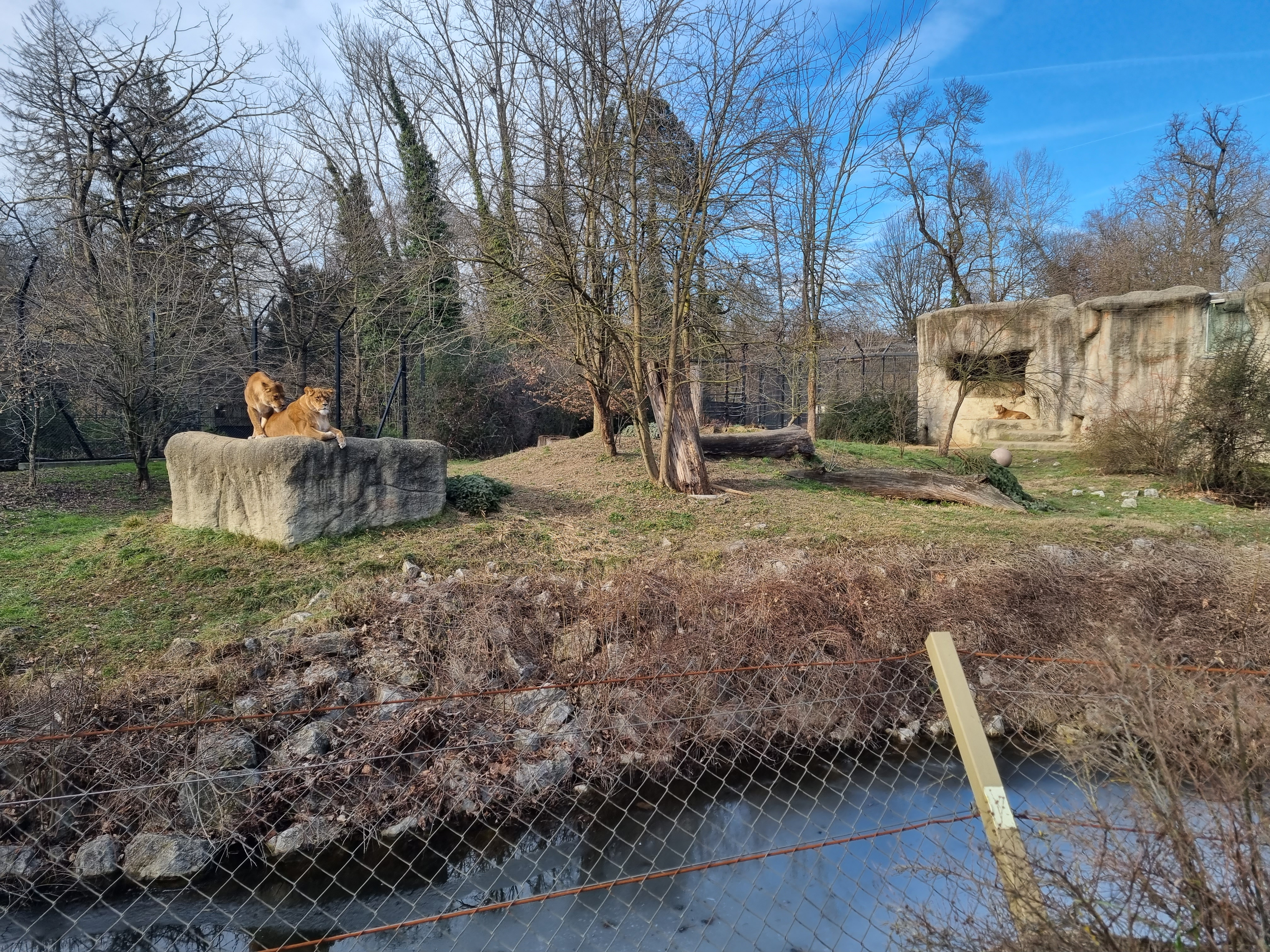
House for lions

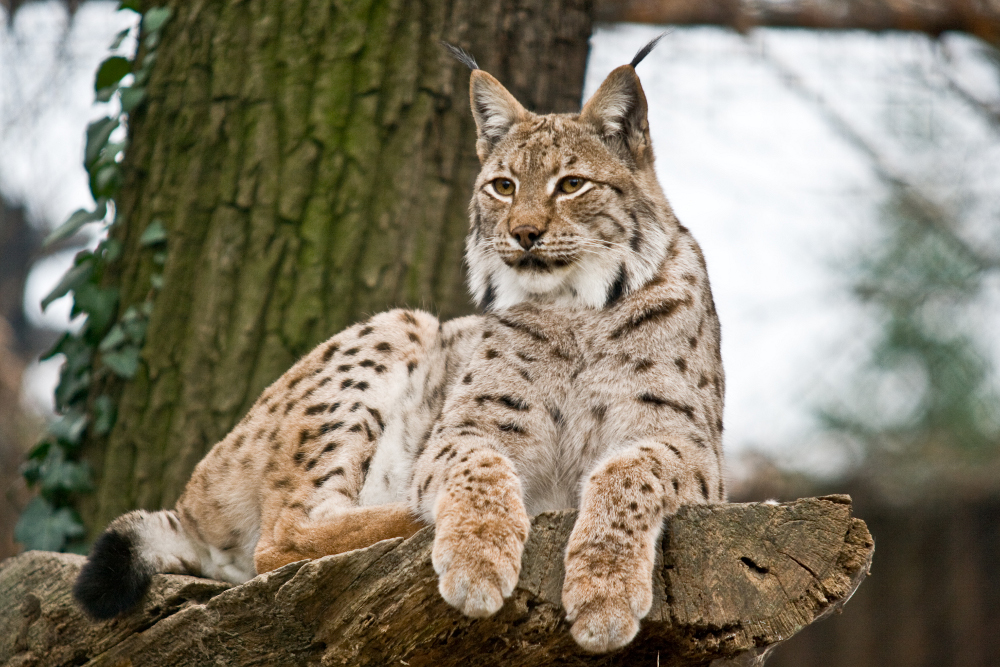
European lynx

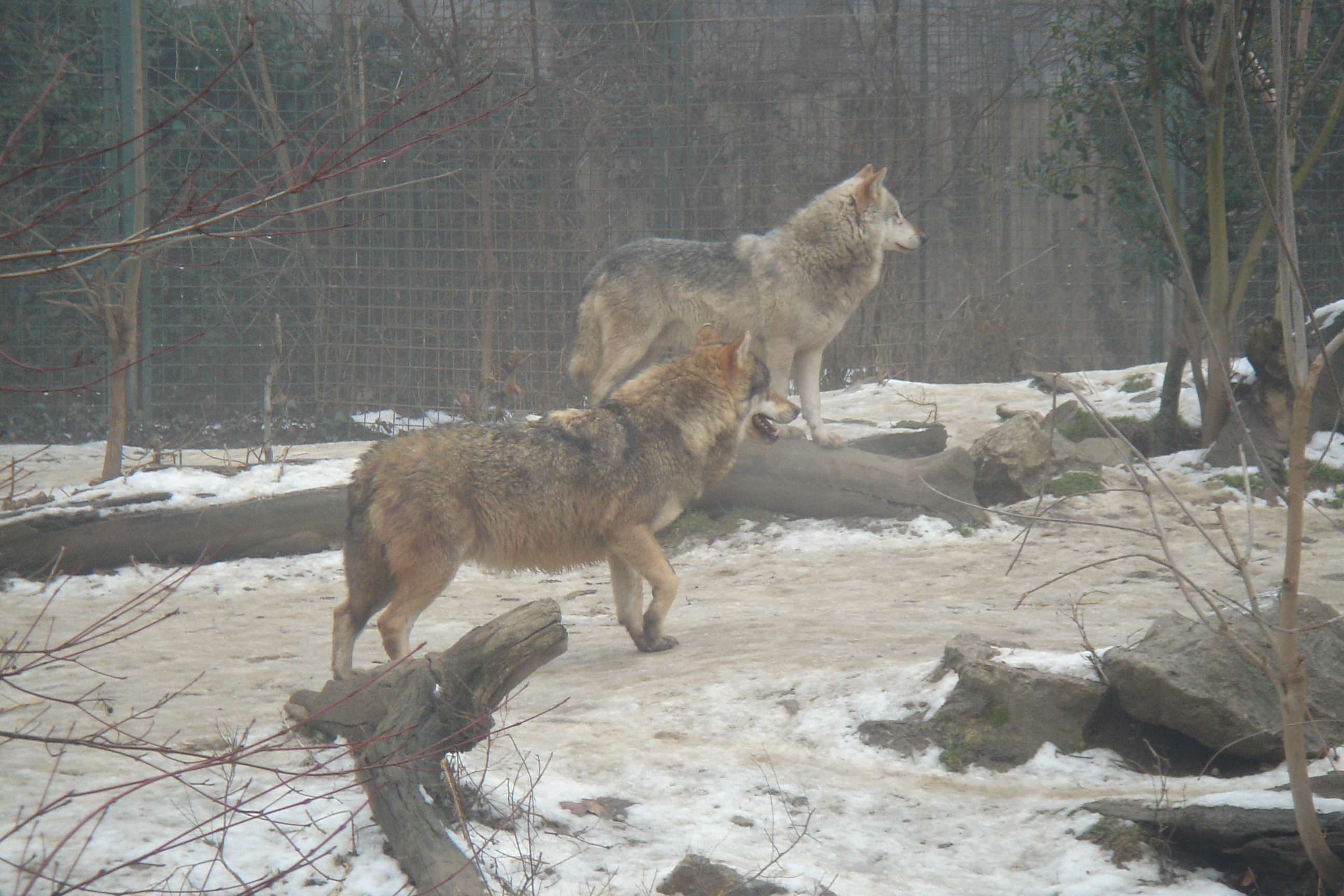
Gray wolves
