= Gavião of Jiparaná =

Tupian language spoken in Brazil

- Gavião of Rondônia
- Ikó̱ló̱éhj
- Native to: Brazil
- Region: Rondônia
- Ethnicity: 520 Gavião (2004), 787 Zoró (2020)
- Native speakers: 340 (2006)
- Language family: Tupian: Monde; Gavião of Jiparaná
- Dialects: Zoró

Language codes
- ISO 639-3: gvo
- Glottolog: gavi1246 Gavião do Jiparaná zoro1244 Zoró
- ELP: Gavião
- Zoró
- Linguasphere: 88-EAB-ab
- 88-EAB-ac
- 88-EAB-ag

Gaviao of Jiparana (Gavião do Jiparaná), also known as "Digüt" (a chief's name), Ikolen and Gavião do Rondônia, or in the language itself, Ikó̱ló̱éhj, is the language of the Gavião of Rondônia, Brazil. It is a Tupian language of the Monde branch. It is partially intelligible with Suruí. The Zoró dialect spoken by the Zoró people is sometimes considered a separate language.

== Phonology ==
=== Consonants ===
Gavião consonants
		Labial	Alveolar	Alveolopalatal	Velar	Glottal
Occlusive	voiceless	p	t		k	ʔ
Occlusive	voiced	b	d		g	
Affricate	voiceless		ts	tʃ		
Affricate	voiced		dz			
Fricative	voiceless	β				
Fricative	voiced					
Lateral	voiced		l			
Flap			r			
Approximant				j		

=== Vowels ===
Gavião vowels
		Front		Central		Back	
		plain	nasal	plain	nasal	plain	nasal
High	short	i	ĩ	ɨ	ɨ̃		
High	long	iː	ĩː	ɨː	ɨ̃ː		
Mid	short	e	ẽ			o	õ
Mid	long	eː	ẽː			oː	õː
Low	short			a	ã		
Low	long			aː	ãː		
