= Gavião (Rondônia) =

Total population
- 220 (1990s)

Regions with significant populations
- Rondônia

Languages
- Gavião of Jiparaná

Related ethnic groups
- Arara and Zoró

The Gavião, also known as the Ikoro or Digút, are an Indigenous people native to Rondônia, Brazil. Their population was around 220 in the 1990s. Their language, Gavião of Jiparaná, is a Tupian language in the Monde branch.

Like the closely related Arara and Zoró, the Gavião traditionally lived on agriculture and hunting, but their traditional lifestyle was disrupted by rubber booms in Rondônia during the 20th century. They declined dramatically through epidemics and violence in the 1940s, and their population dropped below 100 people. In the 1966, the New Tribes Mission introduced medical care, and the population increased to over 200 in the 1980s. The Brazilian government established boundaries around their traditional land in 1977, although growth and development in Rondônia continues to threaten them.
