= Peccari =

Peccari may refer to:

- Peccary (also javelina or skunk pig), a medium-sized hoofed mammal of the family Tayassuidae (New World pigs) in the suborder Suina
- Pecari, a genus of mammals in the peccary family, Tayassuidae
