= Cinta Larga language =

Tupian dialect cluster of Brazil

Cinta Larga
- Native to: Brazil
- Region: Mato Grosso
- Ethnicity: Cinta Larga
- Native speakers: 650 (2012) mostly monolingual
- Language family: Tupian: Monde; Cinta Larga

Language codes
- ISO 639-3: cin
- Glottolog: cint1239
- ELP: Cinta Larga

Cinta Larga is a Tupian dialect cluster of Brazil, the largest language of the Monde branch.

According to Moore (2005), Arara do Rio Guariba (Guariba River Arara), spoken in the northern part of Aripuanã Indigenous Park, is closely related to the Cinta Larga dialect cluster, and also shares some features with Suruí. 26 words were collected by Hargreaves in 2001. This language remains unclassified due to the lack of data.

== Phonology ==
=== Vowels ===
Cinta Larga vowels
	Front	Central	Back
Close	i ĩ	ɨ ɨ̃	
Mid	e ẽ		o õ
Open		a ã	

=== Consonants ===
Cinta Larga consonants
		Labial	Dental	Alveolar		Palatal	Velar	Glottal
		Labial	Dental	plain	pal.	Palatal	Velar	Glottal
Stop		p		t	tʲ		k	ʔ
Fricative	plain		s			ɕ		
Fricative	prenasal		ⁿz					
Nasal		m		n		ɲ	ŋ	
Approximant		w		l		j		

Allophones of consonant phonemes
Phoneme	Allophones
/p/	[p], [pʰ], [pʼ], [p̚]
/t/	[t], [tʰ], [tʼ], [t̚], [ɾ]
/tʲ/	[tʲ], [tʰʲ], [ʲtʲ], [ʲt̚]
/k/	[k], [kʰ], [kʼ], [k̚]
/s/	[s̪], [θ]
/ⁿz/	[ⁿ̪z̪], [ⁿ̪ð]
/ɕ/	[ɕ], [tᶝʰ]
/m/	[m], [ᵐb], [b]
/n/	[n], [ⁿd], [d]
/ɲ/	[ɲ], [ʲɲ], [ʲɲʲ], [ɲʲ̃], [ᶮj̃], [ᶮʑ], [ɡᶽ]
/ŋ/	[ŋ], [ᵑɡ], [ɡ]
/w/	[w], [w̃]
/j/	[j], [j̃]
