= Aruá language (Rondônia) =

Nearly extinct Tupian language of Brazil

Aruá
- Native to: Brazil
- Region: Rondônia, Mato Grosso
- Ethnicity: 121 Aruá (2020)
- Native speakers: 5 (2014)
- Language family: Tupian: Monde; Aruá
- Dialects: Aruáshi

Language codes
- ISO 639-3: arx
- Glottolog: arua1261
- ELP: Aruá
- Linguasphere: 88-EAB-aa
- Aruáshi is classified as Critically Endangered by the UNESCO Atlas of the World's Languages in Danger.

Aruá is a nearly extinct Tupian language of the states of Rondônia and Mato Grosso, in the Amazon region of Brazil. There were 121 Aruá in 2020 and 5 people who speak Aruá as a maternal language.

== Linguistic features ==
- Consonants: Aruá exhibits a typical Tupian consonant inventory, including stops (/p/, /t/, /k/), nasals (/m/, /n/), and glides (/w/, /j/)
- Vowels: A five-vowel system (/a/, /e/, /i/, /o/, /u/) with nasalization contrasts.
- Morphology: Agglutinative structure with extensive verb serialization. Example: kõjã-pit ("to walk-while-talking").
- Syntax: Subject–Object–Verb (SOV) word order, common in Tupian languages.
