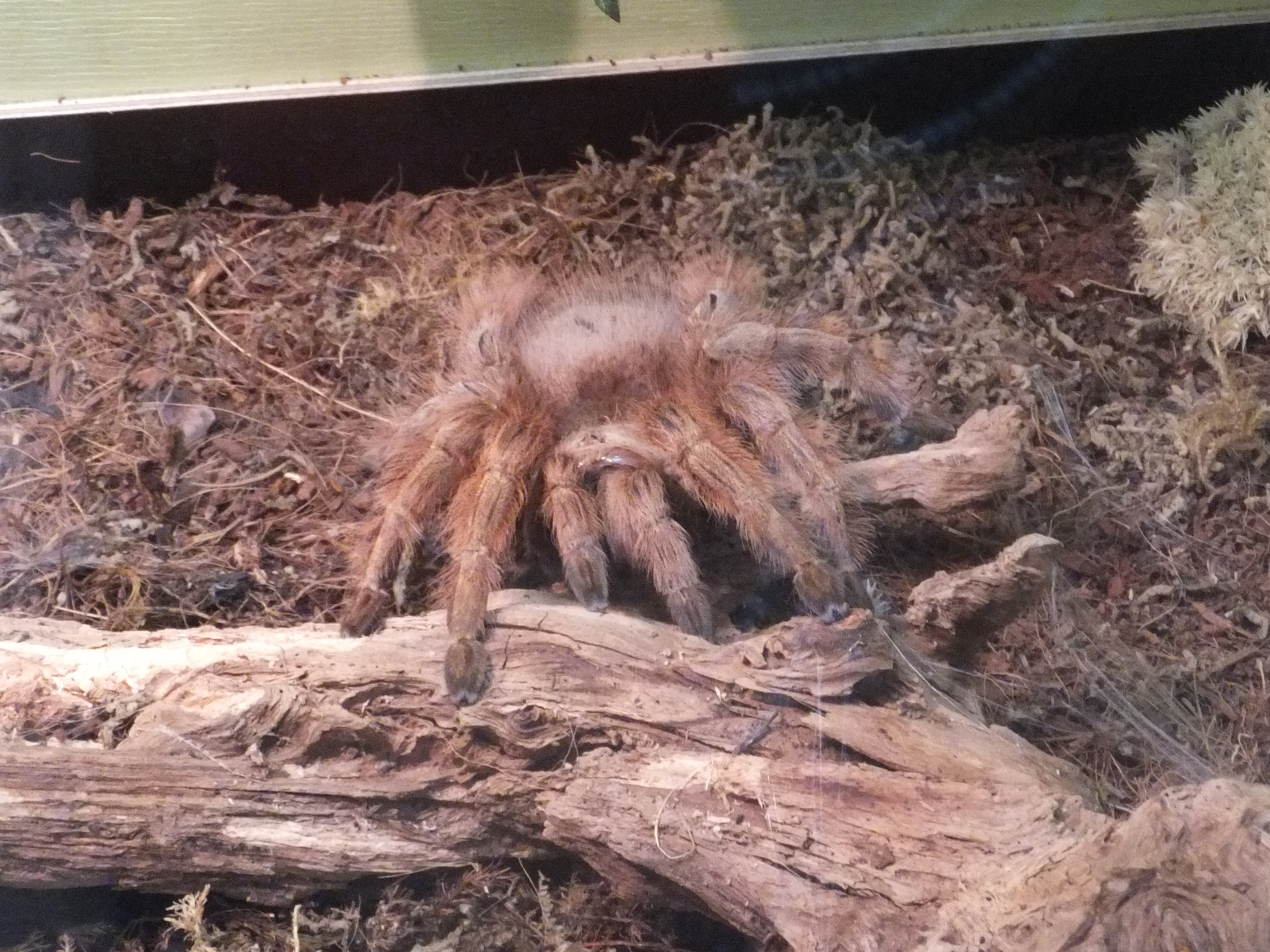

Scientific classification
- Kingdom: Animalia
- Phylum: Arthropoda
- Subphylum: Chelicerata
- Class: Arachnida
- Order: Araneae
- Infraorder: Mygalomorphae
- Family: Theraphosidae
- Genus: Nhandu
- Species: N. tripepii

Binomial name
- Nhandu tripepii Dresco, 1984

= Nhandu tripepii =

Species of spider

Nhandu tripepii, also known as the Brazilian giant blonde tarantula, is a spider species, and is a theraphosine theraphosid. It is native to Brazil.

== Taxonomy ==
Nhandu tripepii was originally described as Eurypelma tripepii by Edouard Dresco in 1984, then changed to Hapalopelma tripeppi by Robert Raven in 1985. Meanwhile, in 1998, Gunter Schmidt described Vitalius vulpinus as a separate species, with Rogério Bertani changing the name to Nhandu vulpinus in 2001. Roberto Nagahama, Caroline Fukushima, and Bertani recognized H. tripepii as Nhandu tripepii and made N. vulpinus a senior synonym of N. tripepii.

== Characteristics ==
Nhandu tripepii has a tibial spur, and when this is flexed, the retrolateral branch touches the first metatarsus. The female is distinguished by its long spermathecae and solid colouration. The type male is 5 cm, and the female is 8 cm.

== As a pet ==
Nhandu tripepii is skittish and quite aggressive; therefore, it is not ideal for beginners. It has weak venom but urticating hair. It has 500-1500 spiderlings and is relatively easy to breed. Females have a lifespan of 10 years in captivity but as they grow quickly, reach maturity at about three years. It needs a temperature of 25-29 °C and a humidity of 75-80%.
