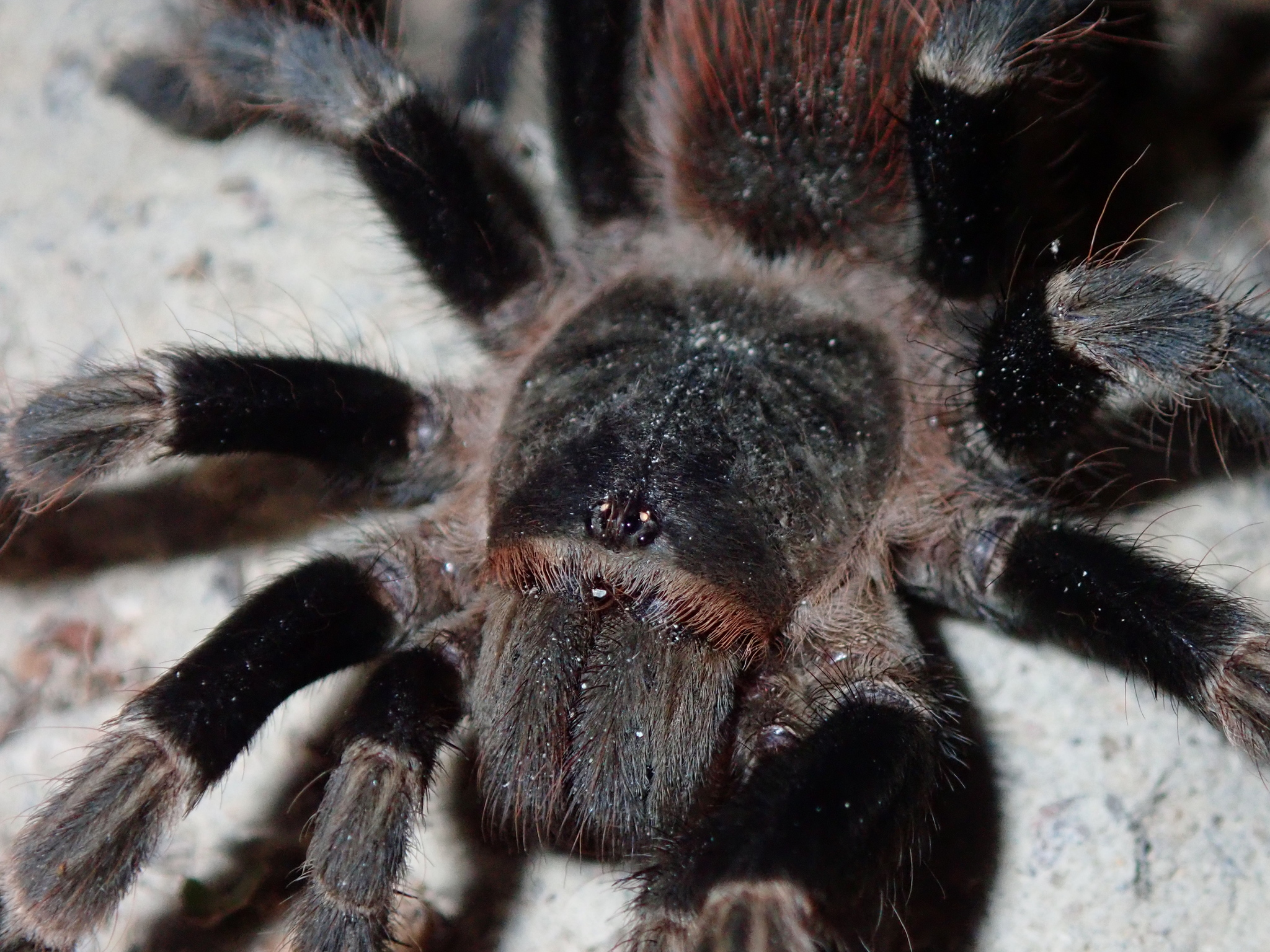

Scientific classification
- Kingdom: Animalia
- Phylum: Arthropoda
- Subphylum: Chelicerata
- Class: Arachnida
- Order: Araneae
- Infraorder: Mygalomorphae
- Family: Theraphosidae
- Genus: Nhandu
- Species: N. cerradensis

Binomial name
- Nhandu cerradensis Bertani, 2001

= Nhandu cerradensis =

Species of spider

Nhandu cerradensis is a species of spider from the genus Nhandu. The species is originally described by Rogério Bertani in 2001.

== Sources ==
- The Journal of arachnology. Vol. v.46:no.2 (2018). American Arachnological Society. 2018. p. 215.
- Media related to Nhandu cerradensis at Wikimedia Commons
