= Kabanaé language =

Extinct Tupian language

Kabanaé
- Arara
- Native to: Brazil
- Region: Aripuanã River
- Ethnicity: "Arara"
- Era: attested 1829
- Language family: Tupian: Mondé; Kabanaé

Language codes
- ISO 639-3: None (mis)
- Glottolog: None suru1262 Suruí

Kabanaé (Arara) is an extinct Tupian language of the Mondé group, formerly spoken at the mouth of the Aripuanã River by the "Arara nation". It is solely documented by an 1829 wordlist by Johann Natterer. It is very similar to Matanau, which was spoken in the same region.
