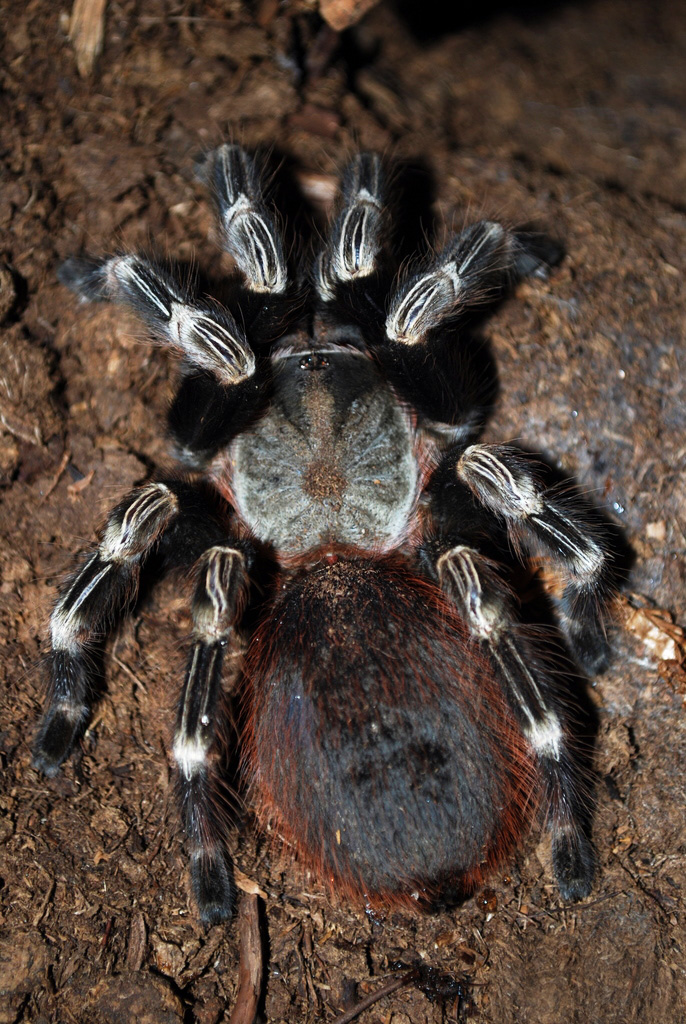
- Nhandu chromatus

Scientific classification
- Kingdom: Animalia
- Phylum: Arthropoda
- Subphylum: Chelicerata
- Class: Arachnida
- Order: Araneae
- Infraorder: Mygalomorphae
- Family: Theraphosidae
- Genus: Nhandu; Lucas, 1983

Type species
- N. carapoensis Lucas, 1983

Species
- 6, see text

Synonyms
- Brazilopelma Schmidt, 1998

= Nhandu =

Genus of spiders

Nhandu is a genus of South American tarantulas that was first described by S. Lucas in 1983. Brazilopelma was synonymized with it in 2001.

== Diagnosis ==
They can be distinguished by the lack of stridulating organs, extension of the scopula on the metatarsus. They can also further be distinguished by the lack of spurs on the males and the palpal bulb with short embolus. Females also own a distinct spermatheca morphology.

== Species ==
As of March 2023 it contains 6 species, found in Paraguay, Guyana and Brazil:

- Nhandu carapoensis Lucas, 1983 (type) – Brazil, Paraguay
- Nhandu cerradensis Bertani, 2001 – Brazil
- Nhandu chromatus Schmidt, 2004 – Brazil
- Nhandu coloratovillosus (Schmidt, 1998) – Brazil
- Nhandu sylviae (Sherwood, Gabriel & Brescovit, 2023) – Guyana
- Nhandu tripepii (Dresco, 1984) – Brazil

=== In synonymy ===
- Nhandu tripartitus Schmidt, 1997 = Nhandu carapoensis
- Nhandu vulpinus (Schmidt, 1998) = Nhandu tripepii
