= Matanau language =

Extinct Tupian language

Matanau
- Native to: Brazil
- Region: Aripuanã River
- Ethnicity: Matanau
- Era: attested 1829
- Language family: Tupian: Mondé; Matanau

Language codes
- ISO 639-3: None (mis)
- Glottolog: None suru1262 Suruí

Matanau is an extinct Tupian language of the Mondé group, formerly spoken at the mouth of the Aripuanã River. It is solely documented by an 1829 wordlist by Johann Natterer. It is very similar to Kabanaé, which was spoken in the same region.

== Vocabulary ==
Matanau vocabulary
gloss	Matanau
cotton	a-kum-ziri
mouth	un-go
head	un-ndara
star	zoikab
fire	mukaen
sister	ambooi
lake	ikara
moon	gate-gat
axe	dabe-ʔaa
tree	iipui
wood	iib
hand	mabé
corn	meek
eye	un-za-kaba
jaguar	meko
ear	un-debipe
foot	bi-peːa
stone	caa
fish	bolib
white-lipped peccary	bebe
fox	awlöü
river	ikabe
blood	un-sziri
sun	gat
tobacco	manʃo
sand	a-ngiira
vulture	uikuu
