= Mondé language =

Endangered Tupian language spoken in Brazil

Mondé
- Salamãi, Sanamaica
- Native to: Brazil
- Region: Rondônia
- Ethnicity: 10 Salamãi (2006?)
- Native speakers: 2 semispeakers (2014)
- Language family: Tupian: Monde languages; Mondé

Language codes
- ISO 639-3: mnd
- Glottolog: sala1273
- ELP: Mondé
- Linguasphere: 88-EAA-aa

Mondé, or Salamãi, is a nearly extinct Tupian language of the state of Rondônia, in the Amazon region of Brazil.

Other names include Sanamaikã, Sanamaicá, Salamãi.
