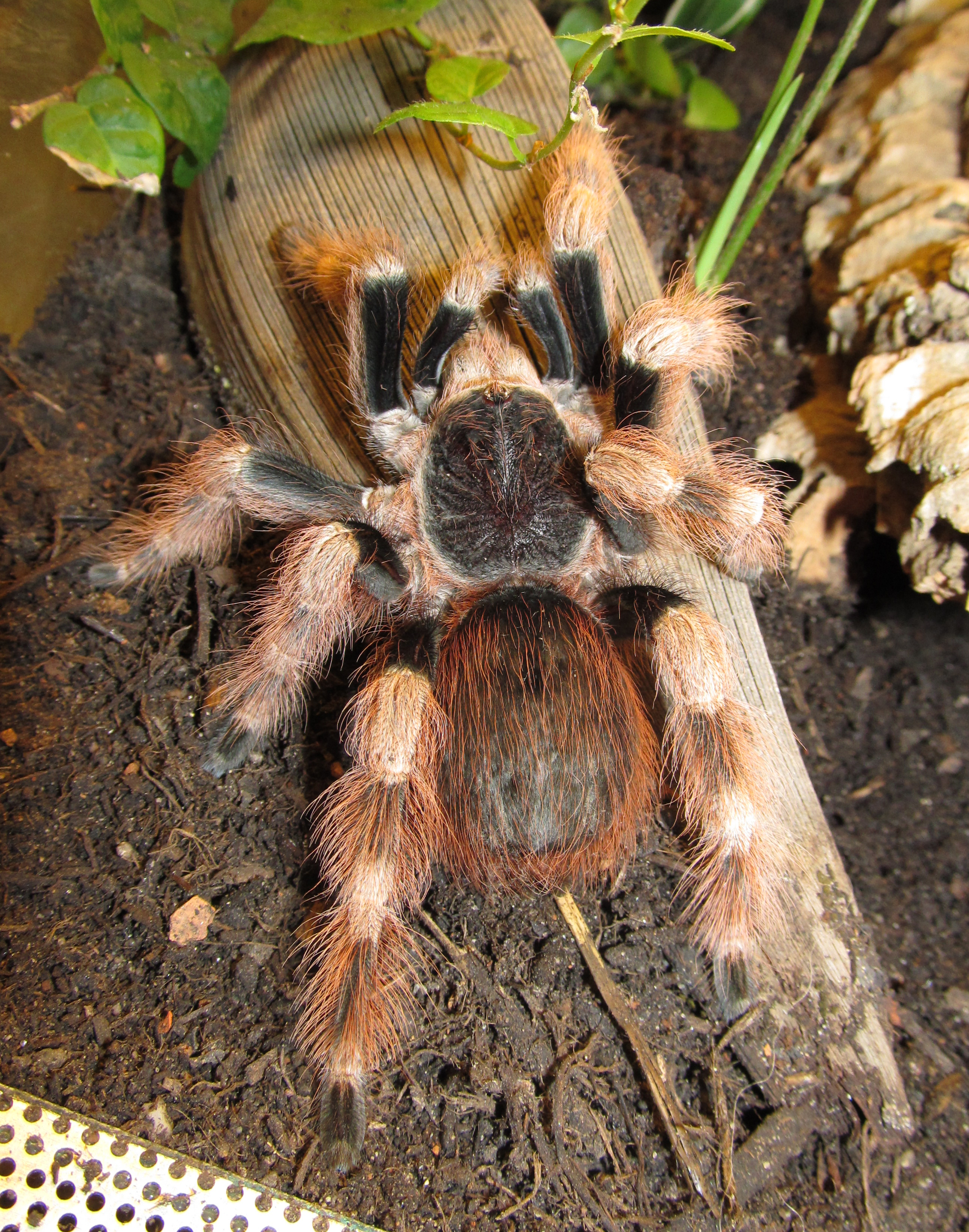

Scientific classification
- Kingdom: Animalia
- Phylum: Arthropoda
- Subphylum: Chelicerata
- Class: Arachnida
- Order: Araneae
- Infraorder: Mygalomorphae
- Family: Theraphosidae
- Genus: Nhandu
- Species: N. coloratovillosus

Binomial name
- Nhandu coloratovillosus (Schmidt, 1998)

= Nhandu coloratovillosus =

Species of first

Nhandu coloratovillosus also known as the Brazilian black & white tarantula or the bombardier tarantula, is a species of tarantula first described by Günter Schmidt in 1998. They are found in the grasslands of Brazil and Paraguay, and are terrestrial tarantulas.

== Description ==
Females live 15 years, while males only to 4 years. Their carapace is black, with an alternating black and white pattern, starting with black and ending with black. Their legs and opisthosoma are covered in orange hairs, making the white parts of the legs look dirty. Their opisthosoma is black covered in long orange hairs.

== Habitat ==
They are found in the grasslands of Brazil and Paraguay. These grasslands may reach temperatures of up to 35 °C, and are in the negatives during winter. In these grasslands there is an average yearly rainfall of 1,200mm.

== Behavior ==
They are terrestrial tarantulas, each with their own personality. Some are incredibly docile, while others are way more nervous and skittish. Though most of them are willing to fling urticating hairs.
