= Arara =

Arara may refer to:

== Ethnic groups ==
- Arará, an African-Cuban ethnic group
- Arara (Pará), an indigenous people of Pará, Brazil
- Arara (Rondônia), an indigenous people of Rondônia, Brazil
- Arara, or Kwaza, an indigenous people of Rondônia, Brazil
- Arara, a term sometimes used for the Kayapo, an indigenous people of Mato Grosso and Pará in Brazil

== Languages ==
- Mato Grosso Arára language, formerly spoken in Mato Grosso, Brazil
- Pará Arára language, spoken by the Arara people of Pará, Brazil
- Arara language (Panoan), also called Shawannawa, a dialect of Yaminawa spoken in western Brazil

== Places ==
- Ar'ara, an Israeli Arab town in the Wadi Ara region in the Galilee
- Arara, Paraíba, a municipality in the state of Paraíba in northeastern Brazil
- Arara River (Acre), a river in Acre, Brazil
- Araras, city and county in the State of São Paulo, Brazil
- Arara, India, a census village in Assam

== Other uses ==
- Arara, a 1989 album by Sérgio Mendes
- "Ararara", a 2018 song by Adarsh Shinde
- Ararat (disambiguation)
