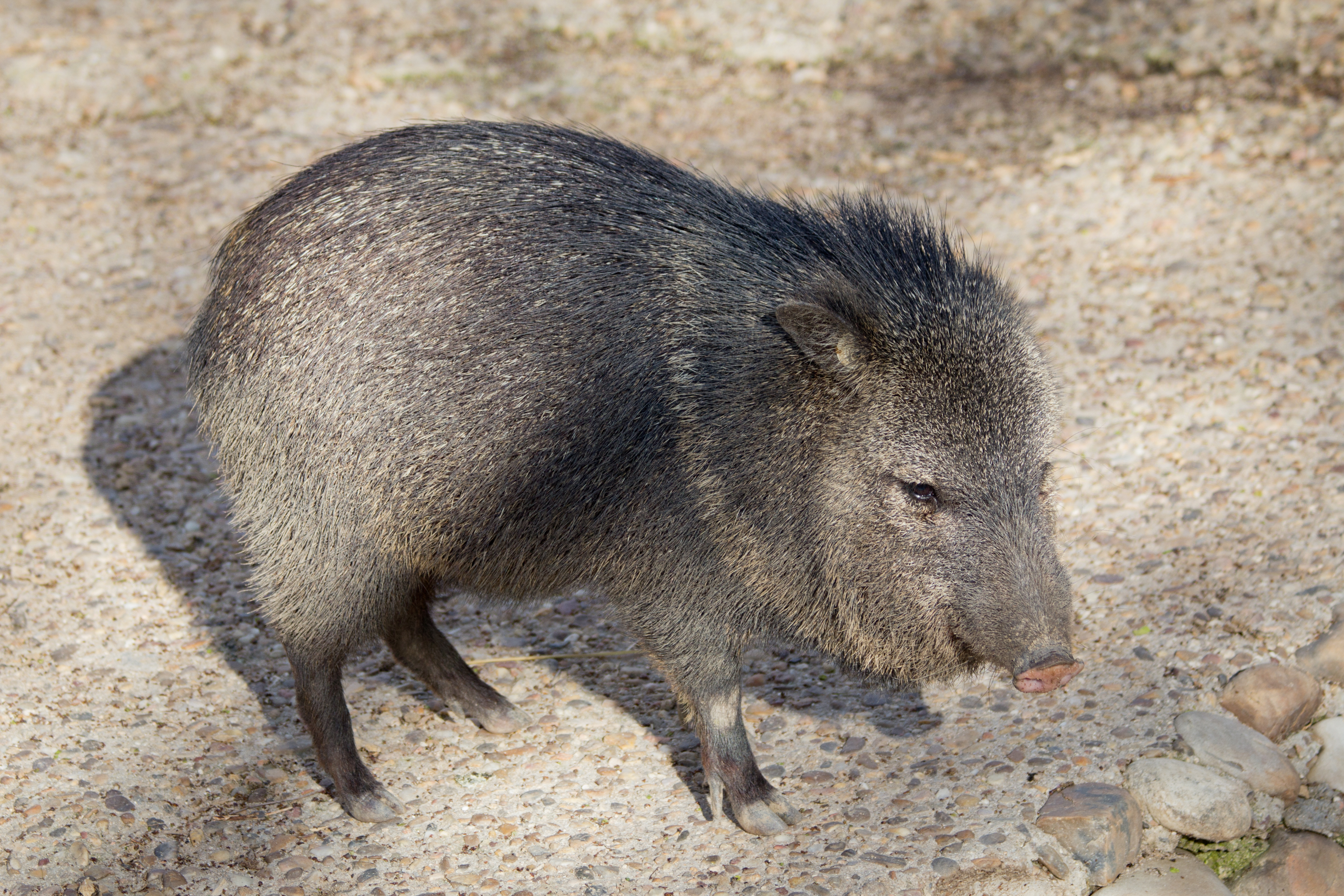
- At the Zoo of Madrid, Spain

Conservation status
- Least Concern (IUCN 3.1)
- CITES Appendix II (Note: Excluding the populations of Mexico and the United States of America.)

Scientific classification
- Kingdom: Animalia
- Phylum: Chordata
- Class: Mammalia
- Order: Artiodactyla
- Family: Tayassuidae
- Genus: Dicotyles
- Species: D. tajacu

Binomial name
- Dicotyles tajacu (Linnaeus, 1758)
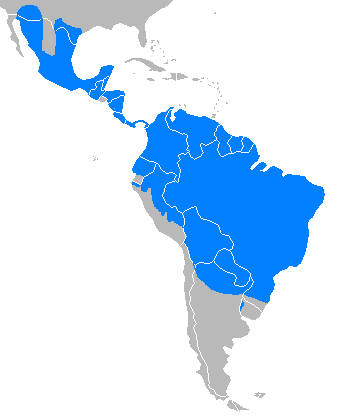

Synonyms
- Pecari tajacu; Sus tajacu Linnaeus, 1758; Muknalia minima Stinnesbeck et al, 2017; Dicotyles tajacu? Cuvier, 1817

= Collared peccary =

Collared peccary Temporal range: Pleistocene-recent

Species of mammal

The collared peccary (Dicotyles tajacu) is a peccary, a species of artiodactyl (even-toed) mammal in the family Tayassuidae. It is the only extant member of the genus Dicotyles. They are commonly referred to as javelina, saíno, taitetu, or báquiro, although these terms are also used to describe other species in the family. The species is also known as the musk hog. In Trinidad, it is colloquially known as quenk.

The species is found in the tropical and subtropical Americas. In the Miocene, the first Tayassuids appeared, which would give rise to the modern collared peccary, with these species belonging to the same genus and often being larger than it. It is believed that many of its ancestors initially appeared in North America, later migrating to South America and eventually giving rise to the modern Tayassu (Tayassu tajacu).

== Description ==
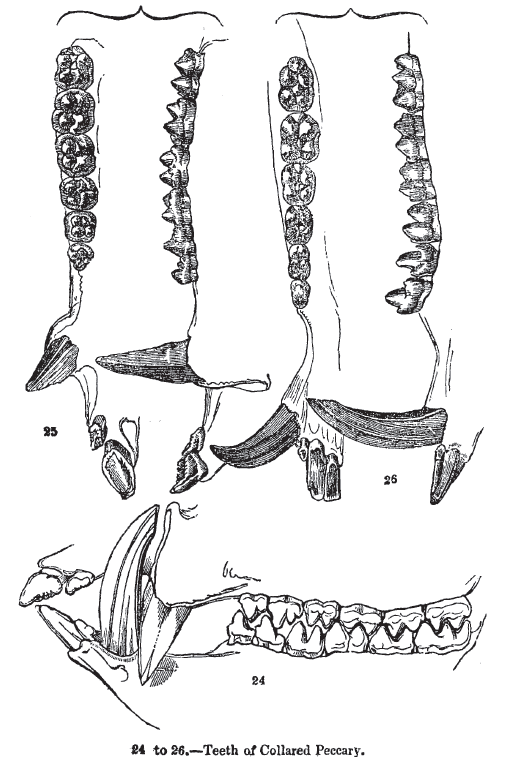
Dentition, as illustrated in Knight's Sketches in Natural History

The collared peccary stands around 51–61 cm (20–24 in) tall at the shoulder and is about 1.0–1.5 m (3 ft 3 in – 4 ft 11 in) long. It weighs between 16 and 27 kg (35 and 60 lb). The dental formula is: 2/3,1/1,3/3,3/3. The collared peccary has small tusks that point toward the ground when the animal is upright. It has slender legs with a robust or stocky body. The tail is often hidden in the coarse fur of the peccary. The animal has a musk gland on its back, several inches above the tail. This automatically discharges a skunklike scent when its hairs are raised in alarm, alerting other members of its herd. Peccary will also rub their scent onto rocks and tree stumps to mark their territory, and rub the scent on each other to help with identification.

Collared peccaries are diurnal creatures that live in groups of up to 50 individuals, averaging between six and nine animals. They sleep in burrows (often under bushes or larger systems of tree roots), but sometimes can be found in caves, abandoned mines, old desert tunnels, or among logs, felled trees and abandoned timber. However, collared peccaries are not completely diurnal. In central Arizona, they are often more active at night, and less so in the heat of the daytime.

== Taxonomy ==
Although somewhat related to true Old World pigs, and frequently referred to as a pig, this species and the other peccaries are no longer classified in the pig family, Suidae. Although formerly classified in the genus Pecari, studies in 2020 placed them in the genus Dicotyles, based on an unequivocal type-species selection; these studies have been accepted by the American Society of Mammalogists. Currently, the International Union for Conservation of Nature (IUCN) still places them in the genus Pecari.

=== The "giant peccary" ===
The giant peccary (described as Pecari maximus) was a purported fourth species of peccary, first reported to have been seen in Brazil in 2000 by Dutch naturalist Marc van Roosmalen. In 2003 German natural history filmmaker Lothar Frenz filmed a group and gathered a skull which later served as the type (INPA4272). It had been known locally as caitetú-mundè, which Roosmalen et al. state the locals claimed was Tupí and meant "the collared peccary that is bigger and goes in pairs", as opposed to caitetú-de-bando, "the collared peccary that goes in herds". It was formally described in 2007, but the scientific evidence for its species status was quickly questioned, which also was one of the reasons for its initial evaluation as data deficient by the IUCN in 2008. A review in 2011 moved the giant peccary into synonymy with the collared peccary (P. tajacu), which was followed by the IUCN the same year.

The reported range of the giant peccary encompasses the south-central Amazon between the Madeira and the Tapajós Rivers and northern Bolivia. It is restricted to terra firme forest, which is forest that does not flood annually. Unlike other peccaries in its range, the giant peccary was reported to mainly occur in pairs or small family groups.

According to its original description, the giant peccary is larger, longer-legged, and proportionally smaller-headed than the only other member of the genus, the collared peccary. Compared to most individuals of the sympatric populations of the collared peccary, the giant peccary also had thinner fur that is grizzled in brown and white, blacker legs, and a relatively faint collar. Five skins of the giant peccary had a total length of 120–137 cm (47–54 in), while local hunters have estimated a weight of 40–50 kg (88–110 lb). Based on a mtDNA study, the collared and the giant peccaries were estimated to have diverged 1.0–1.2 million years ago, but these results were later questioned due to the small sample size, low bootstrap support, and the absence of nDNA and cytogenetic results.

In 2011, a review noted that the measurements provided in the initial description were within those generally recognized for the collared peccary, and the behaviors supposedly unique to the giant peccary are also known from the collared peccary. They also provided new genetic evidence showing that collared peccaries from South America form a monophyletic group that includes the giant peccary (without it the group is paraphyletic). The major genetic split within the collared peccary is between a clade comprising North and Central American specimens, and a clade comprising South American specimens (the presumed contact zone is in Colombia, which has both clades). Furthermore, extensive infraspecific variations (both individual and locality-based) are known in the morphology of the collared peccary.

== Distribution and habitat ==
The collared peccary is widespread throughout much of the tropical and subtropical Americas, ranging from the Southwestern United States to northern Argentina. They were reintroduced to Uruguay in 2017, after 100 years of extirpation there. The only Caribbean island where it is native, however, is Trinidad. Until fairly recently, it was also present on the nearby island of Tobago, but is now exceedingly rare (if not extirpated) due to overhunting by humans. An adaptable species, it inhabits deserts, xeric shrublands, tropical and subtropical grasslands, savannas, shrublands, flooded grasslands and savannas, tropical and subtropical dry broadleaf forests, and several other habitats; it is also present in habitats shared by humans, merely requiring sufficient cover. Peccaries can be found in cities and agricultural land throughout their range, where they consume garden plants. Notable populations are known to exist in the suburbs of Phoenix and Tucson, Arizona.

=== Fossil record ===
Due to the lack of fossil material or even specimens from archeological sites, it was assumed that javelinas only recently crossed into the US from further south by way of Mexico, being previously excluded from the region by competition with the now-extinct flat-headed peccary (Platygonus compressus) and long-nosed peccary (Mylohyus nasutus). The first records of the species in its US range are from 18th-century Jesuit missions, and no evidence of remains is known from sites prior to 1700. However, in 2008, a fossil jaw of this species was discovered by paleontologist Andreas Kerner in the Peace River, DeSoto County, Florida, and subsequently described by Hulbert, Morgan & Kerner in 2009, proving that at some point in the late Pleistocene the species had already inhabited part of the Southern US and coexisted with the other two peccary species. The spread of javelinas throughout the Southwest may have been due to the overgrazing of native grasslands by livestock, leading to their replacement by cacti and mesquite, which are more desirable habitat for javelinas. The javelina is also known from fossils from Toca da Barriguda in Bahia, Brazil.

== Ecology ==
Collared peccaries are often classified as herbivores. They normally feed on cactus, mesquite beans, honey, fruits, berries, seeds, roots, tubers, bulbs, palm nuts, grasses, other green vegetation, fungi, and insects. However, they will also eat eggs, snakes, caterpillars, fish, frogs, lizards, dead birds, and rodents if the opportunity presents itself. Despite all this supplementary diet, the main dietary components of this species are agaves and prickly pears. In areas inhabited by humans, they also consume cultivated crops and ornamental plants, such as tulip bulbs.

The collared peccary's main predators are cougars (Puma concolor), wolves (Canis lupus), coyotes (Canis latrans), jaguars (Panthera onca) and possibly American crocodiles (Crocodylus acutus) and ocelots (Leopardus pardalis).

Although they usually ignore humans and tend to flee to safety, if wounded or cornered a peccary will defend itself with its tusks. If alarmed, a collared peccary can release its skunklike musk or give a sharp bark. Amazonian peoples (including the Shipibos) sometimes raise and tame juvenile collared peccaries, if they are encountered.

== Uses ==
The meat is relatively dry but can be cooked, though opinions differ about its flavor.

== Gallery ==
Video of a herd seen by a fixed camera in Arizona

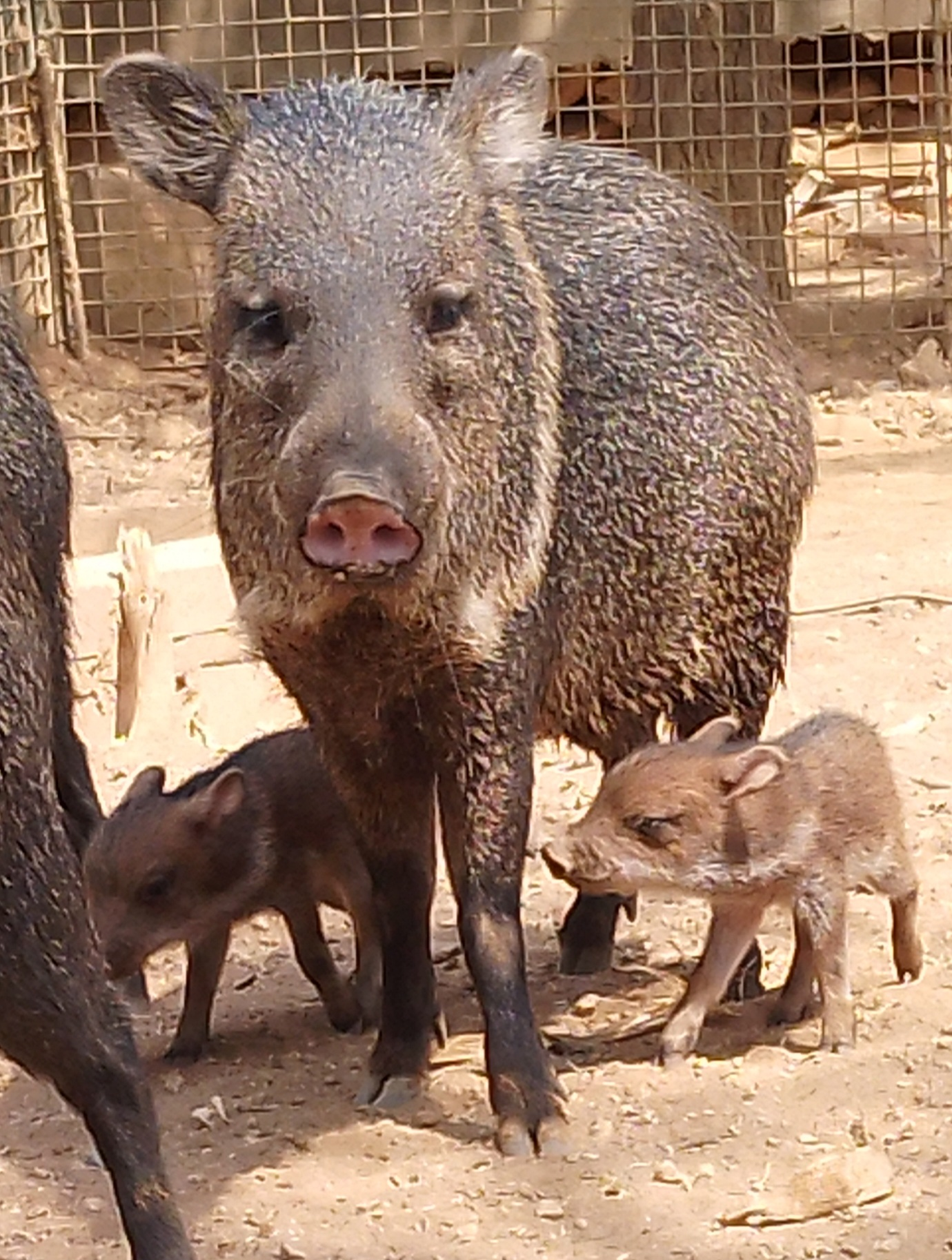
In Zoo Paraguaná, Venezuela.

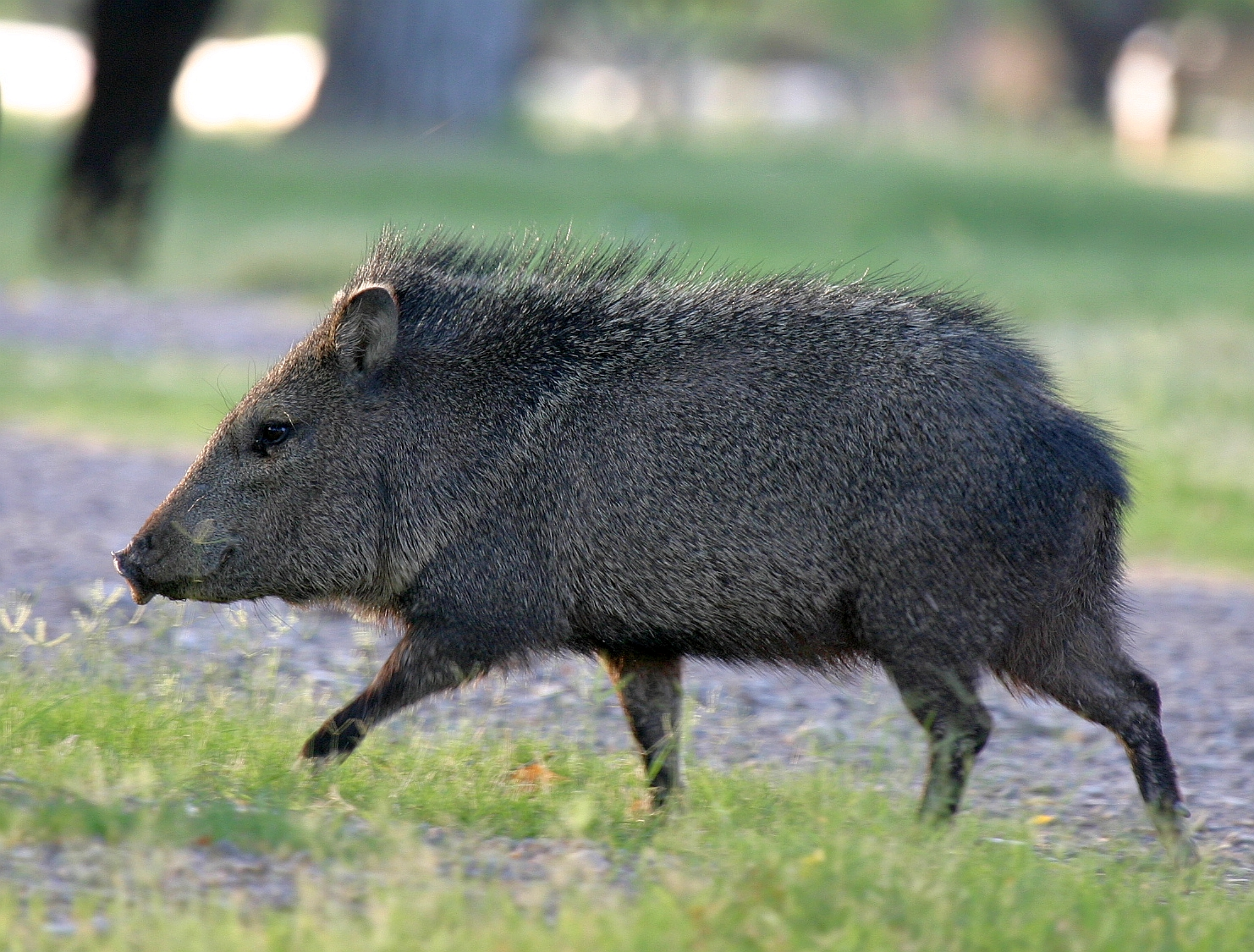
Big Bend National Park, West Texas

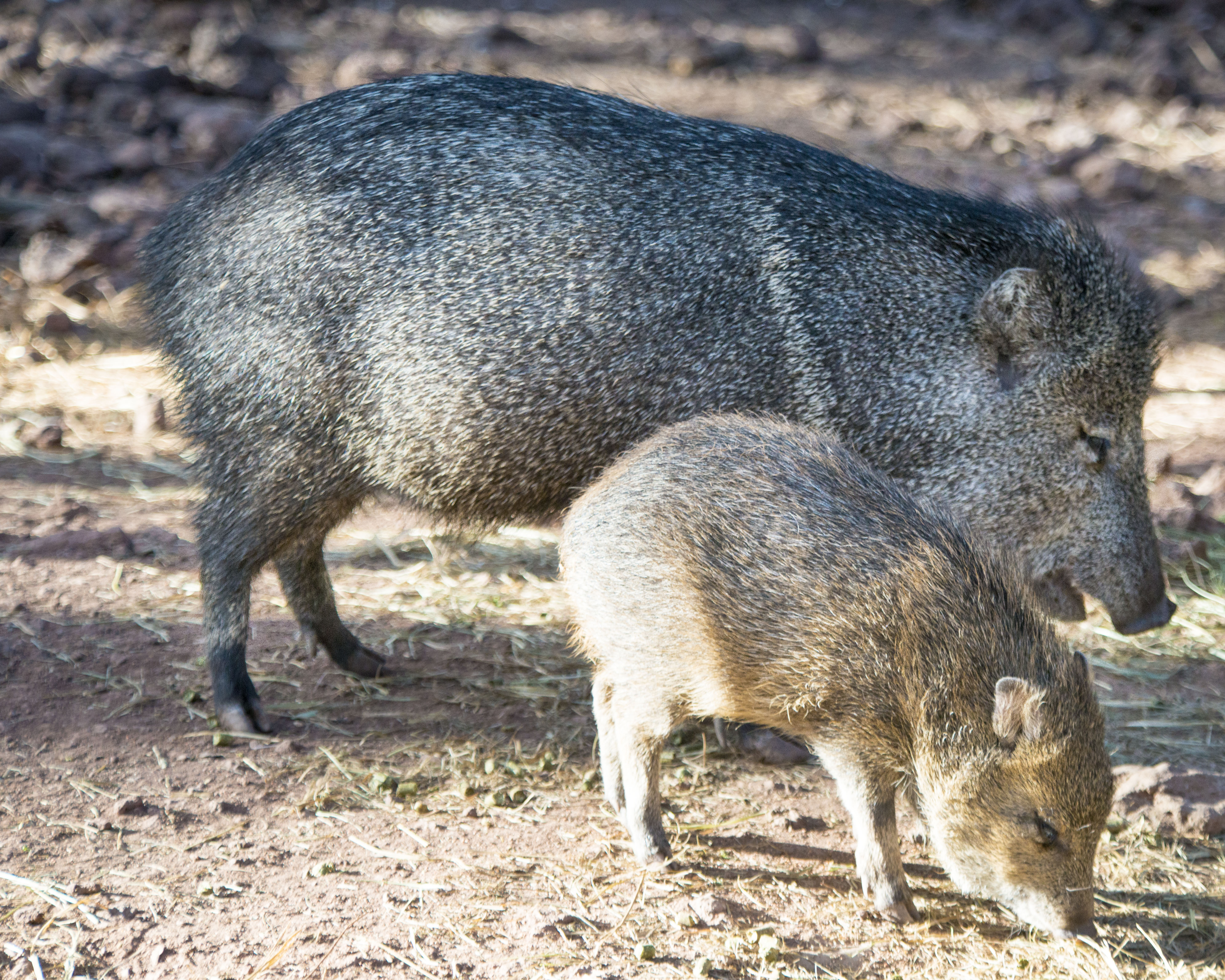
Mother and juvenile in Arizona

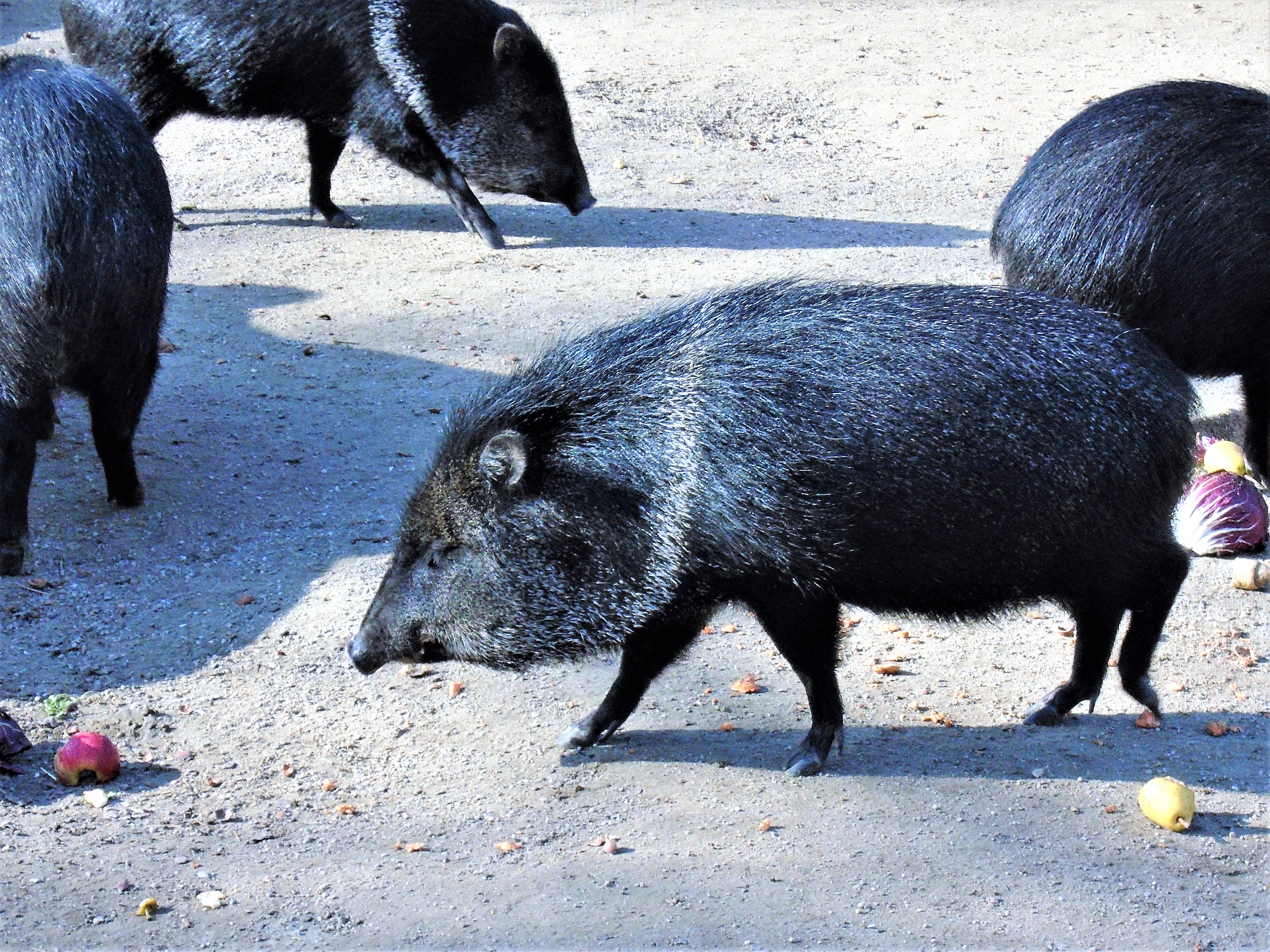
Collared peccaries in Zagreb Zoo, Croatia

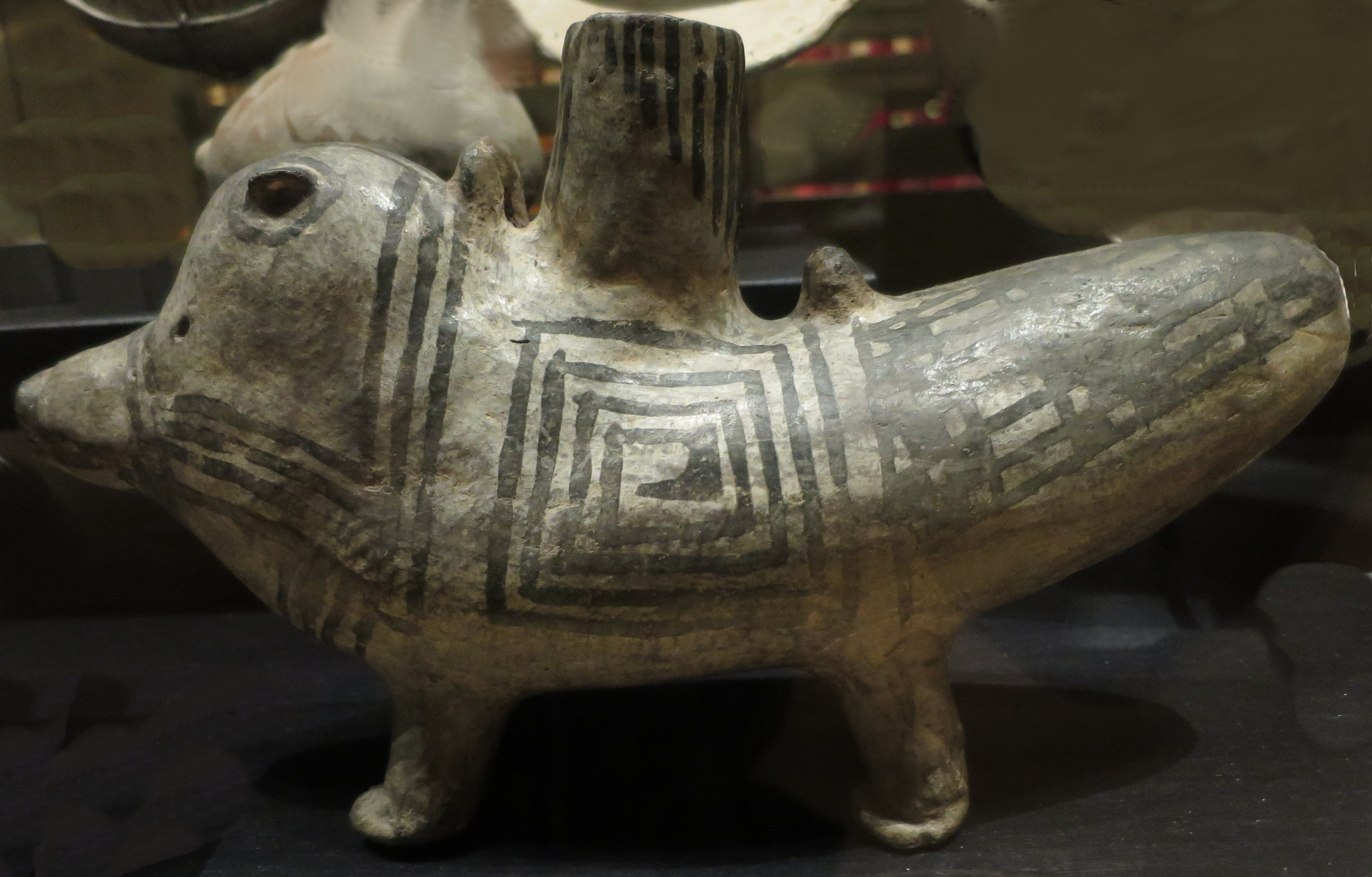
A Pueblo drinking vessel

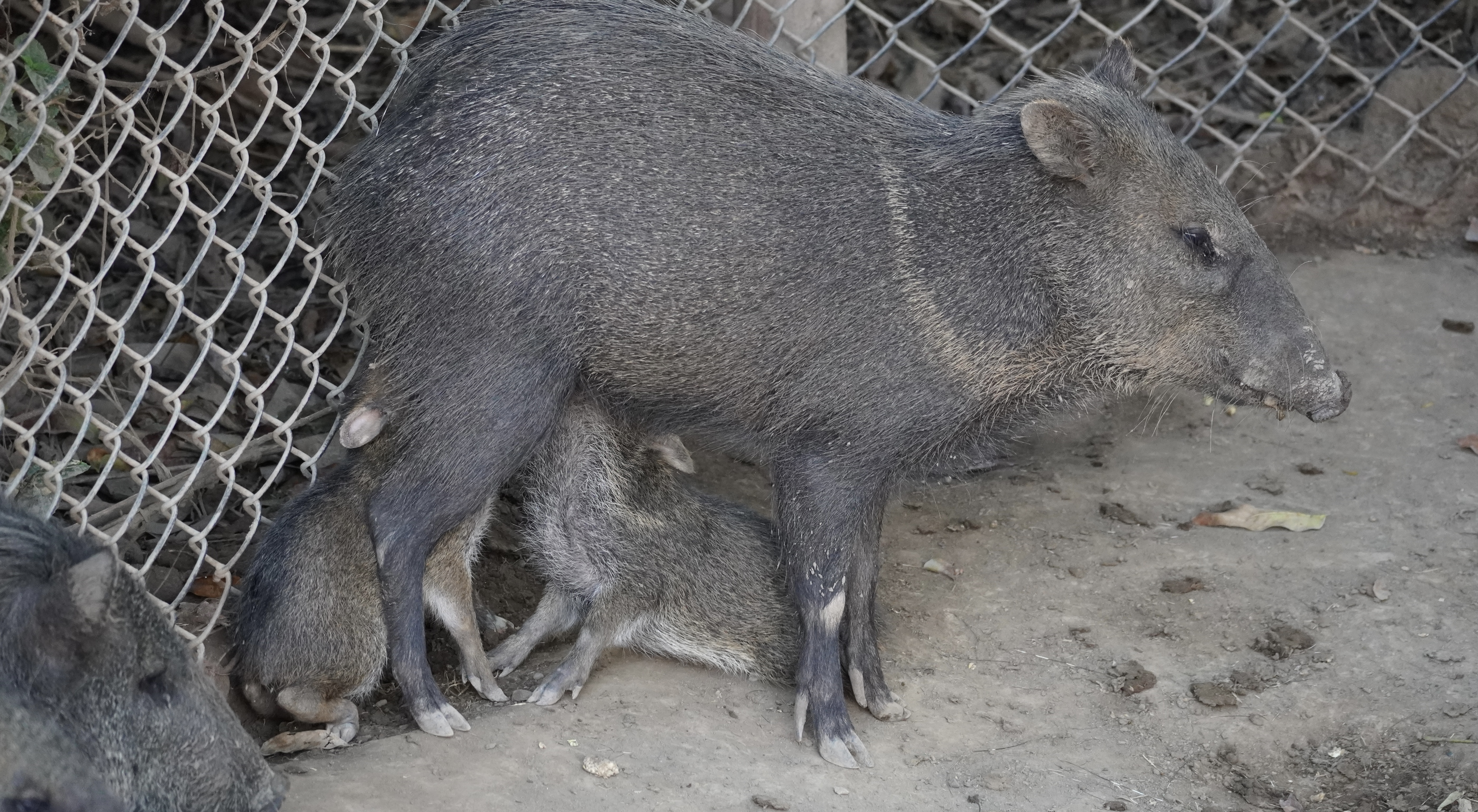
Female nursing its young in the Parque de las Leyendas
