= Arara (Rondônia) =

Total population
- 200 (1990s)

Regions with significant populations
- Rondônia

Languages
- Karo

Religion
- Baptist

Related ethnic groups
- Zoró and Gavião

The Arara are an Indigenous people of Brazil native to the state of Rondônia. They are closely related to the Zoró and Gavião peoples, and are distinct from other groups known as "Arara" to outsiders, including the Arara of Pará and the Kwaza.

The Arara were an uncontacted tribe until the 1950s. At the time, they were at war with the neighboring Gavião. Through the Gavião, the Brazilian government contacted the Arara and enforced a peace. Their numbers declined rapidly after contact; only 50 were alive in 1966. The New Tribes Mission introduced medical care, and the population rose to over 200 by the 1990s. The Mission formally converted most Arara to the Baptist faith, though the community largely retained their traditional beliefs.
