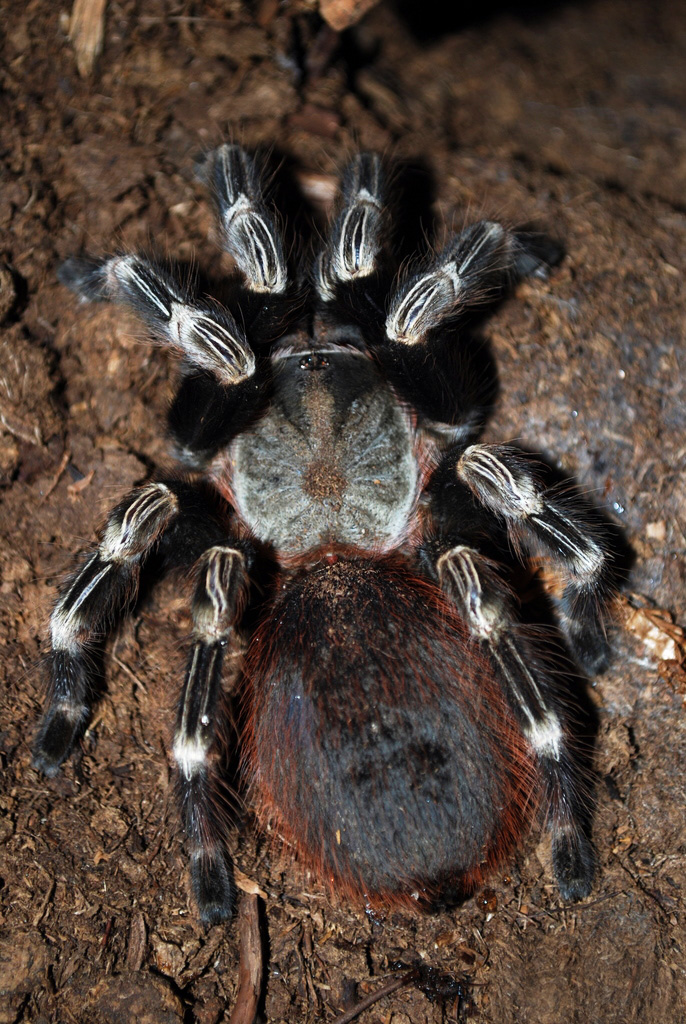

Scientific classification
- Kingdom: Animalia
- Phylum: Arthropoda
- Subphylum: Chelicerata
- Class: Arachnida
- Order: Araneae
- Infraorder: Mygalomorphae
- Family: Theraphosidae
- Genus: Nhandu
- Species: N. chromatus

Binomial name
- Nhandu chromatus Schmidt, 2004

Synonyms
- Vitalius chromatus (Schmidt, 2004)

= Brazilian red and white tarantula =

Species of spider

The Brazilian red and white tarantula (Nhandu chromatus) is a tarantula species that is native to Brazil.

== Description ==
The Brazilian red and white tarantula (Nhandu chromatus) is a larger tarantula with a diagonal leg span of approximately 15–17 centimetres (5.9–6.7 in). The Brazilian red and white tarantula is noted for its white striped legs, beige to grey prosoma, and the reddish hairs on the opisthosoma. Males and females look the same until the ultimate (final) molt of the males. At this point the male will exhibit sexual dimorphism in the form of a duller coloration and legginess. Additionally males will gain an embolus on the pedipalps and tibial apophysis (mating hooks). The Brazilian red and white tarantula is a terrestrial species that will often make a burrow or make use of an abandoned burrow. The Brazilian red and white tarantula is reputed to be quite defensive with its urticating hairs.

== Taxonomy ==
The species was first described by Günter Schmidt in 2004. It was transferred to the genus Vitalius by Rogério Bertani in 2023, but transferred back to Nhandu in 2026. It has been treated as Vitalius cristatus, but this was based on misidentifications.

== Habitat ==
The Brazilian red and white tarantula is native to Brazil, where it is found in tropical forests and savannahs.

== Pet trade ==
The Brazilian red and white tarantula is now fairly common in the pet trade, and it is popular among tarantula keepers for its beautiful coloration. The Brazilian red and white tarantulas large size, skittish demeanor, and urticating hairs means that it should not be handled except by an experienced person.
