= August Langhoffer =

Croatian entomologist (1861–1940)

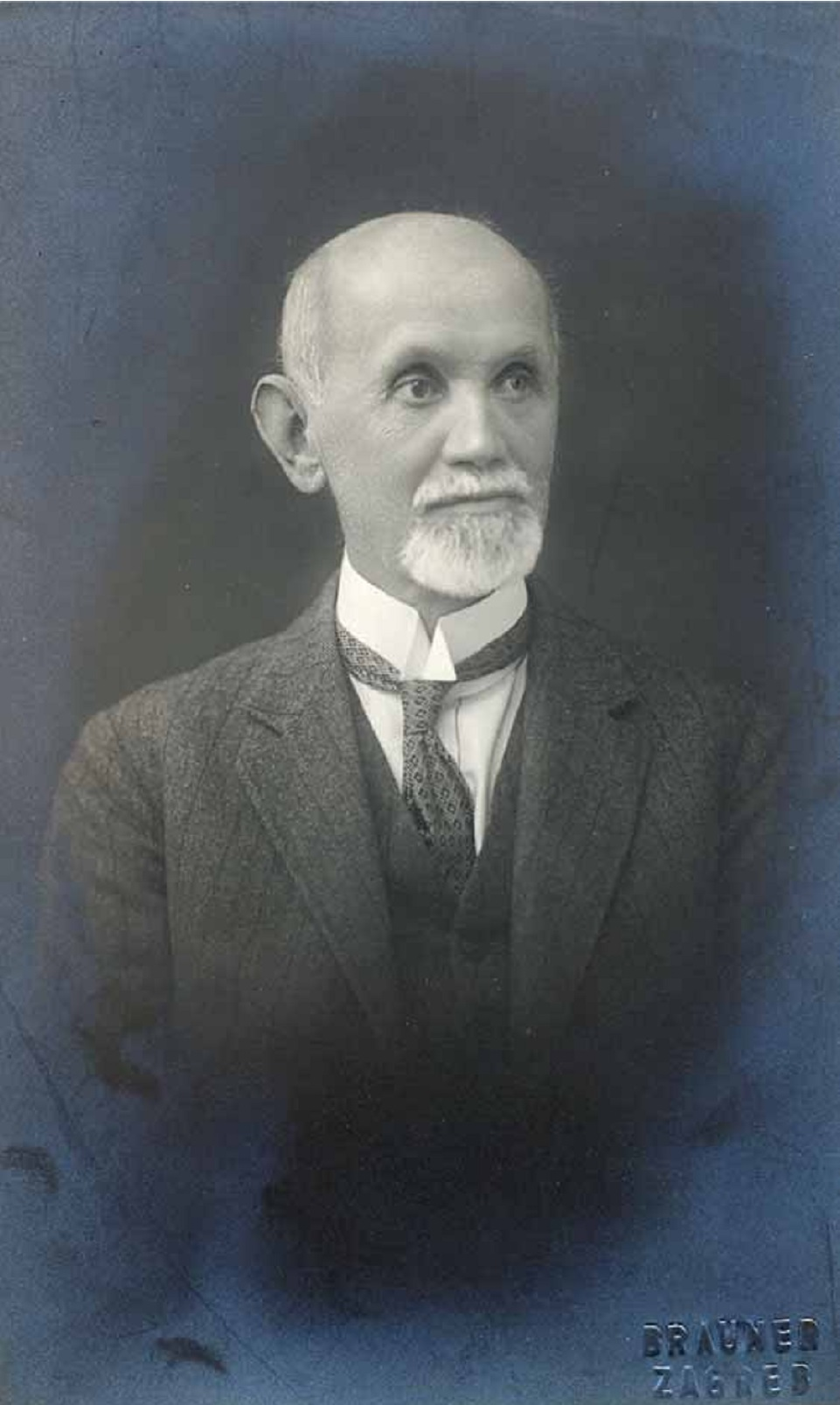

August Langhoffer (17 April 1861 – 29 April 1940) was a Croatian entomologist and a professor of zoology at the University of Zagreb. The blind cave beetle Anophthalmus langhofferi is named after him.

Langhoffer was born in Kysáč, at the time in the Habsburg monarchy, to teaching parents Johann Tobias and Emilia née Reuss. He was educated at gymnasiums in Novi Sad and Osijek, and lived in Sarvaš before he went to the University of Zagreb (1879-1883) and University of Jena (1883-84). He received a doctorate in 1888 from Jena for his dissertation Beiträge zur Kenntnis der Mundteile der Dipteren (lit. 'Contributions to the Knowledge of the Mouthparts of Diptera'). He taught in various schools including the Nautical School in Buccari and in 1895 become a professor of zoology at the University of Zagreb and headed the Zoological Museum. He published on the mouthparts of Diptera, Hymenoptera, the systematics of bark beetles, and on cave beetles. He retired in 1927 and died at Zagreb.
