= Monde languages =

Tupian language branch of Brazil

Monde
- Geographic distribution: Brazil
- Linguistic classification: Tupian: Monde
- Subdivisions: Surui; Gavianic

Language codes
- Glottolog: mond1266

The Monde languages of Brazil form a branch of the Tupian language family.

Cinta Larga is a dialect cluster spoken by a thousand people. Other languages are Mondé, Aruáshi, Suruí, Zoro, and Gavião do Jiparaná.

== Classification ==
Kabanae (spoken by the "Arara nation" according to Johann Natterer) and Matanau, are both extinct and very similar Monde languages that were spoken at the mouth of the Aripuanã River. Word lists of Kabanae and Matanau were collected by Johann Natterer in 1829 during his expedition into the Madeira River (Jolkesky 2016: 640-641).

Jolkesky (2016) also observed some similarities between the Arara do Rio Branco and the Monde languages; however, Arara do Rio Branco remains unclassified.

=== Moore (2005) ===
Internal classification of the Mondé languages according to Moore (2005):

- Mondé
  - Suruí (Paíter)
    - Salamãy (Mondé)
      - Cinta Larga (3 groups: Kabínééy, Kakínééy, and Maamééy)
        - Gavião de Rondônia (Ikolééy)
        - Zoró (Pãgɨñééy)
        - Aruá

Unclassified: Arara do Guariba

=== Loukotka (1968) ===
Below is a list of Mondé language varieties listed by Loukotka (1968), including names of unattested varieties.

- Mondé - spoken on the Ouro River, tributary of the Pimenta Bueno River, Rondônia.
- Sanamaica / Salamay - spoken on the left bank of the Pimenta Bueno River.
- Aruá - spoken on the Branco River near São Luís, Rondônia.
- Digüt - spoken on the left bank of the Machado River.
- Aruáshi - spoken by the neighbors of the Tupari tribe at the sources of the Branco River.
