= Surui language =

Tupian language spoken in Brazil

Suruí
- Paíter
- Pronunciation: [pa.iˈte:ɾ̥]
- Native to: Brazil
- Region: Rondônia, Mato Grosso
- Ethnicity: Paiter
- Native speakers: 1,000 (2006)
- Language family: Tupian: Monde; Suruí

Language codes
- ISO 639-3: sru
- Glottolog: suru1262
- ELP: Paiter
- Linguasphere: 88-EAB-ad

Suruí (of Jiparaná), also known as Paíter or Suruí-Paíter, is a Tupian language of Brazil. The Suruí of Rondônia call themselves Paiter, which means “the true people, we ourselves". They speak a language of the Tupi group and Monde language family. There were 1,375 Suruí-Paíter in 2014.

== Phonology ==
=== Vowels ===
	Oral			Nasal		
	Front	Central	Back	Front	Central	Back
Close	i iː	ɨ ɨː		ĩ ĩː	ɨ̃ ɨ̃ː	
Mid	e eː		o oː	ẽ ẽː		õ õː
Open		a aː			ã ãː	

=== Consonants ===
		Labial	Alveolar	Palatal	Velar	Glottal
Stop	voiceless	p	t	tʃ	k	
Stop	voiced	b	d	(dʒ)	ɡ	
Nasal		m	n	ɲ	ŋ	
Fricative		β	s	ʃ		h
Tap			ɾ			
Approximant			l	j	(w)	

- /β/ can be heard as either [β] or [w] in free variation, and as [ɸ] when before voiceless consonants.
- /b/ can be heard as prenasal [ᵐb] when after a nasal vowel, or when in initial position.
- /h/ can be heard as voiced [ɦ] when between vowels. It is also said to be heard as a voiceless lateral [l̥], among elder speakers.
- /j/ can be heard as nasal [j̃] when preceding or in between nasal vowels.
- Sounds /p, t, k, m, n, ŋ/, can be heard as [p̚, t̚, k̚, m̚, n̚, ŋ̚] in word-final position.
