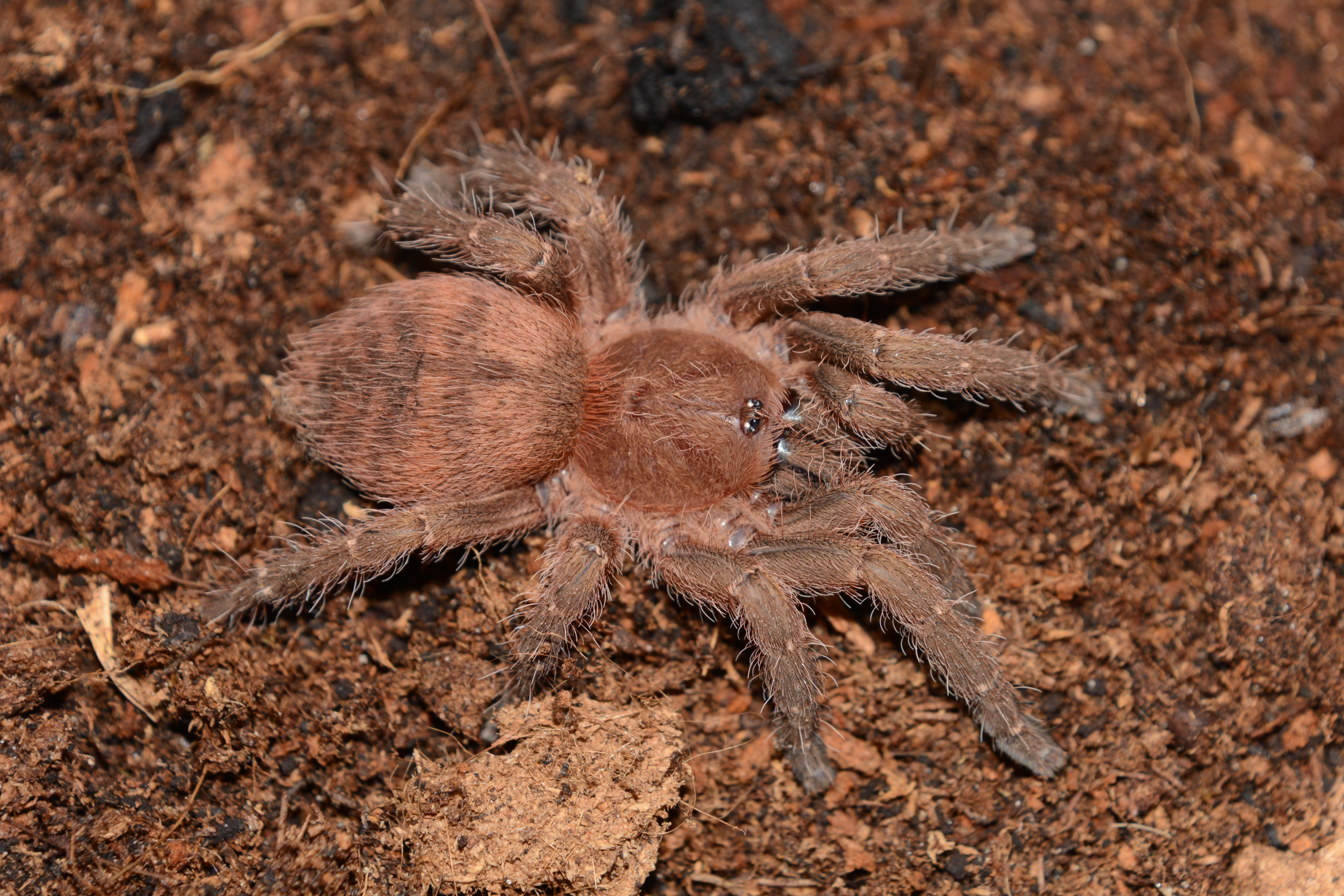
- Neischnocolus iquitos

Scientific classification
- Kingdom: Animalia
- Phylum: Arthropoda
- Subphylum: Chelicerata
- Class: Arachnida
- Order: Araneae
- Infraorder: Mygalomorphae
- Family: Theraphosidae
- Genus: Neischnocolus; Petrunkevitch, 1925

Species
- See text.

Synonyms
- Ami Pérez-Miles, 2008; Barropelma Chamberlin, 1940

= Neischnocolus =

Genus of spiders

Neischnocolus is a genus of spiders in the family Theraphosidae. It was first described in 1925 by Petrunkevitch. The genus Ami was separately described in 2008, but was later discovered to be a junior synonym of Neischnocolus. Species are native to Central America and northern South America.

== Description ==
The carapace (upper surface of the cephalothorax) is light to dark brown and hairy. The legs are also hairy, with spines except on the femora. There are no stridulatory bristles. Neischnocolus species have modified Type I urticating hairs on the abdomen, similar to those of Proshapalopus and Citharacanthus livingstoni. Males differ from other theraphosids in having one or two more-or-less conical processes on the rear-facing (retrolateral) surface of the tibia of the pedipalp; the pear-shaped palpal bulb is also different from other theraphosids, having somewhat convergent "keels" on the forward-facing (prolateral) surface. Females have very distinctive spermathecae, with paired receptacles attached to a "back-plate".

The body lengths of the species range from about 17 to 21 mm (0.7 to 0.8 in). Males generally have longer legs than females; for example the longest leg (the fourth) of a female N. caxiuana was 21 mm (0.8 in) long and that of a male 40 mm (1.6 in) long.

== Taxonomy ==
The genus Ami was erected in 2008 by Fernando Pérez-Miles; the name is based on a word in the Tupí language, meaning "spider that does not spin a web". Initially six new species were placed in the genus, and Avicularia obscura was transferred to it. Ami seemed to be more closely related to the genus Proshapalopus than to other genera of the large subfamily Theraphosinae. It is also similar to the small brownish genera Cyclosternum and Reversopelma.

The six new species were A. caxiuana, named after the type locality, which means "place of many snakes" in Tupí; A. yupanquii, named after the Inca leader Tupac Yupanqui, who unified the agricultural populations of Ecuador; A. bladesi named in honor of Panamanian singer and composer Ruben Blades; A. pijaos, honoring the Pijaos, an ancient culture that populated the region of the type locality; A. amazonica, referring to the Colombian Amazonic region; and A. weinmanni, named after Dirk Weinmann, the collector of the type specimens.

In 2019, Pérez-Miles and co-workers discovered that Ami bladesi was identical to the earlier described Neischnocolus panamanus Petrunkevitch, 1925, whose holotype had been rediscovered. Accordingly, Ami was considered to be a junior synonym of Neischnocolus, and all the species were transferred to that genus. Other species have since been added to the genus, including three in 2025.

=== Species ===
As of October 2025, the World Spider Catalog accepted the following species:

- Neischnocolus amazonica (Jimenez & Bertani, 2008) (syn. Ami amazonica) – Colombia (Note: The specific names amazonica and caxiuana were designated as nouns in apposition in the original description of the species (in the genus Ami, so do not change their endings.)
- Neischnocolus armihuariensis (Kaderka, 2014) (syn. Ami armihuariensis) – Peru
- Neischnocolus caxiuana (Pérez-Miles, Miglio & Bonaldo, 2008) (syn. Ami caxiuana) – Brazil
- Neischnocolus cisnerosi Peñaherrera-R., Guerrero-Campoverde, León-E., Pinos-Sánchez & Falcón-Reibán, 2023 – Ecuador
- Neischnocolus iquitos Kaderka, 2020 – Peru
- Neischnocolus mecana Echeverri, Gómez Torres, Pinel & Perafán, 2023 – Colombia
- Neischnocolus moraspungo Cisneros-Heredia, Peñaherrera-R., Guerrero-Campoverde, León-E. & Gabriel & Sherwood, 2025 – Ecuador
- Neischnocolus panamanus Petrunkevitch, 1925 (type species) (syn. Ami bladesi) – Costa Rica, Panama
- Neischnocolus parvior (Chamberlin & Ivie, 1936) (syn. Barropelma parvior) – Panama
- Neischnocolus pijaos (Jimenez & Bertani, 2008) (syn. Ami pijaos) – Colombia
- Neischnocolus samonellaacademy Peñaherrera-R., León-E., Guerrero-Campoverde, Gabriel, Sherwood & Cisneros-Heredia, 2025 – Ecuador
- Neischnocolus tiputini Guerrero-Campoverde, Peñaherrera-R., León-E., Gabriel, Sherwood & Cisneros-Heredia, 2025 – Ecuador
- Neischnocolus tsere Peñaherrera-R., Guerrero-Campoverde, León-E., Pinos-Sánchez & Falcón-Reibán, 2023 – Ecuador
- Neischnocolus valentinae (Almeida, Salvatierra & de Morais, 2019) (syn. Ami valentinae) – Brazil
- Neischnocolus weinmanni (Pérez-Miles, 2008) (syn. Ami weinmanni) – Venezuela
- Neischnocolus yupanquii (Pérez-Miles, Gabriel & Gallon, 2008) (syn. Ami yupanquii) – Ecuador
