= Tmesiphantes mutquina =

Scientific classification
- Kingdom: Animalia
- Phylum: Arthropoda
- Subphylum: Chelicerata
- Class: Arachnida
- Order: Araneae
- Infraorder: Mygalomorphae
- Family: Theraphosidae
- Genus: Tmesiphantes
- Species: T. mutquina

Binomial name
- Tmesiphantes mutquina (Perafán & Pérez-Miles, 2014)

Synonyms
- Melloleitaoina mutquina Perafán & Pérez-Miles, 2014

Species of spider

Tmesiphantes mutquina is a species of theraphosid spider in the subfamily Theraphosinae. It is native to Argentina.

== Taxonomy ==
The species was first described in 2014 as Melloleitaoina mutquina. The specific name matquina comes from the Quechua language, meaning "a place or thing to smell", and is the name of the type locality, Mutquín. When it rains there, herbs release a pleasant smell. In 2019, it was transferred to the genus Tmesiphantes.

== Characteristics ==
Tmesiphantes mutquina is only known from the male, which has a relatively straight embolus lacking any subapical triangular spine.
