= Stenotarsus sicarius =

Scientific classification
- Kingdom: Animalia
- Phylum: Arthropoda
- Class: Insecta
- Order: Coleoptera
- Suborder: Polyphaga
- Infraorder: Cucujiformia
- Family: Endomychidae
- Genus: Stenotarsus
- Species: S. sicarius

Binomial name
- Stenotarsus sicarius Gorham, 1886

Species of beetle

Stenotarsus sicarius, is a species of handsome fungus beetle found in Sri Lanka.

== Description ==
Typical length is about 3 mm. Body strongly convex, and pubescent. Entirely black in color. Elytral base is wider, and distinctively striped-dotted. Thoracic margin less elevated. Elytra suddenly widening from the shoulder. Antennae reddish, where the second to eighth joints are short and bead-shaped. Thorax wider than long, and narrowed to the front angles. Pronotal disk is convex, and puncturing by coarse floccose pubescence.
