= Tmesiphantes yupanqui =

Scientific classification
- Kingdom: Animalia
- Phylum: Arthropoda
- Subphylum: Chelicerata
- Class: Arachnida
- Order: Araneae
- Infraorder: Mygalomorphae
- Family: Theraphosidae
- Genus: Tmesiphantes
- Species: T. yupanqui

Binomial name
- Tmesiphantes yupanqui (Perafán & Pérez-Miles, 2014)

Synonyms
- Melloleitaoina yupanqui Perafán & Pérez-Miles, 2014

Species of spider

Tmesiphantes yupanqui is a species of spider in the subfamily Theraphosinae of the family Theraphosidae. It is endemic to Argentina.

== Taxonomy ==
The species was first described in 2014 as Melloleitaoina yupanqui. The specific name yupanqui is in honour of Atahualpa Yupanqui, a famous musician and a synonym of Héctor Aramburu. In 2019, it was transferred to the genus Tmesiphantes.

== Characteristics ==
Tmesiphantes yupanqui has a very curved embolus with no triangular spine, and a discontinued prolateral superior keel (still on the embolus) which separates into two keels. The female spermathecae are short and with large granules.
