= Munduruku (disambiguation) =

The Munduruku are an indigenous people of Brazil.

Munduruku may also refer to:

- Munduruku language
- Munduruku bicoloratum, a tarantula species
