= Bistriopelma lamasi =

Scientific classification
- Kingdom: Animalia
- Phylum: Arthropoda
- Subphylum: Chelicerata
- Class: Arachnida
- Order: Araneae
- Infraorder: Mygalomorphae
- Family: Theraphosidae
- Genus: Bistriopelma
- Species: B. lamasi

Binomial name
- Bistriopelma lamasi Kaderka, 2015

Species of spider

Bistriopelma lamasi is a species of theraphosine tarantula, which is native to Peru.

== Etymology ==
The specific name lamasi is in honour of Gerardo Lamas Müller, who specialized in butterflies and collected the types.

== Characteristic features ==
B. lamasi has a deep fovea and the spermathecae have large granules, and has a well developed basal tubercle.
