= Bistriopelma =

Scientific classification
- Kingdom: Animalia
- Phylum: Arthropoda
- Subphylum: Chelicerata
- Class: Arachnida
- Order: Araneae
- Infraorder: Mygalomorphae
- Family: Theraphosidae
- Genus: Bistriopelma; Kaderka, 2015

Type species
- Bistriopelma lamasi Kaderka, 2015

Species
- 6, see text

Genus of spiders

Bistriopelma is a genus of spider, being a theraphosine theraphosid (tarantula).

== Etymology ==
The generic name Bistriopelma comes from the Latin bi- meaning "two" and strio meaning "stripe". This refers to the dorsolateral urticating patches of which there are two, both of which have a stripe of thick hair.

== Characteristics ==
Bistriopelma has two distinctive patches of Type III urticating setae, which are located dorsolaterally on the abdomen, each with a long stripe of thicker setae, which runs diagonally to the longitudinal body axis. The female spermathecae are nearly parallel, and the male's embolus curves retrolaterally from the tegulum (base).

== Species ==
As of May 2022 it contains six species, found in Peru:

- Bistriopelma fabianae Quispe-Colca & Kaderka, 2020 – Peru
- Bistriopelma kiwicha Nicoletta, Chaparro, Mamani, Ochoa, West & Ferretti, 2020 – Peru
- Bistriopelma lamasi Kaderka, 2015 – Peru
- Bistriopelma matuskai Kaderka, 2015 – Peru
- Bistriopelma peyoi Nicoletta, Chaparro, Mamani, Ochoa, West & Ferretti, 2020 – Peru
- Bistriopelma titicaca Kaderka, 2017 – Peru
