= Stenotarsus vallatus =

Scientific classification
- Kingdom: Animalia
- Phylum: Arthropoda
- Class: Insecta
- Order: Coleoptera
- Suborder: Polyphaga
- Infraorder: Cucujiformia
- Family: Endomychidae
- Genus: Stenotarsus
- Species: S. vallatus

Binomial name
- Stenotarsus vallatus Gerstaecker, 1858

Species of beetle

Stenotarsus vallatus, is a species of handsome fungus beetle found in India and Sri Lanka.

== Description ==
Antenna reddish, and gradually thickened. The series of punctures are more regular and fine.
