= Hapalotremus martinorum =

Scientific classification
- Kingdom: Animalia
- Phylum: Arthropoda
- Subphylum: Chelicerata
- Class: Arachnida
- Order: Araneae
- Infraorder: Mygalomorphae
- Family: Theraphosidae
- Genus: Hapalotremus
- Species: H. martinorum

Binomial name
- Hapalotremus martinorum Cavallo & Ferretti, 2015

Species of spider

Hapalotremus martinorum is a species of tarantula in the subfamily Theraphosinae native to the High Yungas of Salta province, Argentina. It was first described in a 2015 publication by Patricio E. Cavallo and Nelson Ferretti.

== Characteristics ==
Hapalotremus martinorum differs from all other congeners by the colour pattern of live specimens. Males differ in the male palpal bulb morphology, with thickened and less curved embolus having a blunt sub-apical keel and less-developed apical keel. Females differ in the shape of the spermathecae, with the lateral bases more pronounced than the superiors and the upper edge more rounded. Specimens inhabit short burrows or crevices under stones in high cloud forests.
