= Hapalotremus major =

Scientific classification
- Kingdom: Animalia
- Phylum: Arthropoda
- Subphylum: Chelicerata
- Class: Arachnida
- Order: Araneae
- Infraorder: Mygalomorphae
- Family: Theraphosidae
- Genus: Hapalotremus
- Species: H. major

Binomial name
- Hapalotremus major (Chamberlin, 1916)

Species of spider

Hapalotremus major is a species of tarantula, in the subfamily Theraphosinae. It is native to Peru.

== Taxonomy ==
Ralph Vary Chamberlin originally described this species as Hemirrhagus major, but it was later transferred to Hapalotremus by Fernando Pérez-Miles & Arturo Locht.

== Characteristics ==
Hapalotremus major differs from all other species of Hapalotremus by a thinner and more curved embolus, and also its size, which is proportionately large (29 mm).
