= Homoeomma elegans =

Scientific classification
- Kingdom: Animalia
- Phylum: Arthropoda
- Subphylum: Chelicerata
- Class: Arachnida
- Order: Araneae
- Infraorder: Mygalomorphae
- Family: Theraphosidae
- Genus: Homoeomma
- Species: H. elegans

Binomial name
- Homoeomma elegans (Gerschman & Schiapelli, 1958)

Synonyms
- Tmesiphantes elegans Gerschman & Schiapelli, 1958

Species of spider

Homoeomma elegans is a species of spiders in the family Theraphosidae. It is found in Argentina.
