= M. robustum =

M. robustum may refer to:

- Megaphobema robustum, the Colombian giant tarantula or Colombian giant redleg, a spider species found in the tropical rainforests of Colombia and Brazil
- Moxostoma robustum, the robust redhorse or smallfin redhorse, a freshwater fish species of the eastern United States
