= Tmesiphantes aridai =

Scientific classification
- Kingdom: Animalia
- Phylum: Arthropoda
- Subphylum: Chelicerata
- Class: Arachnida
- Order: Araneae
- Infraorder: Mygalomorphae
- Family: Theraphosidae
- Genus: Tmesiphantes
- Species: T. aridai

Binomial name
- Tmesiphantes aridai Gonzalez-Filho, Brescovit, Lucas, 2014

Species of spider

Tmesiphantes aridai is a species of tarantula in the family Theraphosidae, subfamily Theraphosinae. The type locality is Floresta Nacional do Tapajós, Santarém, in the state of Pará, Brazil.

== Taxonomy ==
The species was first described by Hector Gonzalez-Filho, Antonio Brescovit and Sylvia Lucas in 2014. The specific name aridai honors Filepe Arida, the grandson of one of the describers.

== Description ==
The male is distinguished from other species by an inconspicuous basal tegular projection on the palps and a tibial apophysis (i.e. a projection) with two similarly sized branches, and the retrolateral one is large and has an apical spine.

The female is identified by the spermathecae; these have inconspicuous constriction on the apex, also the shape of the apex is irregular. Urticating hairs are present in both genders.
