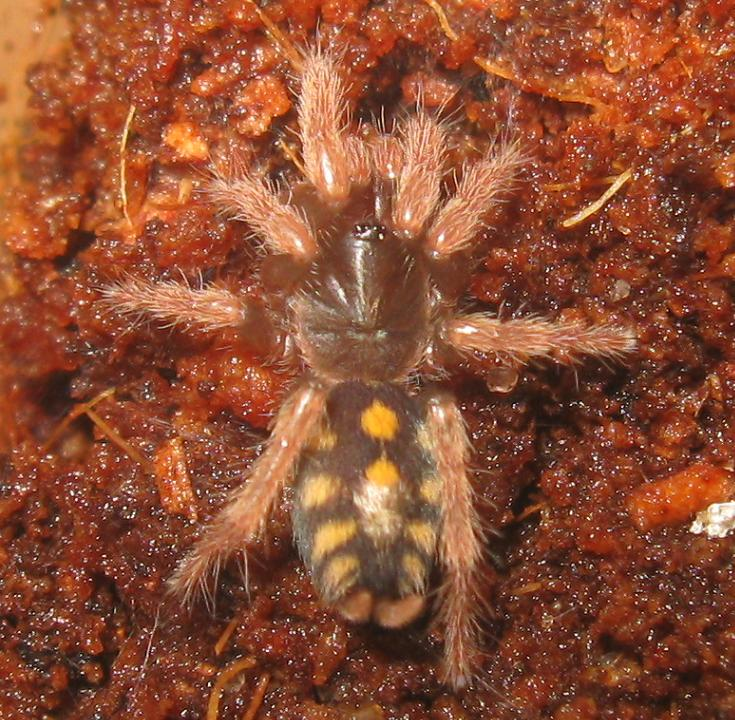
- Hapalopus triseriatus

Scientific classification
- Kingdom: Animalia
- Phylum: Arthropoda
- Subphylum: Chelicerata
- Class: Arachnida
- Order: Araneae
- Infraorder: Mygalomorphae
- Family: Theraphosidae
- Genus: Hapalopus; Ausserer, 1875

Type species
- H. formosus Ausserer, 1875

Species
- 8, see text

= Hapalopus =

Genus of spiders

Hapalopus is a genus of tarantulas that was first described by Anton Ausserer in 1875.

== Diagnosis ==
They own a ring like keel on the palpal bulb, the tibial apophysis with convergent branches and a spermatheca having a membrane like base. They also lack stridulatory hairs and they own numerous labial cuspules. Specimens are further differentiated from the closely-related Notahapalopus genus by a single round spermathecal receptacle, which is Y-shaped in Notahapalopus.

== Species ==
As of November 2025 it contains 8 species, found in South America and Panama:

- Hapalopus coloratus Valerio, 1982 - Panama
- Hapalopus formosus Ausserer, 1875 (type) - Colombia
- Hapalopus guerreroi Sherwood, Gabriel, Peñaherrera-R., Osorio, Benavides, Hörweg, Brescovit & Lucas, 2024 - Colombia
- Hapalopus nigriventris Mello-Leitão, 1939 - Venezuela
- Hapalopus planetearth Dupérré & Tapia, 2025 - Ecuador
- Hapalopus platnicki Sherwood, Gabriel, Peñaherrera-R., Osorio, Benavides, Hörweg, Brescovit & Lucas, 2024 - Colombia
- Hapalopus triseriatus Caporiacco, 1955 - Venezuela
- Hapalopus vangoghi Sherwood, Gabriel, Peñaherrera-R., Osorio, Benavides, Hörweg, Brescovit & Lucas, 2024 - Colombia

=== In synonymy ===
- H. magdalena (Karsch, 1879) = Hapalopus formosus Ausserer, 1875
- H. variegatus (Caporiacco, 1955) = Chromatopelma cyaneopubescens Strand, 1907

=== Nomen dubium ===
- Hapalopus limensis Vellard, 1954 – (Though the description by Vellard wasn't published)

=== Transferred to other genera ===
- Hapalopus aldana (West, 2000) → Magnacarina aldana
- Hapalopus aymara (Perdomo, Panzera & Pérez-Miles, 2009) → Notahapalopus aymara
- Hapalopus butantan (Pérez-Miles, 1998) → Jambu butantan
- Hapalopus flavohirtus (Simon, 1889) → Catanduba flavohirta
- Hapalopus gasci (Maréchal, 1996) → Notahapalopus gasci
- Hapalopus guianensis (Caporiacco, 1954) → Neostenotarsus guianensis
- Hapalopus incei (F. O. Pickard-Cambridge, 1898) → Neoholothele incei
- Hapalopus lesleyae (Gabriel, 2011) → Jambu lesleyae
- Hapalopus nondescriptus Mello-Leitão, 1926 → Vitalius nondescriptus
- Hapalopus pentaloris (Simon, 1888) → Davus pentaloris
- Hapalopus pictus Pocock, 1903 → Anqasha picta
- Hapalopus rectimanus Mello-Leitão, 1923 → Plesiopelma rectimanum
- Hapalopus semiaurantiacus (Simon, 1897) → Plesiopelma semiaurantiacum
- Hapalopus serrapelada Fonseca-Ferreira, Zampaulo & Guadanucci, 2017 → Notahapalopus serrapelada
- Hapalopus tripepii (Dresco, 1984) → Nhandu tripepii
- Hapalopus versicolor (Simon, 1897) → Cyriocosmus versicolor
