= Tmesiphantes crassifemur =

Scientific classification
- Kingdom: Animalia
- Phylum: Arthropoda
- Subphylum: Chelicerata
- Class: Arachnida
- Order: Araneae
- Infraorder: Mygalomorphae
- Family: Theraphosidae
- Genus: Tmesiphantes
- Species: T. crassifemur

Binomial name
- Tmesiphantes crassifemur (Gerschman & Schiapelli, 1960)

Synonyms
- Melloleitaoina crassifemur Gerschman & Schiapelli, 1960; Dryptopelma crassifemur (Gerschman & Schiapelli, 1960)

Species of spider

Tmesiphantes crassifemur is a species of theraphosine theraphosid spider. It is native to Argentina.

== Taxonomic history ==
In 1960, Berta Gerschman de Pikelin and Rita Schiapelli described this species as Melloleitaoina crassifemur. In 1993, Gunter Schmidt transferred the species to Dryptopelma, but this was rejected by Fernando Pérez-Miles in 1996. In 2019, the species was transferred to Tmesiphantes.

== Characteristics ==
Tmesiphantes crassifemur is only known from the male. It is characterized by a very curved embolus without any triangular tooth. The prolateral inferior embolar keel is just as long as the prolateral superior and the apex of the embolus is widened.
