= Tmesiphantes uru =

Scientific classification
- Kingdom: Animalia
- Phylum: Arthropoda
- Subphylum: Chelicerata
- Class: Arachnida
- Order: Araneae
- Infraorder: Mygalomorphae
- Family: Theraphosidae
- Genus: Tmesiphantes
- Species: T. uru

Binomial name
- Tmesiphantes uru (Perafán & Pérez-Miles, 2014)

Synonyms
- Melloleitaoina uru Perafán & Pérez-Miles, 2014

Species of spider

Tmesiphantes uru is a species of tarantula in the subfamily Theraphosinae. It is endemic to Argentina.

== Taxonomy ==
The species was first described in 2014 as Melloleitaoina uru. The specific name uru refers to the Incan myth, telling of the princess Inca Uru, who was transformed into a spider by the gods to do endless spinning. In 2019, it was transferred to the genus Tmesiphantes.

== Distinguishing features ==
Tmesiphantes uru has (in males) an obvious triangular tooth on the embolus, which is very curved. The female has elongated spermatheca with small granules. It can grow up to 16 mm and has reddish-brown legs, a brown and golden cephalothorax, and a golden-brown urticating patch on the abdomen.
