= Bistriopelma matuskai =

Scientific classification
- Kingdom: Animalia
- Phylum: Arthropoda
- Subphylum: Chelicerata
- Class: Arachnida
- Order: Araneae
- Infraorder: Mygalomorphae
- Family: Theraphosidae
- Genus: Bistriopelma
- Species: B. matuskai

Binomial name
- Bistriopelma matuskai Kaderka, 2015

Species of spider

Bistriopelma matuskai is a species of tarantula, in the theraphosinae subfamily, which is (as of February 2016) only known from Peru.

== Etymology ==
Bistriopelma matuskai 's specific name is in honour of Ondřej Matuška, the author's brother-in-law, who helped in field research.

== Characteristics ==
B. matuskai has no fovea, and only has fine grains on the spermathecae. It has only an undeveloped basal tubercle.
