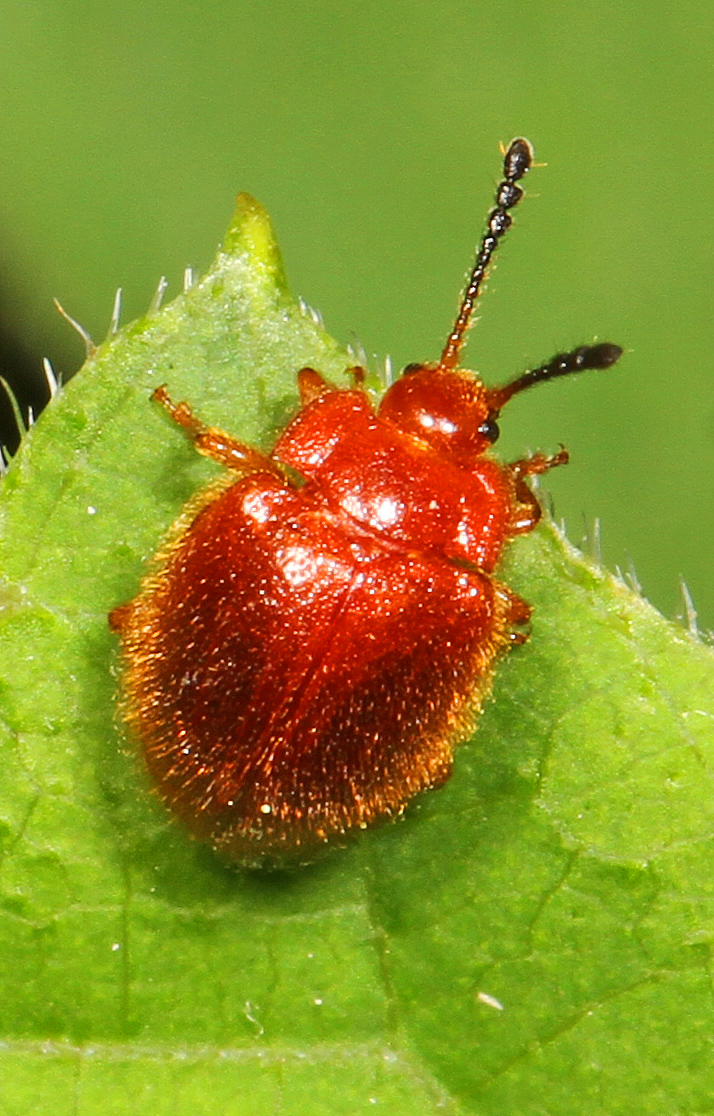

Scientific classification
- Domain: Eukaryota
- Kingdom: Animalia
- Phylum: Arthropoda
- Class: Insecta
- Order: Coleoptera
- Suborder: Polyphaga
- Infraorder: Cucujiformia
- Family: Endomychidae
- Genus: Stenotarsus
- Species: S. blatchleyi

Binomial name
- Stenotarsus blatchleyi Walton, 1928

= Stenotarsus blatchleyi =

Species of beetle

Stenotarsus blatchleyi is a species of handsome fungus beetle in the family Endomychidae. It is found in North America.
