= Schizopelma bicarinatum =

Scientific classification
- Kingdom: Animalia
- Phylum: Arthropoda
- Subphylum: Chelicerata
- Class: Arachnida
- Order: Araneae
- Infraorder: Mygalomorphae
- Family: Theraphosidae
- Genus: Schizopelma
- Species: S. bicarinatum

Binomial name
- Schizopelma bicarinatum F. O. Pickard-Cambridge, 1897

South American tarantula species

Schizopelma bicarinatum is a species of the tarantula found in Mexico in the state of Guerrero in the area of Xautipa (now Chautipan). This tarantula was first described from the collections made by Frederick DuCane Godman and Osbert Salvin by Frederick Octavius Pickard-Cambridge in 1897.

== Description ==
The abdomen has some reddish orange hairs, the legs show blue iridescent color up to the tibia, where it becomes a pinkish copper color. The cephalothorax is iridescent copper pinkish. Females are slightly larger at 1.3 inches (3.5cm) than males which are about an 1 inch (2.3cm).
