= Tmesiphantes =

Scientific classification
- Kingdom: Animalia
- Phylum: Arthropoda
- Subphylum: Chelicerata
- Class: Arachnida
- Order: Araneae
- Infraorder: Mygalomorphae
- Family: Theraphosidae
- Subfamily: Theraphosinae
- Genus: Tmesiphantes; Simon, 1892

Type species
- T. nubilus Simon, 1892

Species
- See text.

Synonyms
- Magulla Simon, 1892; Melloleitaoina Gerschman & Schiapelli, 1960

Genus of spiders

Tmesiphantes is a genus of Brazilian tarantulas in the subfamily Theraphosinae that was first described by Eugène Louis Simon in 1892. The genera Magulla and Melloleitaoina were brought into synonymy in 2019.

== Species ==
As of August 2022 it contains 22 species, found in Brazil and Argentina:

- Tmesiphantes amadoi Yamamoto, Lucas, Guadanucci & Indicatti, 2007 - Brazil
- Tmesiphantes amazonicus Fabiano-da-Silva, Guadanucci & DaSilva, 2019 - Brazil
- Tmesiphantes aridai Gonzalez-Filho, Brescovit & Lucas, 2014 - Brazil
- Tmesiphantes bethaniae Yamamoto, Lucas, Guadanucci & Indicatti, 2007 - Brazil
- Tmesiphantes brescoviti (Indicatti, Lucas, Guadanucci & Yamamoto, 2008) - Brazil
- Tmesiphantes buecherli (Indicatti, Lucas, Guadanucci & Yamamoto, 2008) - Brazil
- Tmesiphantes caymmii Yamamoto, Lucas, Guadanucci & Indicatti, 2007 - Brazil
- Tmesiphantes crassifemur (Gerschman & Schiapelli, 1960) - Argentina
- Tmesiphantes guayarus Fabiano-da-Silva, Guadanucci & DaSilva, 2019 - Brazil
- Tmesiphantes hypogeus Bertani, Bichuette & Pedroso, 2013 - Brazil
- Tmesiphantes intiyaykuy Nicoletta, Ferretti, Chaparro & West, 2022 - Peru
- Tmesiphantes janeira (Keyserling, 1891) - Peru
- Tmesiphantes mirim Fabiano-da-Silva, Guadanucci & DaSilva, 2015 - Brazil
- Tmesiphantes mutquina (Perafán & Pérez-Miles, 2014) - Argentina
- Tmesiphantes nordestinus Fabiano-da-Silva, Guadanucci & DaSilva, 2019 - Brazil
- Tmesiphantes nubilus Simon, 1892 (type) - Brazil
- Tmesiphantes obesus (Simon, 1892) - Brazil
- Tmesiphantes perp Guadanucci & Silva, 2012 - Brazil
- Tmesiphantes raulseixasi Fabiano-da-Silva, Guadanucci & DaSilva, 2019 - Brazil
- Tmesiphantes riopretano Guadanucci & Silva, 2012 - Brazil
- Tmesiphantes uru (Perafán & Pérez-Miles, 2014) - Argentina
- Tmesiphantes yupanqui (Perafán & Pérez-Miles, 2014) - Argentina

Formerly included:

- T. elegans Gerschman & Schiapelli, 1958 (Transferred to Homoeomma)
- T. serratus Gerschman & Schiapelli, 1958 (Transferred to Homoeomma)
- T. spinopalpus Schaefer, 1996 (Transferred to Cyclosternum)

Nomen dubium

- T. chickeringi Caporiacco, 1955
