= Stenotarsus russatus =

Scientific classification
- Kingdom: Animalia
- Phylum: Arthropoda
- Class: Insecta
- Order: Coleoptera
- Suborder: Polyphaga
- Infraorder: Cucujiformia
- Family: Endomychidae
- Genus: Stenotarsus
- Species: S. russatus

Binomial name
- Stenotarsus russatus Gorham, 1874

Synonyms
- Stenotarsus ceylonicus Motschulsky, 1866

Species of beetle

Stenotarsus russatus, is a species of handsome fungus beetle found in India and Sri Lanka.
