= Plesiopelma paganoi =

Scientific classification
- Kingdom: Animalia
- Phylum: Arthropoda
- Subphylum: Chelicerata
- Class: Arachnida
- Order: Araneae
- Infraorder: Mygalomorphae
- Family: Theraphosidae
- Genus: Plesiopelma
- Species: P. paganoi

Binomial name
- Plesiopelma paganoi Luis G. Pagano, 2014

Species of tarantula

Plesiopelma paganoi is a tarantula in the Plesiopelma genus, this tarantula was first described by Nelson Ferretti and Jorge Barneche in 2014. It is named in honor of Luis G. Pagano, Argentinean ornithologist who helped to collect this species. It is found in Argentina, in the Salta province, next to the south Bolivia border.

== Description ==
Plesiopelma paganoi differs from most of the Plesiopelma genus, except from P. insulare, by the high number of labial and maxillary cuspules and absence of spiniform hairs on the retrolateral face of cymbium. It differs from it because the shape of the palpal bulb, which is a slender shape, shorter with a strongly curved embolus. Its carapace and legs are dorsally black with whitish hairs on carapace border, and the abdomen is dorsally black with reddish setae.

== Habitat ==
Plesiopelma paganoi was found only in the Yungas eco-region in high cloud forest areas. A juvenile was found at the piedmont jungle in the tiny crevices underneath decomposing logs a microhabitat shared with specimens of a species of Acanthoscurria. Another juvenile was found between shrubs next to a dry river and a path. The piedmont jungle is found 400 to 700 m (1,300 to 2,300 ft) above the sea level, this jungle having a vast arrays of valleys, plains and hills, and is home to many unique species.
