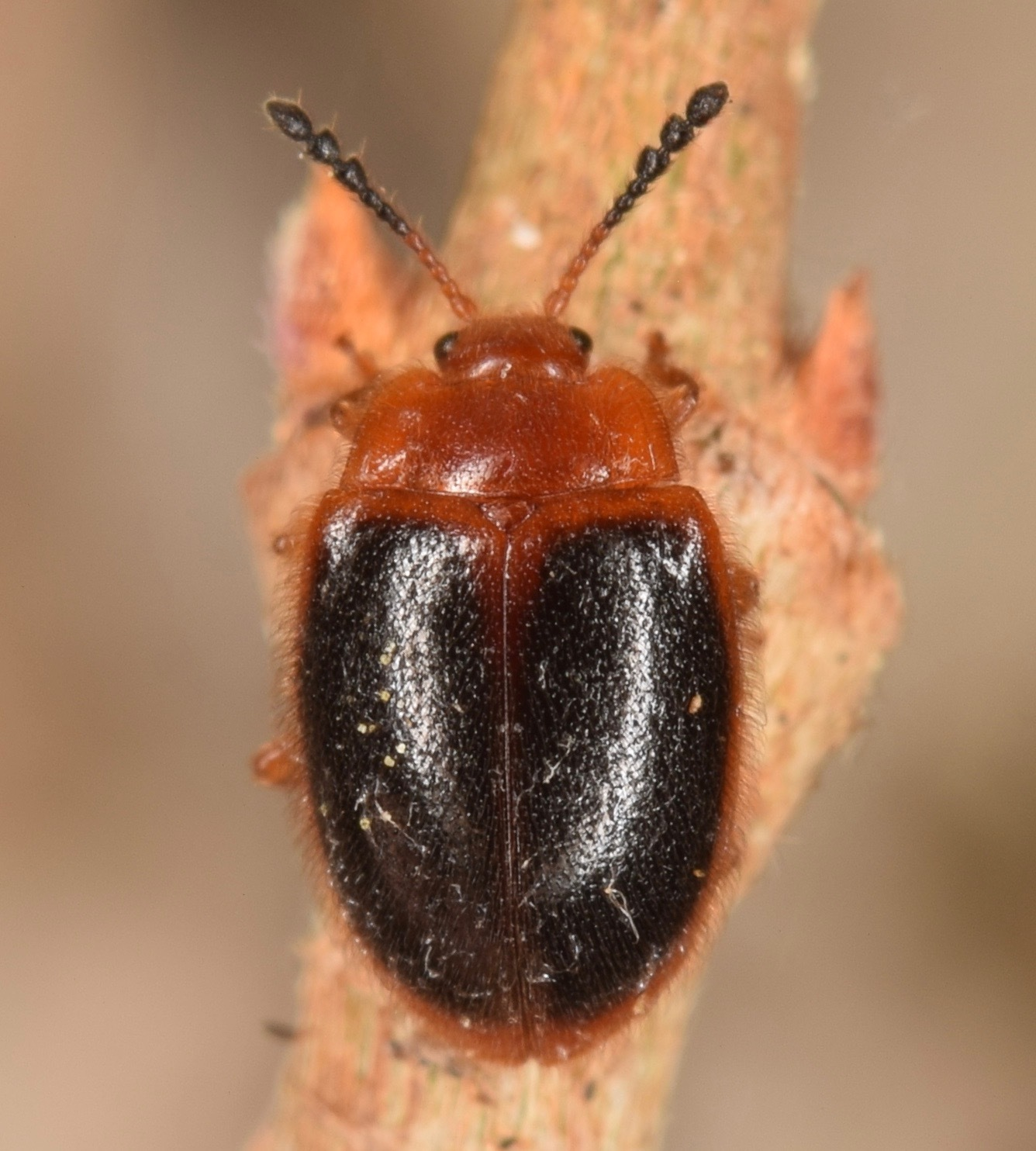

Scientific classification
- Kingdom: Animalia
- Phylum: Arthropoda
- Class: Insecta
- Order: Coleoptera
- Suborder: Polyphaga
- Infraorder: Cucujiformia
- Family: Endomychidae
- Genus: Stenotarsus
- Species: S. hispidus

Binomial name
- Stenotarsus hispidus (Herbst, 1799)

= Stenotarsus hispidus =

Species of beetle

Stenotarsus hispidus is a species of handsome fungus beetle in the family Endomychidae. It is found in North America.
