= Hapalotremus =

Scientific classification
- Kingdom: Animalia
- Phylum: Arthropoda
- Subphylum: Chelicerata
- Class: Arachnida
- Order: Araneae
- Infraorder: Mygalomorphae
- Family: Theraphosidae
- Genus: Hapalotremus; Simon, 1903

Type species
- H. albipes Simon, 1903

Species
- 14, see text

Genus of spiders

Hapalotremus is a genus of South American tarantulas in the Theraphosinae subfamily that was first described by Eugène Louis Simon in 1903. They have red or white Type III urticating (relatively long, thin) hairs, up to 1.2 millimetres (0.047 in), with a fine point and barbs along at least half of the lower part. The tibial apophysis is branched twice (in males only), and there is a conspicuous subapical keel on the male's embolus.

== Species ==
As of November 2021 it contains fourteen species, found in Argentina, Peru, and Bolivia:

- Hapalotremus albipes Simon, 1903 (type) – Bolivia
- Hapalotremus apasanka Sherwood, Ferretti, Gabriel & West, 2021 – Peru
- Hapalotremus carabaya Ferretti, Cavalllo, Chaparro, Ríos-Tamayo, Seimon & West, 2018 – Peru
- Hapalotremus chasqui Ferretti, Cavalllo, Chaparro, Ríos-Tamayo, Seimon & West, 2018 – Argentina
- Hapalotremus chespiritoi Ferretti, Cavalllo, Chaparro, Ríos-Tamayo, Seimon & West, 2018 – Peru
- Hapalotremus hananqheswa Sherwood, Ferretti, Gabriel & West, 2021 – Peru
- Hapalotremus kaderkai Sherwood, Ferretti, Gabriel & West, 2021 – Peru
- Hapalotremus kuka Ferretti, Cavalllo, Chaparro, Ríos-Tamayo, Seimon & West, 2018 – Bolivia
- Hapalotremus major (Chamberlin, 1916) – Peru
- Hapalotremus marcapata Ferretti, Cavalllo, Chaparro, Ríos-Tamayo, Seimon & West, 2018 – Peru
- Hapalotremus martinorum Cavallo & Ferretti, 2015 – Argentina
- Hapalotremus perezmilesi Ferretti, Cavalllo, Chaparro, Ríos-Tamayo, Seimon & West, 2018 – Peru
- Hapalotremus vilcanota Ferretti, Cavalllo, Chaparro, Ríos-Tamayo, Seimon & West, 2018 – Peru
- Hapalotremus yuraqchanka Sherwood, Ferretti, Gabriel & West, 2021 – Bolivia
