= Neischnocolus panamanus =

Scientific classification
- Kingdom: Animalia
- Phylum: Arthropoda
- Subphylum: Chelicerata
- Class: Arachnida
- Order: Araneae
- Infraorder: Mygalomorphae
- Family: Theraphosidae
- Genus: Neischnocolus
- Species: N. panamanus

Binomial name
- Neischnocolus panamanus Petrunkevitch, 1925

Synonyms
- Ami bladesi Pérez-Miles, Gabriel & Gallon, 2008; Crypsidromus panamana (Petrunkevitch, 1925); Lasiodora panamana (Petrunkevitch, 1925)

Species of spider

Neischnocolus panamanus is a species of spider in the tarantula family Theraphosidae, found in Costa Rica and Panama. It was first described in 1925 by Alexander Petrunkevitch. Ami bladesi is one of its synonyms.

== Taxonomy ==
Neischnocolus panamanus was first described in 1925 by Alexander Petrunkevitch as the only species of his new genus Neischnocolus and hence the type species. Independently, Pérez-Miles et al. in 2008 described a new genus Ami which included the species Ami bladesi. In 2019, Pérez-Miles and co-authors discovered that Ami bladesi was identical to Petrunkevitch's Neischnocolus panamanus, whose holotype had been rediscovered, so that the genus Ami became a junior synonym of Neischnocolus.

Pérez-Miles and co-authors also considered that Eurypelma parvior was synonymous with Neischnocolus panamanus. However, this was rejected in 2025, and Eurypelma parvior was treated as a separate species within Neischnocolus, N. parvior.

== Description ==
Neischnocolus panamanus spiders are reddish brown overall. Females have a brown abdomen, males a light yellowish brown abdomen. Both males and females have lighter brown legs with cream bands between their segments. The female holotype has a total body length of 20.5 mm (0.81 in). The carapace is 8.7 mm (0.34 in) long and 7.3 mm (0.29 in) wide. The abdomen is 11.8 mm (0.46 in) long and 8.0 mm (0.31 in) wide. The anterior row of eyes is slightly procurved, the posterior row slightly recurved. The fourth leg is longest at 20.3 mm (0.80 in), the third shortest at 16.3 mm (0.64 in). The tarsi of all the legs are densely scopulate, entirely so on the first and second legs, whereas the scopulae on the third and fourth legs are divided by a band of larger setae (wider on the fourth leg). Two features were formerly considered diagnostic of the genus Ami: modified Type 1 urticating hairs are present, and the spermathecae are of a distinctive shape.

The male was initially described as Ami bladesi. The individual described is smaller than the female with a total body length of 17.5 mm (0.69 in). The carapace is 8.6 mm (0.34 in) long and 7.5 mm (0.30 in) wide. As with the female, the fourth leg is longest at 17.7 mm (0.70 in), the third shortest at 12.8 mm (0.50 in). The tibia of the pedipalp has paired apophyses (projections) on the distal surface. There are two well-developed prolateral keels on the palpal bulb.

== Distribution ==
Neischnocolus panamanus has been mainly recorded in Panama, but has also been found in Costa Rica.
