= Aenigmarachne =

Scientific classification
- Kingdom: Animalia
- Phylum: Arthropoda
- Subphylum: Chelicerata
- Class: Arachnida
- Order: Araneae
- Infraorder: Mygalomorphae
- Family: Theraphosidae
- Subfamily: Theraphosinae
- Genus: Aenigmarachne; Schmidt, 2005

Species
- 2, see text.

Genus of spiders

Aenigmarachne is a genus of tarantulas (family Theraphosidae). It was first described by Günter E. W. Schmidt in 2005. It is currently known from Colombia and Costa Rica.

== Species ==
As of January 2026, the World Spider Catalog accepted two species:

- Aenigmarachne colombiana Osorio, Polo, Sabbatino & Martínez, 2025 – Colombia
- Aenigmarachne sinapophysis Schmidt, 2005 (type) – Costa Rica
