= Bonnetina minax =

Scientific classification
- Kingdom: Animalia
- Phylum: Arthropoda
- Subphylum: Chelicerata
- Class: Arachnida
- Order: Araneae
- Infraorder: Mygalomorphae
- Family: Theraphosidae
- Genus: Bonnetina
- Species: B. minax

Binomial name
- Bonnetina minax Ortiz & Francke, 2017

Species of tarantula

Bonnetina minax also known as Mexican copperhead tarantula, is a tarantula which was first described by David Ortiz and Oscar F. Francke in 2017. It is found in Mexico, in the state of Michoacán, and is named after the Latin adjective "minax" that means menacing, as the red found in is carapace is usually aposematic coloration.

== Description ==
The tarantula's carapace is a copper color, with a black opisthosoma covered with copper hairs, and a copper colored urticating patch. The legs are mainly grey with some copper coloration here and there and a deep black femur.

== Habitat ==
They are found in Mexico in the state of Guerrero in the San Lucas Municipality, where its mainly thorny scrubland. It is found 300m above sea level, the average yearly rainfall is 900mm and temperatures between 20 and 35 °C. With plants such as the Mexican giant cactus, amole, and cueramo.

== Behavior ==
They are terrestrial and opportunistic burrowers, and are quite calm, liking to keep in their hide. They will rarely show defensive behaviors, and they own a weak venom as they are part of the New World.
