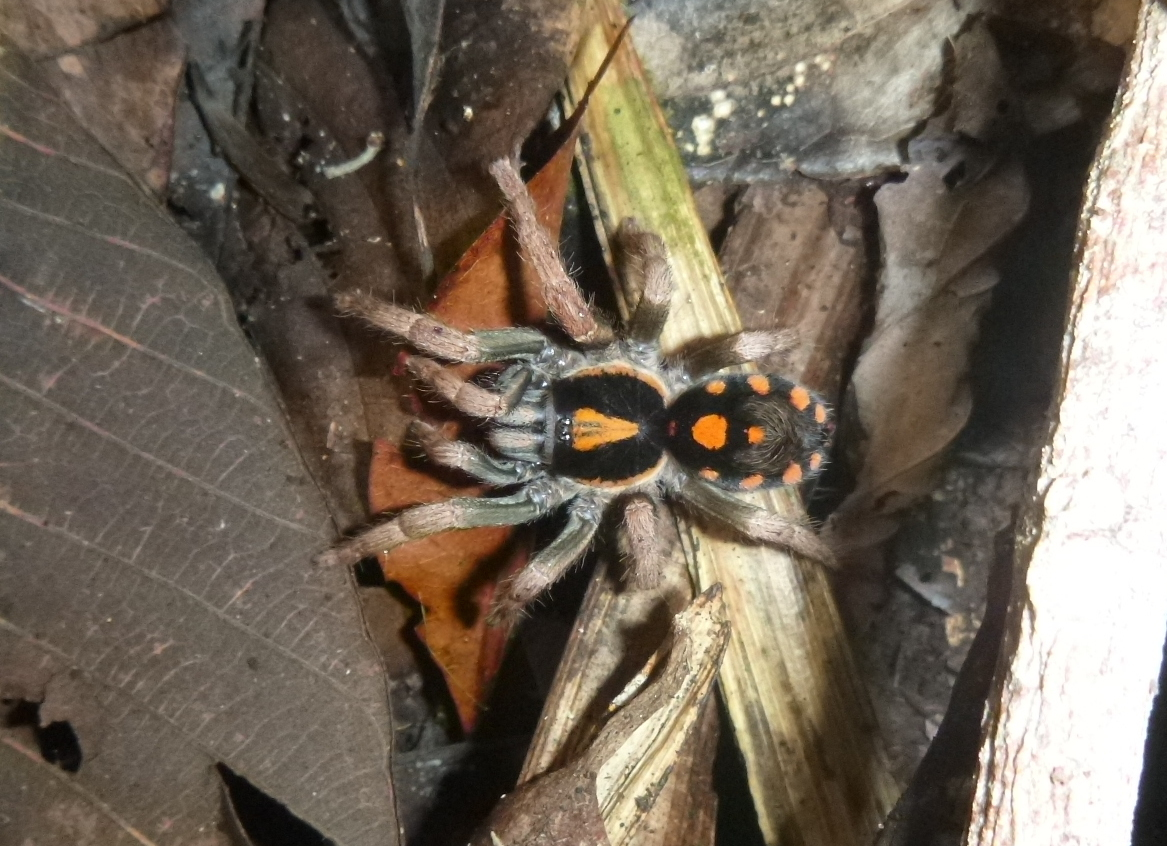

Scientific classification
- Domain: Eukaryota
- Kingdom: Animalia
- Phylum: Arthropoda
- Subphylum: Chelicerata
- Class: Arachnida
- Order: Araneae
- Infraorder: Mygalomorphae
- Family: Theraphosidae
- Genus: Hapalopus
- Species: H. coloratus

Binomial name
- Hapalopus coloratus (Valerio, 1982)

Synonyms
- Metriopelma coloratum Valerio, 1982; Neischnocolus coloratus (Valerio, 1982)

= Hapalopus coloratus =

Species of spider

Hapalopus coloratus is a species of tarantula found in Panama. It was first described by Carlos E. Valerio in 1982 as Metriopelma coloratum. It was transferred to the genus Hapalopus in 2016.
