= Neostenotarsus =

Scientific classification
- Kingdom: Animalia
- Phylum: Arthropoda
- Subphylum: Chelicerata
- Class: Arachnida
- Order: Araneae
- Infraorder: Mygalomorphae
- Family: Theraphosidae
- Genus: Neostenotarsus; Pribik & Weinmann, 2004
- Species: N. guianensis

Binomial name
- Neostenotarsus guianensis Tesmoingt & Schmidt, 2002

Genus of spiders

Neostenotarsus is a genus of theraphosid spider, in the Theraphosinae subfamily. It is native to French Guiana. It is monotypic, the only species being Neostenotarsus scissistylus.

== Taxonomy ==
The sole species was described in 2002 by Marc Tesmoingt and Gunter Schmidt as Stenotarsus scissistylus. However, the genus name was found to be occupied by the cold-enduring beetle, Stenotarsus, and the name was changed to Neostenotarsus scissistylus.

Neostenotarsus translates as "new thin foot" (Ancient Greek; στενος = "thin", ταρσυς = "foot"), and scissistylus from Latin "scissus": "torn" or "tattered"; and Greek "στυλος": "keel", referring to the embolus.

== Characteristics ==
N. scissistylus has (in the male) a deeply rutted keel on the embolus, which is distally widened. In the female, the spermathecae are widely fused with two little heads of different shape. In both sexes the fovea is procurved.
