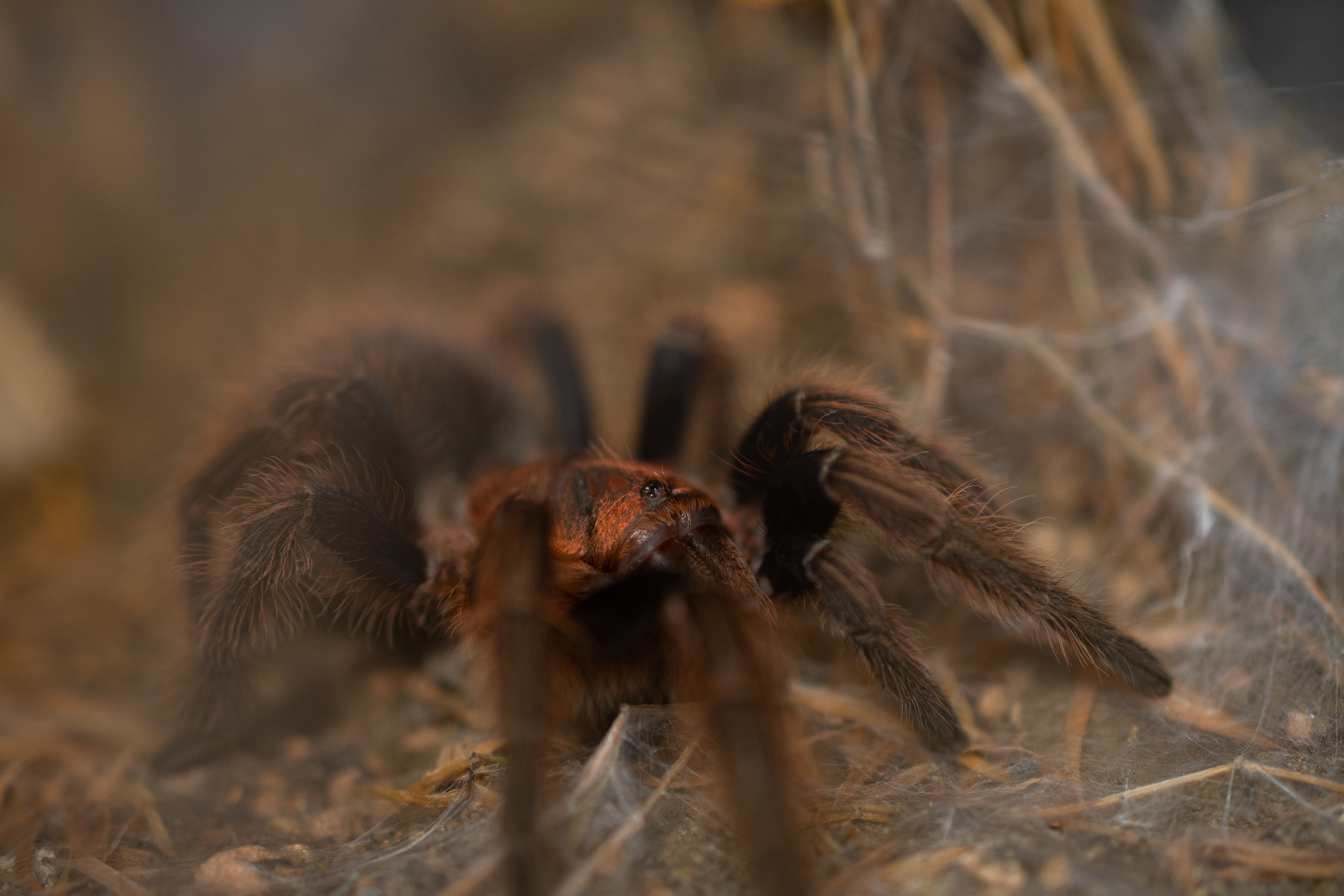

Scientific classification
- Kingdom: Animalia
- Phylum: Arthropoda
- Subphylum: Chelicerata
- Class: Arachnida
- Order: Araneae
- Infraorder: Mygalomorphae
- Clade: Avicularioidea
- Family: Theraphosidae
- Genus: Bonnetina
- Species: B. cyaneifemur

Binomial name
- Bonnetina cyaneifemur (Vol, 2000)

= Bonnetina cyaneifemur =

Species of tarantula

Bonnetina cyaneifemur, also known as the Mexican blue femur, is a species of tarantula from the genus Bonnetina. It was first described in 2000 by Fabian Vol.

The genus name is in recognition of the French arachnologist, Pierre Bonnet and the species name refers to the dark blue (cyan) color of the spider's femurs.

It is found in Mexico and has been spotted in the Mountains near Manzanillo.

== Behavior ==
The spider usually makes a burrow under the topsoil or amongst branches, rocks and other forest floor debris.
