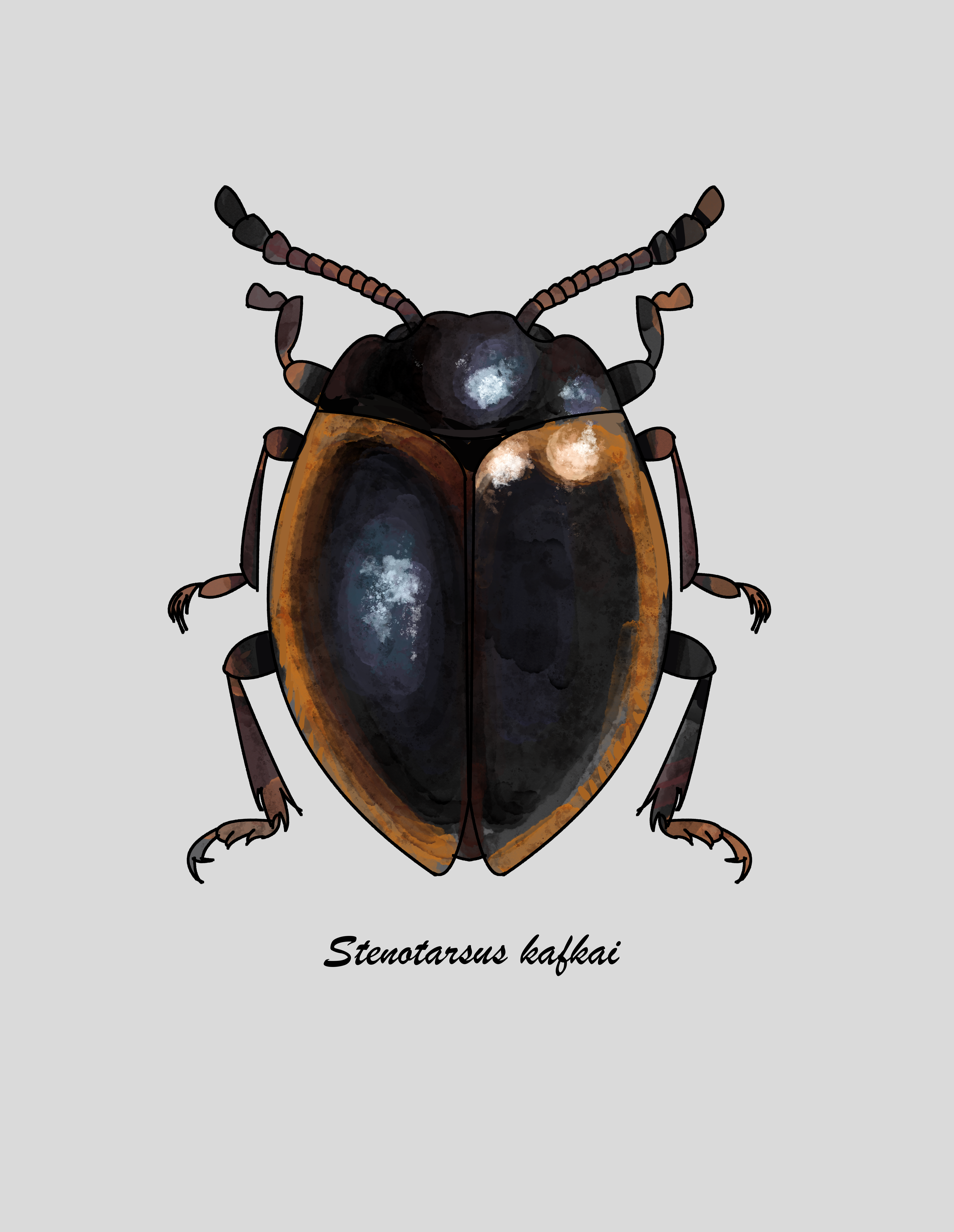

Scientific classification
- Kingdom: Animalia
- Phylum: Arthropoda
- Clade: Pancrustacea
- Class: Insecta
- Order: Coleoptera
- Suborder: Polyphaga
- Infraorder: Cucujiformia
- Family: Endomychidae
- Genus: Stenotarsus
- Species: S. kafkai

Binomial name
- Stenotarsus kafkai Arriaga-Varela et al., 2013

= Stenotarsus kafkai =

Species of beetle

Stenotarsus kafkai is a species of handsome fungus beetle. It is found in Mexico. The species name kafkai is a direct tribute to the late author Franz Kafka and his book The Metamorphosis. It was first described by Arriaga-Varela, Zaragoza-Caballero, Tomaszewska and Navarrete-Heredia in 2013. S. kafkai, like all Endomychidae, is an obligate fungus-feeder; specifically, this species feeds on Lactarius.

== Description ==
Stenotarsus kafkai is primarily black in color except for orange on the elytra. It is easily distinguishable from other Stenotarsus in its habitat because of its short setae.
