= Notahapalopus =

Scientific classification
- Kingdom: Animalia
- Phylum: Arthropoda
- Subphylum: Chelicerata
- Class: Arachnida
- Order: Araneae
- Infraorder: Mygalomorphae
- Family: Theraphosidae
- Genus: Notahapalopus; Sherwood, Gabriel, Peñaherrera-R., Osorio, Benavides, Hörweg, Brescovit & Lucas, 2024

Type species
- Hapalopus aymara Perdomo, Panzera & Pérez-Miles, 2009

Species
- 4, see text

Genus of spiders

Notahapalopus is a South American genus of tarantulas in the family Theraphosidae.

== Distribution ==
The genus is known from Brazil, Bolivia, and French Guiana.

== Etymology ==
The generic name indicates that this is "not a" Hapalopus.

== Taxonomy ==
The genus was erected from three species previously in Hapalopus and one newly described species.

== Species ==
As of October 2025, this genus includes four species:

- Notahapalopus aymara (Perdomo, Panzera & Pérez-Miles, 2009) – Bolivia, Brazil (type species)
- Notahapalopus gasci (Maréchal, 1996) – French Guiana
- Notahapalopus parauapebas Sherwood, Gabriel, Osorio, Benavides, Peñaherrera-R., Hörweg, Brescovit & Lucas, 2024 – Brazil
- Notahapalopus serrapelada (Fonseca-Ferreira, Zampaulo & Guadanucci, 2017) – Brazil
