= Aenigmarachne sinapophysis =

Scientific classification
- Kingdom: Animalia
- Phylum: Arthropoda
- Subphylum: Chelicerata
- Class: Arachnida
- Order: Araneae
- Infraorder: Mygalomorphae
- Family: Theraphosidae
- Genus: Aenigmarachne
- Species: A. sinapophysis

Binomial name
- Aenigmarachne sinapophysis Schmidt, 2005

Species of spider

Aenigmarachne sinapophysis is a species of spider in the tarantula family Theraphosidae, found in Costa Rica.
