= Neischnocolus samonellaacademy =

Scientific classification
- Kingdom: Animalia
- Phylum: Arthropoda
- Subphylum: Chelicerata
- Class: Arachnida
- Order: Araneae
- Infraorder: Mygalomorphae
- Family: Theraphosidae
- Genus: Neischnocolus
- Species: N. samonellaacademy

Binomial name
- Neischnocolus samonellaacademy Peñaherrera-R., León-E., Guerrero-Campoverde, Gabriel, Sherwood & Cisneros-Heredia, 2025

Species of spider

Neischnocolus samonellaacademy is a species of spider in the tarantula family Theraphosidae, found in Ecuador. It was first described in 2025. The species epithet samonellaacademy honours the YouTube channel Sam O'Nella Academy, run by American, Sam A. Miller.

== Taxonomy ==
Neischnocolus samonellaacademy was first described in 2025 by a team of arachnologists from Ecuador, Cuba and the UK. The species epithet samonellaacademy honours Sam A. Miller, the creator of the YouTube channel Sam O'Nella Academy and is intended to reflect "his unique contribution to science communication and humour, capturing the spirit of curiosity and creativity that inspires audiences worldwide". Miller had previously expressed a desire to have a species named after himself in a 2022 video on animal taxonomy.

== Description ==
Only the male has been described. Most of the distinguishing features of N. samonellaacademy are based on physiology of the male genitalia. Males of N. samonellaacademy resemble those of N. tsere in the shape of the embolus of the palpal bulb, but differ in some of the bulb's other details. The holotype male is described as being about 15.9 mm (0.63 in) long overall with a carapace of 7.6 mm (0.30 in) and an abdomen of 8.3 mm (0.33 in). The two rows of eyes are slightly recurved. The fourth pair of legs are the longest, at about 31 mm (1.22 in), with the third pair being the shortest, at about 23 mm (0.91 in). The tibia of the palp has two small conical processes pointing towards one another. The palpal bulb is strongly curved retrolaterally.

== Distribution and habitat ==
As of March 2025, the species was only known from its type locality, Río Blanco, in Zamora-Chinchipe Province, Ecuador. It was found in low montane evergreen forest at an altitude of 1,700 m (5,600 ft). Its diet, although not yet elucidated, would be expected to primarily consist of insects [cockroaches, crickets, etc.] and small birds.
