= Hapalotremus chespiritoi =

Scientific classification
- Kingdom: Animalia
- Phylum: Arthropoda
- Subphylum: Chelicerata
- Class: Arachnida
- Order: Araneae
- Infraorder: Mygalomorphae
- Family: Theraphosidae
- Genus: Hapalotremus
- Species: H. chespiritoi

Binomial name
- Hapalotremus chespiritoi Ferretti, Cavalllo, Chaparro, Ríos-Tamayo, Seimon & West, 2018

Species of arachnid

Hapalotremus chespiritoi is a tarantula in the Hapalotremus genus, first described by Nelson Ferretti, Patricio E. Cavallo, Juan C. Chaparro, Duniesky Ríos Tamayo, Tracie A. Seimon and Rick C. West in 2018. It is found in Peru, Patambuco, very close to Sicuani. This tarantula is named after Roberto Gómez Bolaños. The shape of the spermatheca of female of Hapalotremus chespiritoi resembles the small antennae of el "Chapulín Colorado", a comical superhero created by R.G. Bolaños.

== Description ==
The color has only been described in alcohol, where its carapace is pale brown with white long hairs, the legs black with white hair. The abdomen is black with white hair and some light yellow hairs on the urticating patch.
