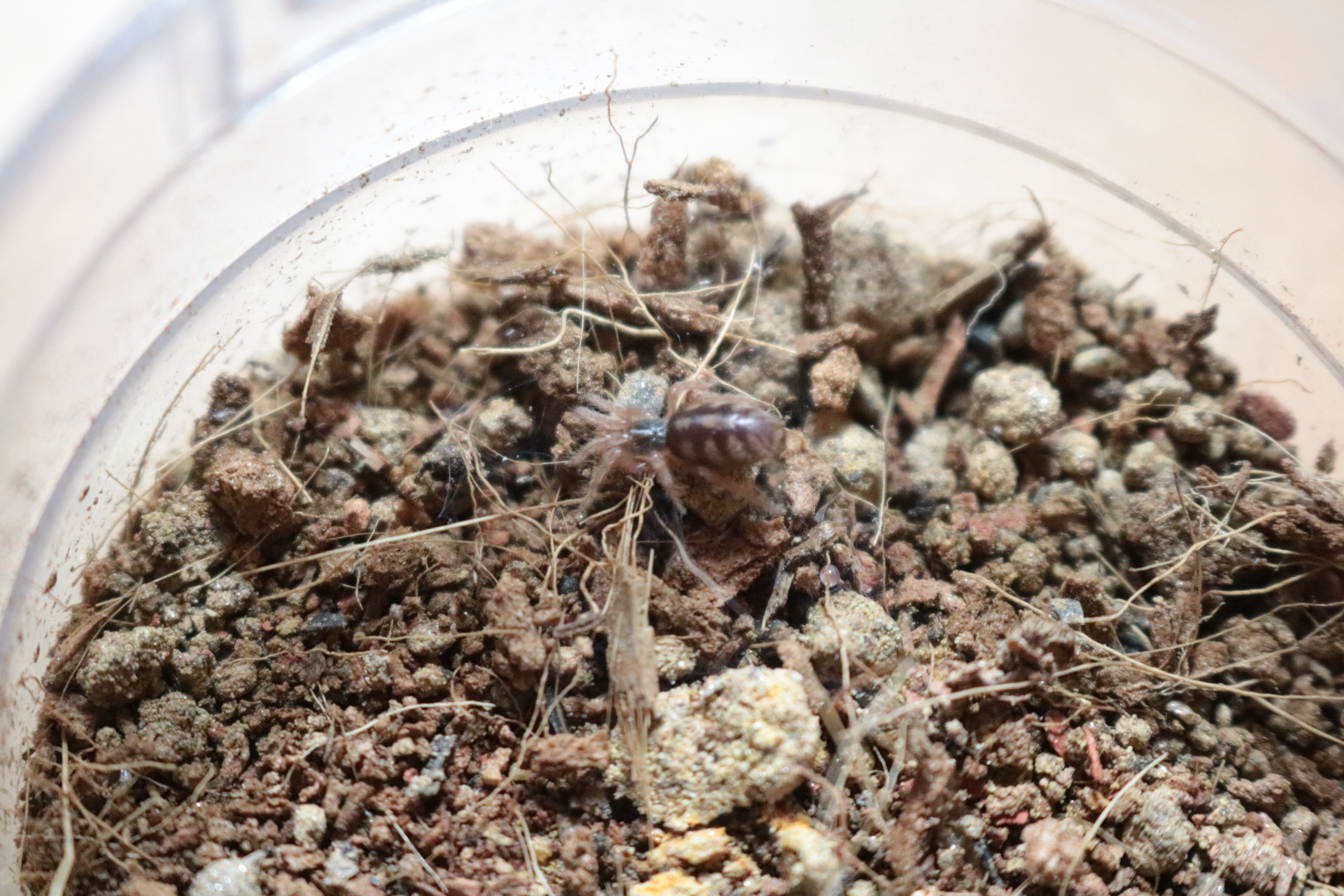

Scientific classification
- Domain: Eukaryota
- Kingdom: Animalia
- Phylum: Arthropoda
- Subphylum: Chelicerata
- Class: Arachnida
- Order: Araneae
- Infraorder: Mygalomorphae
- Family: Theraphosidae
- Genus: Hapalopus
- Species: H. formosus

Binomial name
- Hapalopus formosus Ausserer, 1875

= Hapalopus formosus =

Species of tarantula

Hapalopus formosus, also referred to as Hapalopus sp. Colombia or pumpkin patch tarantula, is a tarantula, first described by Anton Ausserer in 1875. It is found in Colombia.

== Description ==
Males of this species live from 3 to 4 years, while females live 8 to 10 years. They grow from 8 to 10cm, though some sold in the pet trade, are thought to be hybridized, making them bigger in size. They have tan, light brown legs, with a black and orange carapace. The opisthosoma is black with orange spotting, making the name sake pumpkin patch.

== Behavior ==
They are very docile tarantulas, lacking medically significant venom. Though they are fairly skittish, and do own urticating hairs. They make intricate webs, and are usually out of their burrows, which they enjoy to do.
