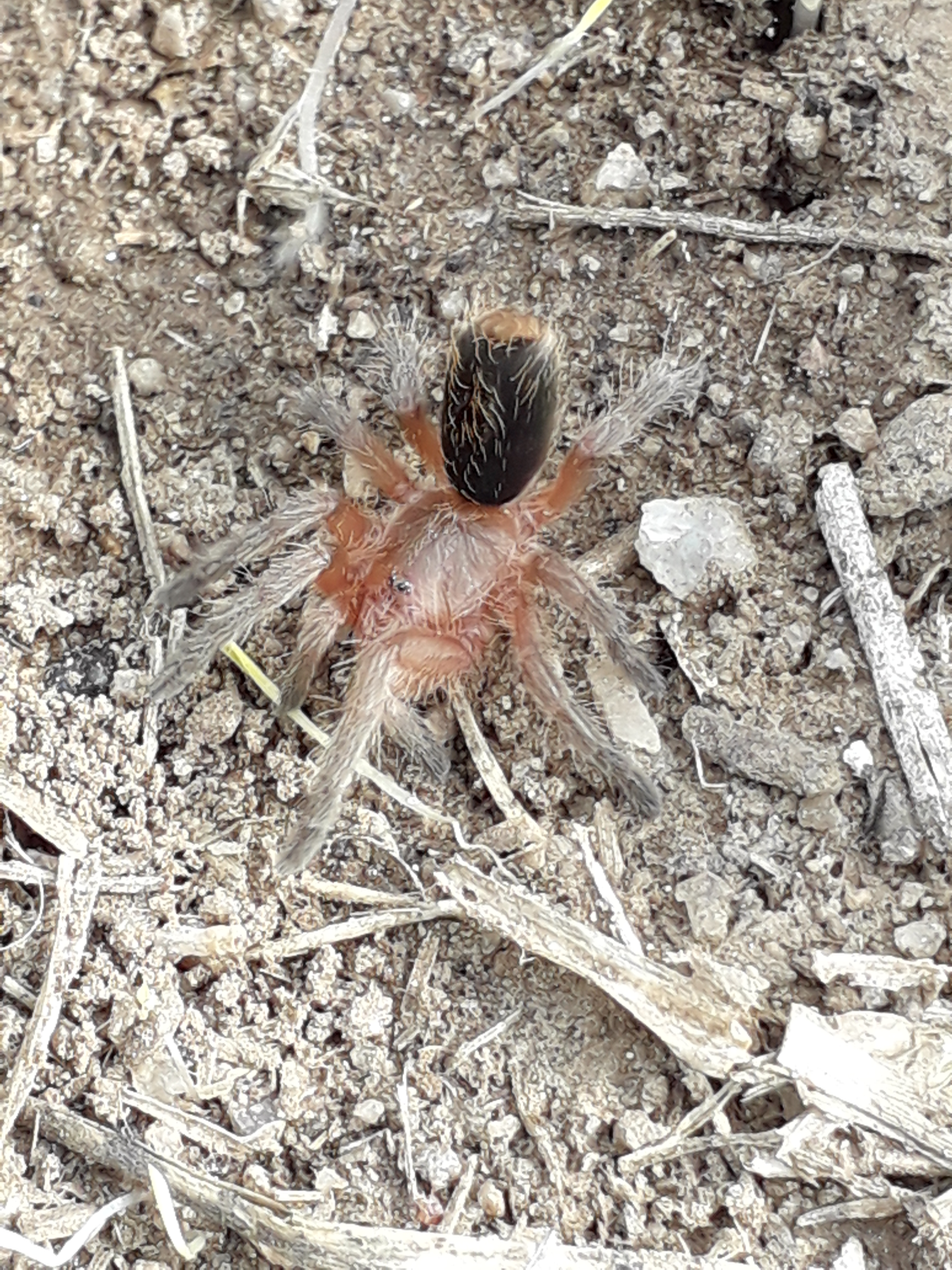
- Unidentified Plesiopelma species

Scientific classification
- Kingdom: Animalia
- Phylum: Arthropoda
- Subphylum: Chelicerata
- Class: Arachnida
- Order: Araneae
- Infraorder: Mygalomorphae
- Family: Theraphosidae
- Genus: Plesiopelma; Pocock, 1901

Type species
- P. myodes Pocock, 1901

Species
- 11, see text

Synonyms
- Ceropelma Mello-Leitão, 1923

= Plesiopelma =

Genus of spiders

Plesiopelma is a genus of South American tarantulas that was first described by Reginald Innes Pocock in 1901. Plesiopelma species are particularly abundant along mountainous ranges, frequently living under stones. Both males and females live in silk tubes under stones with aggregate spatial distribution. The walls of these tunnels are covered by waterproof silk, protecting them from floods. In addition, there is a uniform saturated microclimate inside the tunnel, which protects the spiders from dehydration.

== Species ==
As of May 2020 it contains eleven species, found in Paraguay, Uruguay, Brazil, Venezuela, and Argentina:

- Plesiopelma aspidosperma Ferretti & Barneche, 2013 – Argentina
- Plesiopelma gertschi (Caporiacco, 1955) – Venezuela
- Plesiopelma imperatrix Piza, 1976 – Brazil
- Plesiopelma insulare (Mello-Leitão, 1923) – Brazil
- Plesiopelma longisternale (Schiapelli & Gerschman, 1942) – Argentina, Uruguay
- Plesiopelma minense (Mello-Leitão, 1943) – Brazil
- Plesiopelma myodes Pocock, 1901 (type) – Uruguay
- Plesiopelma paganoi Ferretti & Barneche, 2013 – Argentina
- Plesiopelma physopus (Mello-Leitão, 1926) – Brazil
- Plesiopelma rectimanum (Mello-Leitão, 1923) – Brazil
- Plesiopelma semiaurantiacum (Simon, 1897) – Paraguay, Uruguay

Formerly included:

- P. flavohirtum (Simon, 1889) (Transferred to Catanduba)
