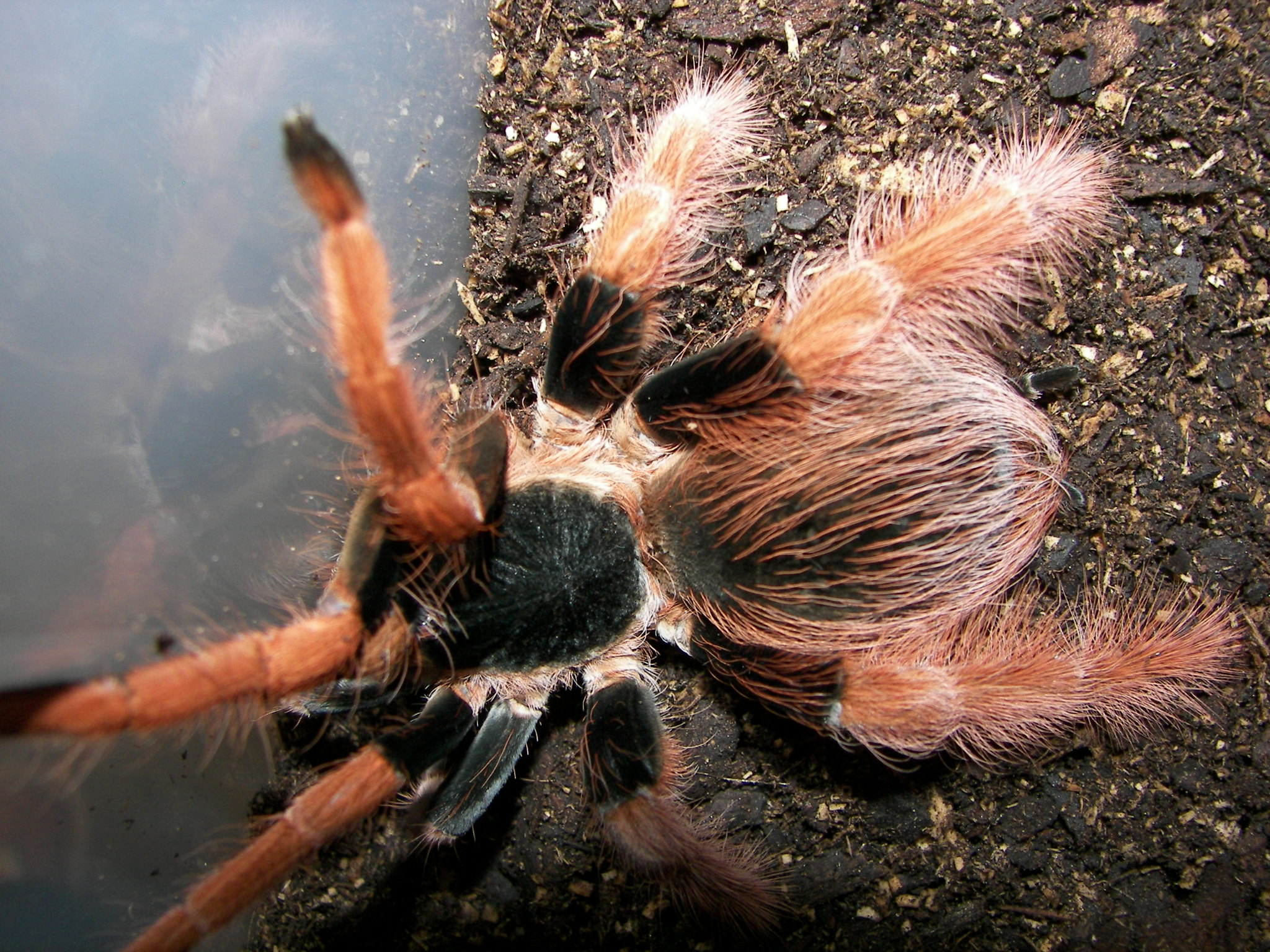

Scientific classification
- Kingdom: Animalia
- Phylum: Arthropoda
- Subphylum: Chelicerata
- Class: Arachnida
- Order: Araneae
- Infraorder: Mygalomorphae
- Family: Theraphosidae
- Genus: Megaphobema
- Species: M. robustum

Binomial name
- Megaphobema robustum (Ausserer, 1875)

= Megaphobema robustum =

Colombian giant tarantula

Species of spider

Megaphobema robustum, known as the Colombian giant tarantula or Colombian giant redleg, was first described by Anton Ausserer in 1875. Found in the tropical rainforests of Colombia and Brazil near logs, it has a span of 6 to 8 inches and will eat crickets, other large insects, small lizards, and mice.

== Description ==
Their carapace is a deep black color, with a pale orange color, the opisthosoma is also a deep black color covered with orange hairs. Most of the legs, with the exception of the femur which is also black, are a bright orange and are covered in orange hairs.

== Habitat ==
They are found the tropical rainforests of Colombia and Brazil. The average yearly rainfall of this area is 2,500mm, with average temperatures usually above 23 °C. It is home to plants such as Cavanillesia platanifolia, and animals such as Lance-tailed manakin, and the glass frogs.

== Behavior ==
This tarantula is shy in nature, though it is more willing to be defensive than other New World tarantulas. But will usually flee instead of putting a defensive pose. Although their threat pose is also quite unique, as they own some barbs in their back legs, they will lunge with those legs or will spin in a circle to confuse their attacker. They are terrestrial tarantulas, though they are not all that active out of their hide.
