= Schizopelma =

Scientific classification
- Kingdom: Animalia
- Phylum: Arthropoda
- Subphylum: Chelicerata
- Class: Arachnida
- Order: Araneae
- Infraorder: Mygalomorphae
- Family: Theraphosidae
- Genus: Schizopelma; F. O. Pickard-Cambridge, 1897

Type species
- S. bicarinatum F. O. Pickard-Cambridge, 1897

Species
- S. bicarinatum F. O. Pickard-Cambridge, 1897 – Mexico, Central America; S. juxtantricola (Ortiz & Francke, 2015) – Mexico

Genus of spiders

Schizopelma is a genus of tarantulas that was first described by Frederick Octavius Pickard-Cambridge in 1897. As of May 2020 it contains two species, found in Central America and Mexico: S. bicarinatum and S. juxtantricola.
