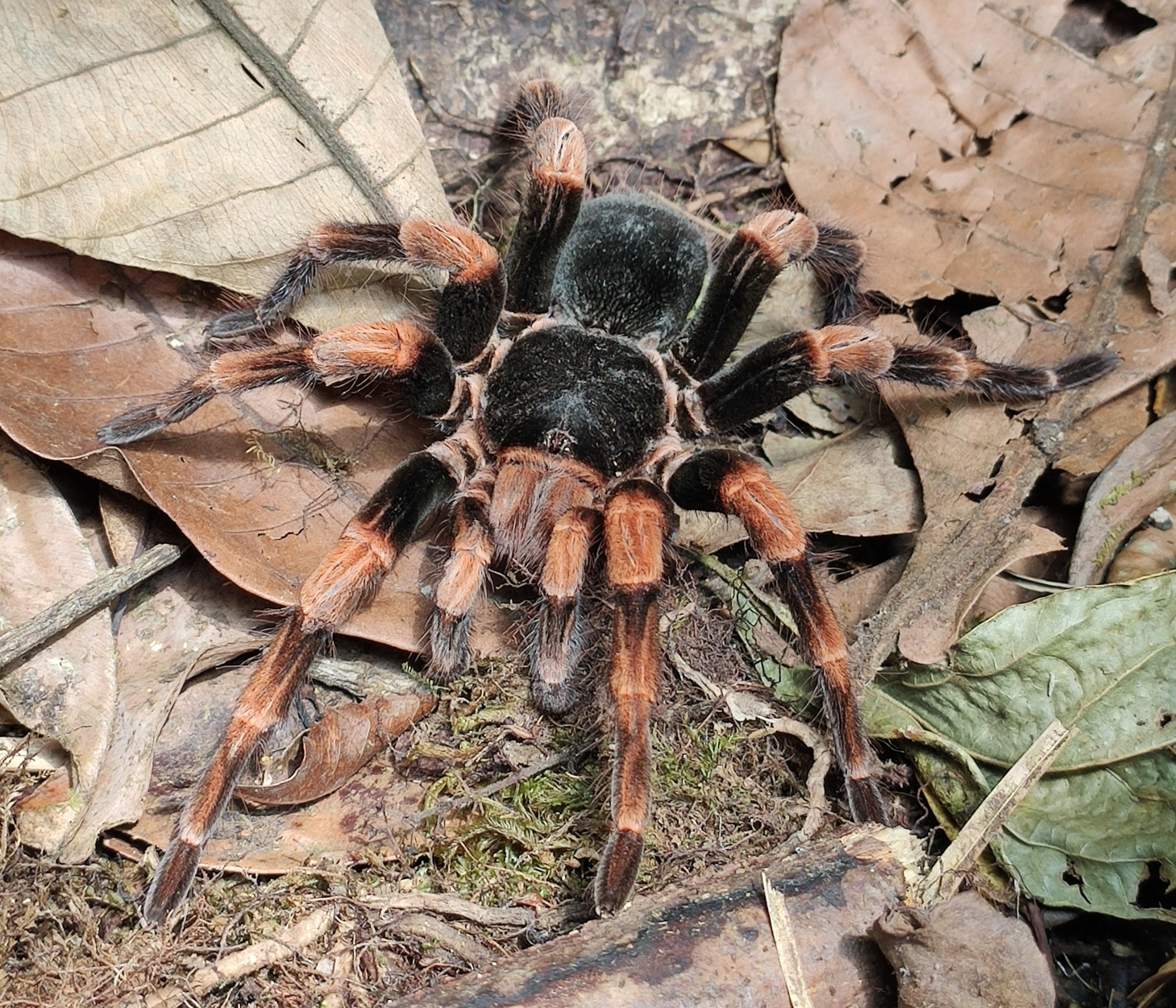
- A. mesomelas in Costa Rica

Scientific classification
- Kingdom: Animalia
- Phylum: Arthropoda
- Subphylum: Chelicerata
- Class: Arachnida
- Order: Araneae
- Infraorder: Mygalomorphae
- Family: Theraphosidae
- Genus: Abdomegaphobema; Sherwood, Gabriel, Peñaherrera-R., Léon-E., Cisneros-Heredia, Brescovit & Lucas, 2023

Type species
- Eurypelma mesomelas O. Pickard-Cambridge, 1892

Species
- 2, see text

= Abdomegaphobema =

Genus of spiders

Abdomegaphobema is a genus of spiders in the family Theraphosidae.

== Distribution ==
Both described species are endemic to Costa Rica.

== Taxonomy ==
Both species were transferred to this newly erected genus from Megaphobema in 2023.

== Species ==
As of October 2025, this genus includes two species:

- Abdomegaphobema mesomelas (O. Pickard-Cambridge, 1892) – Costa Rica (type species)
- Abdomegaphobema peterklaasi (Schmidt, 1994) – Costa Rica
