= Bonnetina =

- Bonnetina rudloffi

Scientific classification
- Kingdom: Animalia
- Phylum: Arthropoda
- Subphylum: Chelicerata
- Class: Arachnida
- Order: Araneae
- Infraorder: Mygalomorphae
- Family: Theraphosidae
- Genus: Bonnetina; Vol, 2000

Type species
- B. cyaneifemur Vol, 2000

Species
- 16, see text

Genus of spiders

Bonnetina is a genus of Mexican tarantulas that was first described by F. Vol in 2000.

== Morphology ==
Before the era of genetics and molecular phylogeny, tarantulas were classified based on the presence or absence of physical traits and characteristics. However, tarantulas happen to be excessively homoplastic, meaning the same seemingly unique characteristics have evolved separately rather than from a common ancestor, leading to many misplacements and misidentifications, and this genus is no different.

In 2018, a molecular study and phylogenetic analysis by Ortiz, Francke, and Bond aimed to create a timeline in the evolution of Bonnetina and to address possible monophyly in the genus. They sampled DNA from select taxa, sequencing five nuclear markers and one mitochondrial marker, concluding that Bonnetina was composed of unrelated species that simply shared physical attributes, with the exception of B. juxtantricola. Only the sexual features were observed not to be homoplastic, suggesting that sexual selection may have been a driving force in their divergence.

== Species ==
As of December 2019 it contains sixteen species, all found in Mexico:

- Bonnetina alagoni Locht & Medina, 2008 – Mexico
- Bonnetina aviae Estrada-Alvarez & Locht, 2011 – Mexico
- Bonnetina cyaneifemur Vol, 2000 (type) – Mexico
- Bonnetina flammigera Ortiz & Francke, 2017 – Mexico
- Bonnetina hijmenseni Ortiz & Francke, 2017 – Mexico
- Bonnetina hobbit Ortiz & Francke, 2017 – Mexico
- Bonnetina julesvernei Ortiz & Francke, 2017 – Mexico
- Bonnetina malinalli Ortiz & Francke, 2017 – Mexico
- Bonnetina megagyna Ortiz & Francke, 2017 – Mexico
- Bonnetina minax Ortiz & Francke, 2017 – Mexico
- Bonnetina papalutlensis Mendoza, 2012 – Mexico
- Bonnetina tanzeri Schmidt, 2012 – Mexico
- Bonnetina tenuiverpis Ortiz & Francke, 2015 – Mexico
- Bonnetina tindoo Ortiz & Francke, 2017 – Mexicoa
- Bonnetina unam Ortiz & Francke, 2017 – Mexico
- Bonnetina vittata Ortiz & Francke, 2017 – Mexico

In synonymy:

- B. reyescastilloi Estrada-Alvarez, 2014 = Bonnetina tanzeri Schmidt, 2012
