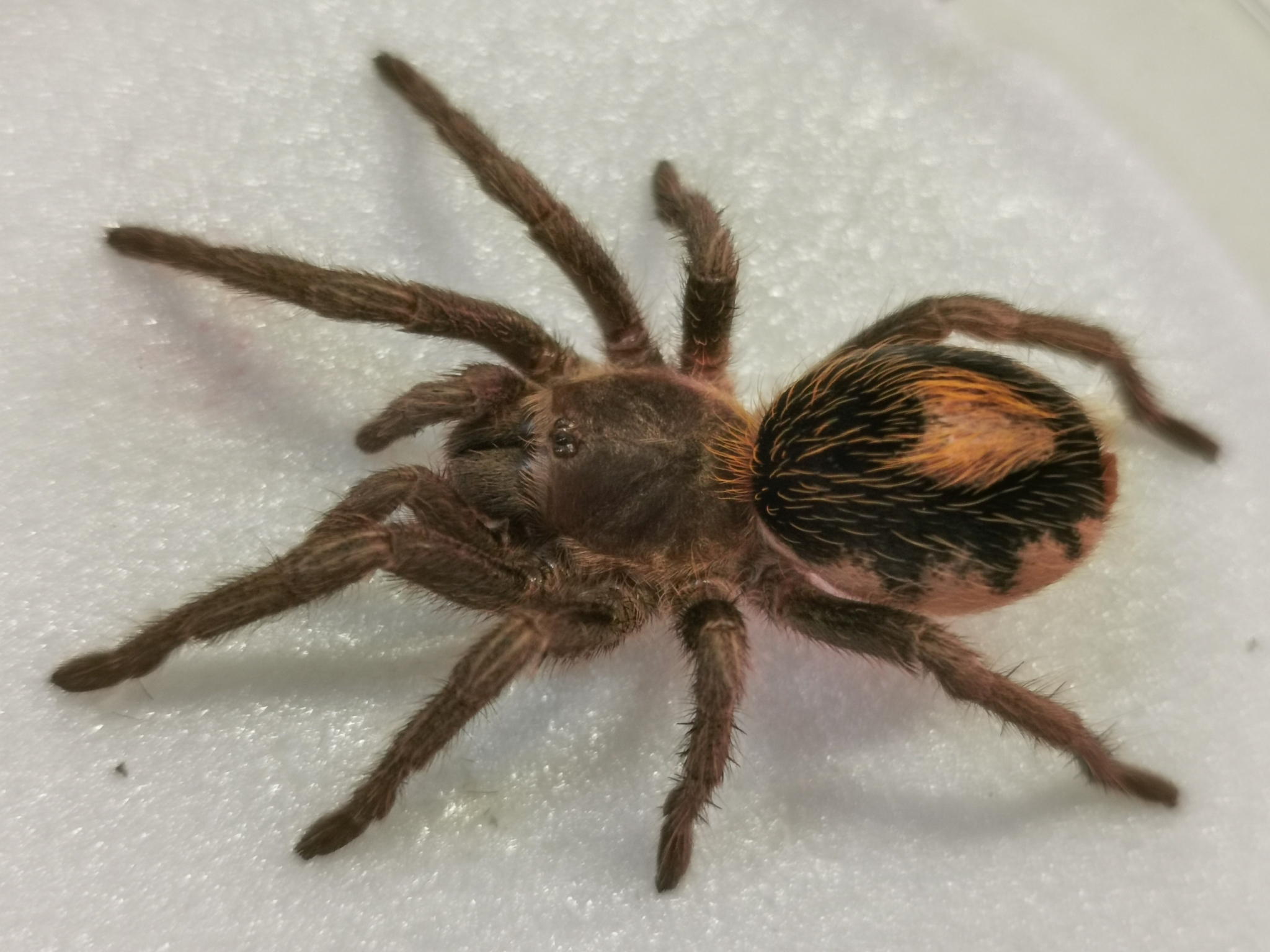
- Catanduba simoni

Scientific classification
- Kingdom: Animalia
- Phylum: Arthropoda
- Subphylum: Chelicerata
- Class: Arachnida
- Order: Araneae
- Infraorder: Mygalomorphae
- Family: Theraphosidae
- Genus: Catanduba; Yamamoto, Lucas & Brescovit, 2012

Type species
- C. tuskae Yamamoto, Lucas & Brescovit, 2012

Species
- 7, see text

= Catanduba =

Genus of spiders

Catanduba is a genus of South American tarantulas that was first described by F. U. Yamamoto, S. M. Lucas & Antônio Domingos Brescovit in 2012.

== Species ==
As of December 2019 it contains seven species, all found in Brazil:

- Catanduba araguaia Yamamoto, Lucas & Brescovit, 2012 – Brazil
- Catanduba canabrava Yamamoto, Lucas & Brescovit, 2012 – Brazil
- Catanduba flavohirta (Simon, 1889) – Brazil
- Catanduba peruacu Yamamoto, Lucas & Brescovit, 2012 – Brazil
- Catanduba piauiensis Yamamoto, Lucas & Brescovit, 2012 – Brazil
- Catanduba simoni (Soares & Camargo, 1948) – Brazil
- Catanduba tuskae Yamamoto, Lucas & Brescovit, 2012 (type) – Brazil
