= Munduruku bicoloratum =

Scientific classification
- Kingdom: Animalia
- Phylum: Arthropoda
- Subphylum: Chelicerata
- Class: Arachnida
- Order: Araneae
- Infraorder: Mygalomorphae
- Family: Theraphosidae
- Genus: Munduruku; Miglio, Bonaldo, & Pérez-Miles, 2013
- Species: M. bicoloratum

Binomial name
- Munduruku bicoloratum Miglio, Bonaldo, & Pérez-Miles, 2013

Species of spider

Munduruku bicoloratum is a theraphosid spider, endemic to Brazil, and is the only species in the monotypic genus Munduruku.

== Etymology ==
The generic name "Munduruku" comes from the Munduruku people, who inhabited the region where the types were collected. The specific name "bicoloratum" comes from Latin, meaning "two-coloured" referring to the abdominal colours.

== Classification ==
Munduruku bicoloratum could be placed in the genus Plesiopelma, but its characteristics show that this would broaden the diagnostic features of this genus too much, therefore causing it to become a nonmonophyletic group.

== Characteristics ==
This genus has a unique abdominal pattern, and has a sub-apical keel on the embolus. It also has urticating hair type III in the male, and types III and IV in the female. It also lacks a process on the first male metatarsus and has a tibial spur that has fused bases and converging branches.
