= Reversopelma =

Scientific classification
- Kingdom: Animalia
- Phylum: Arthropoda
- Subphylum: Chelicerata
- Class: Arachnida
- Order: Araneae
- Infraorder: Mygalomorphae
- Family: Theraphosidae
- Genus: Reversopelma; Schmidt, 2001
- Species: R. petersi

Binomial name
- Reversopelma petersi Schmidt, 2001

Genus of spiders

Reversopelma is a monotypic genus of spider in the family Theraphosidae. It is Theraphosine and is native to Peru and Ecuador. The single species is Reversopelma petersi.

== Description ==
Reversopelma shows strong sexual dimorphism, the female being light brown on the cephalothorax and having a black abdomen, whilst the male is much darker overall. It is quite small (30–35 mm), and the scopulae on the fourth tarsus of the legs are divided by bristles. The embolus is long and quite wide. The male has urticating hair Type III, and the female has modified Type I, which are divided twice. The fourth metatarsus is not scopulate.

== As a pet ==
This species is sometimes kept as a pet, and has been imported since 1909 from Peru. It needs a quite wet and relatively cool environment.
