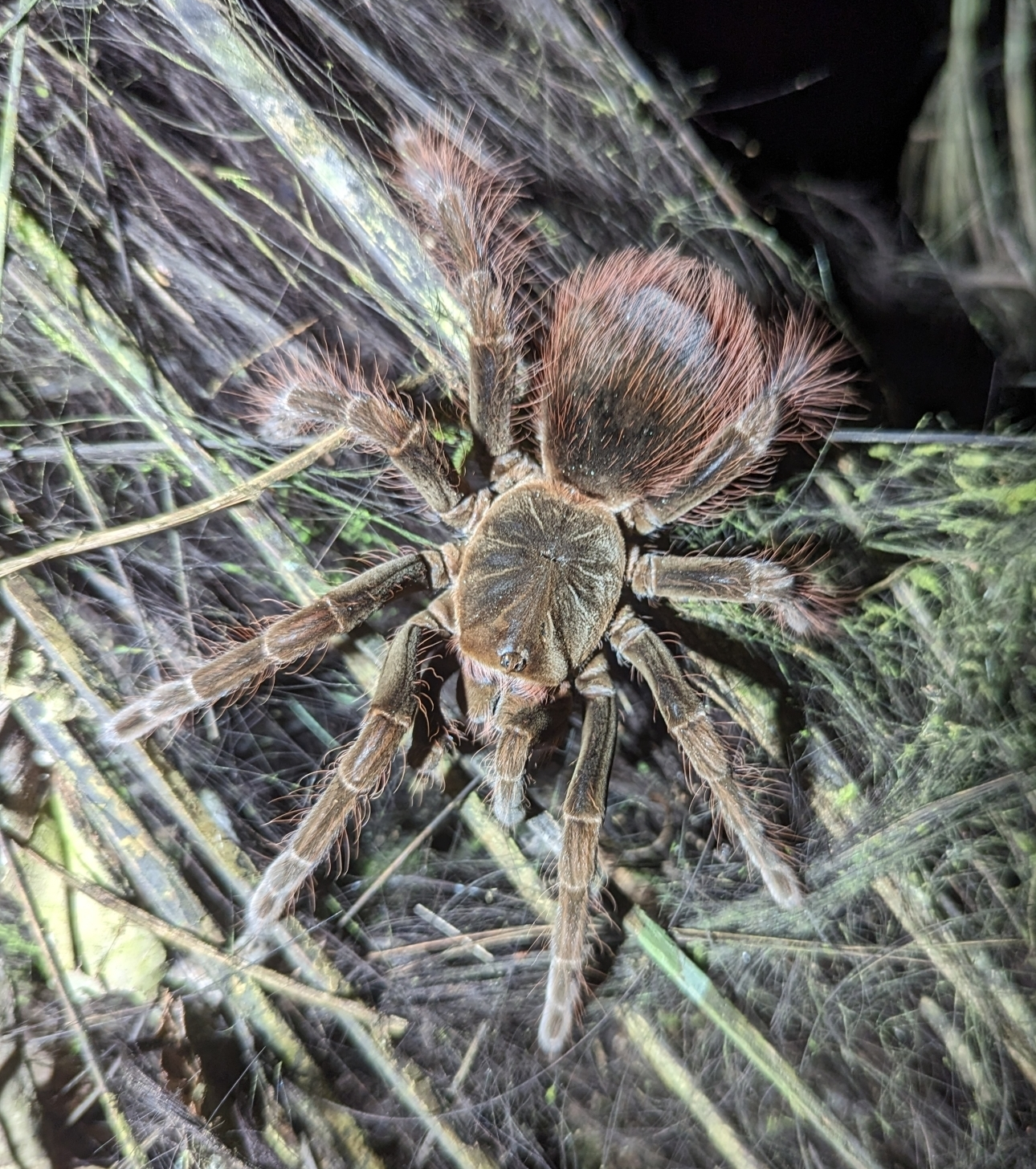
- M. velvetosoma
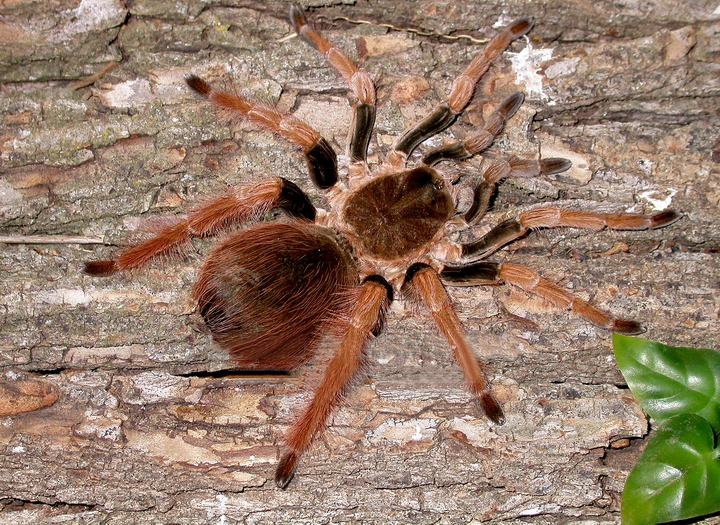
- M. robustum

Scientific classification
- Kingdom: Animalia
- Phylum: Arthropoda
- Subphylum: Chelicerata
- Class: Arachnida
- Order: Araneae
- Infraorder: Mygalomorphae
- Family: Theraphosidae
- Genus: Megaphobema; Pocock, 1901

Type species
- M. robustum (Ausserer, 1875)

Species
- 4, see text

= Megaphobema =

Genus of spiders

Megaphobema is a genus of tarantulas that was first described by Reginald Innes Pocock in 1901. They look similar to members of Pamphobeteus except for its legs; the third and fourth pairs of legs are much larger and stronger than the first two pairs.

== Distribution ==
Its described species are found in Ecuador, Brazil, Colombia, Costa Rica and Peru.

== Species ==
As of October 2025, this genus includes four species:

- Megaphobema lakoi (Mello-Leitão, 1943) – Brazil
- Megaphobema robustum (Ausserer, 1875) – Colombia (type species)
- Megaphobema teceae Pérez-Miles, Miglio & Bonaldo, 2006 – Brazil
- Megaphobema velvetosoma Schmidt, 1995 – Ecuador, Peru, Brazil
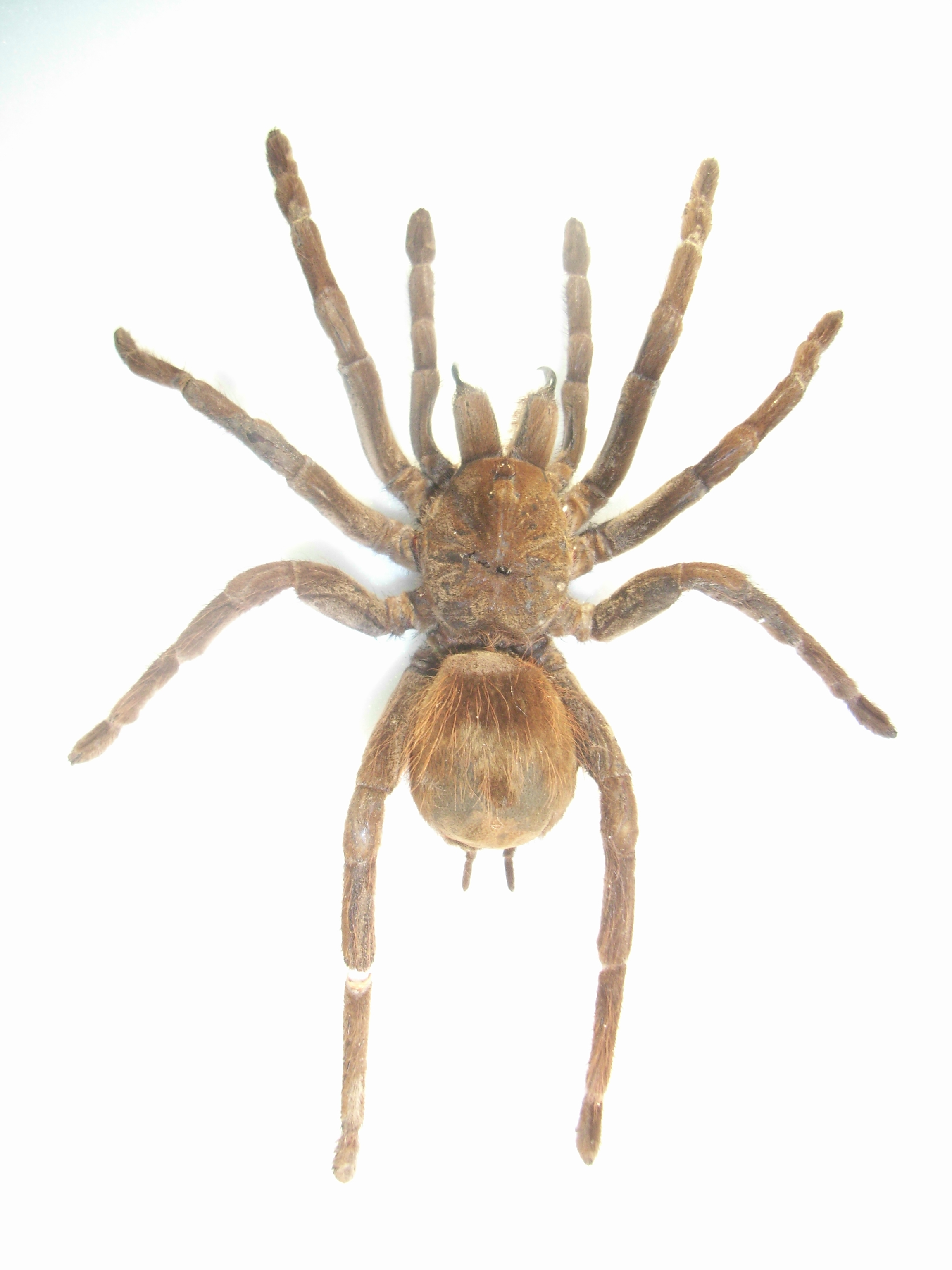
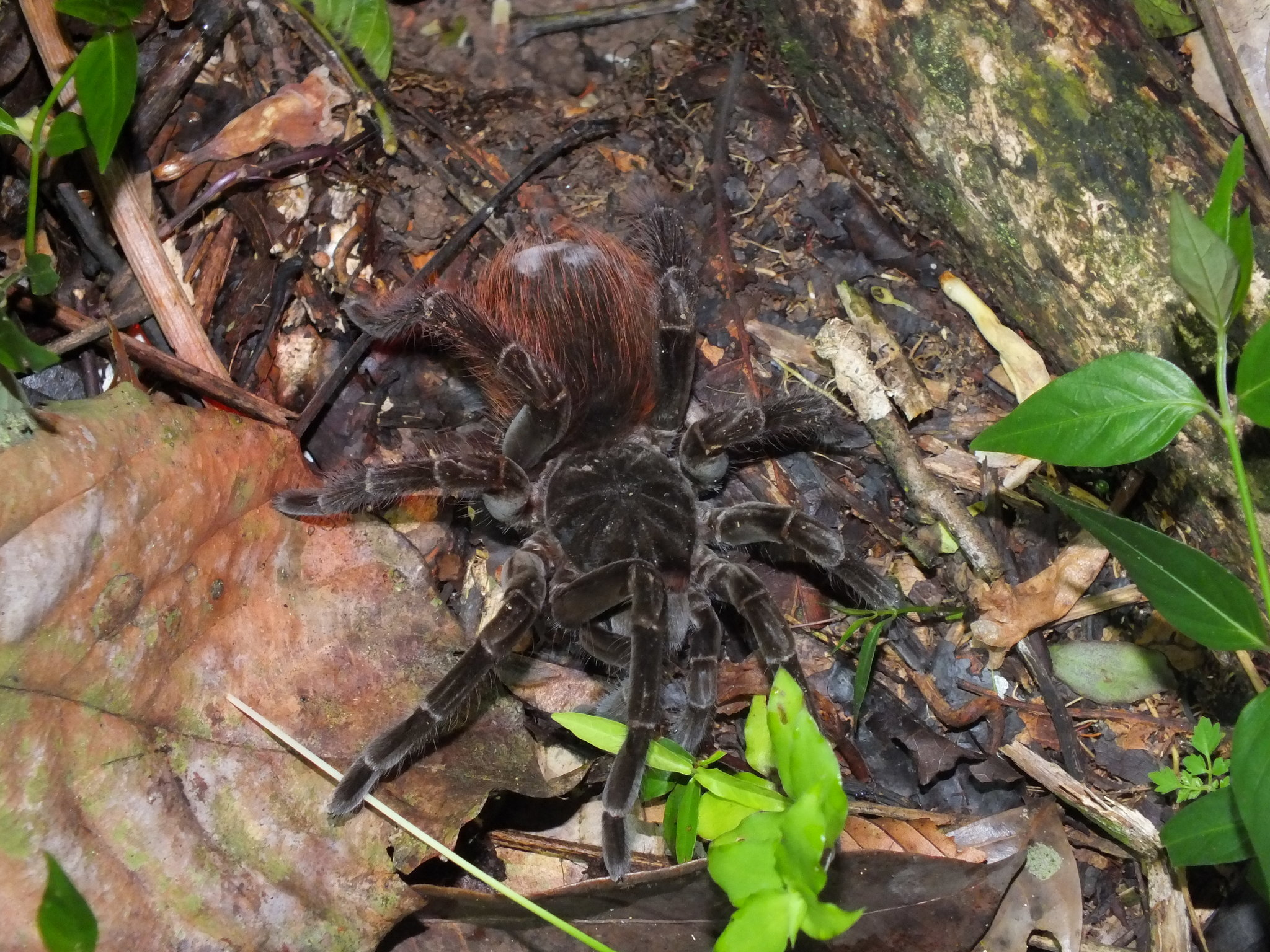
M. velvetosoma Left:Brown morph Right:Black Morph

M. mesomelas and M. peterklaasi were transferred to the new genus Abdomegaphobema in 2023.
