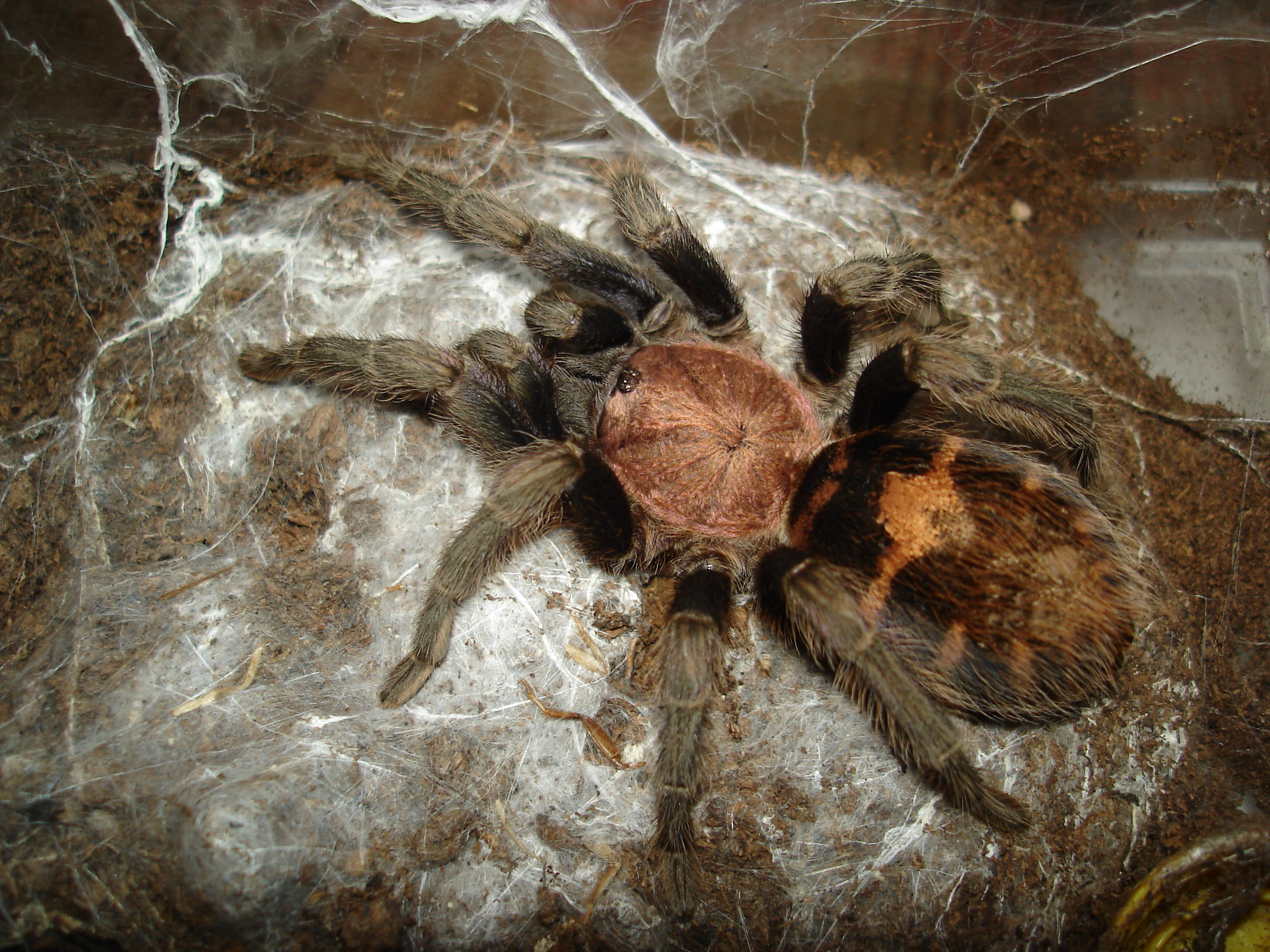
- Davus pentaloris

Scientific classification
- Kingdom: Animalia
- Phylum: Arthropoda
- Subphylum: Chelicerata
- Class: Arachnida
- Order: Araneae
- Infraorder: Mygalomorphae
- Family: Theraphosidae
- Subfamily: Theraphosinae

Genera
- See text
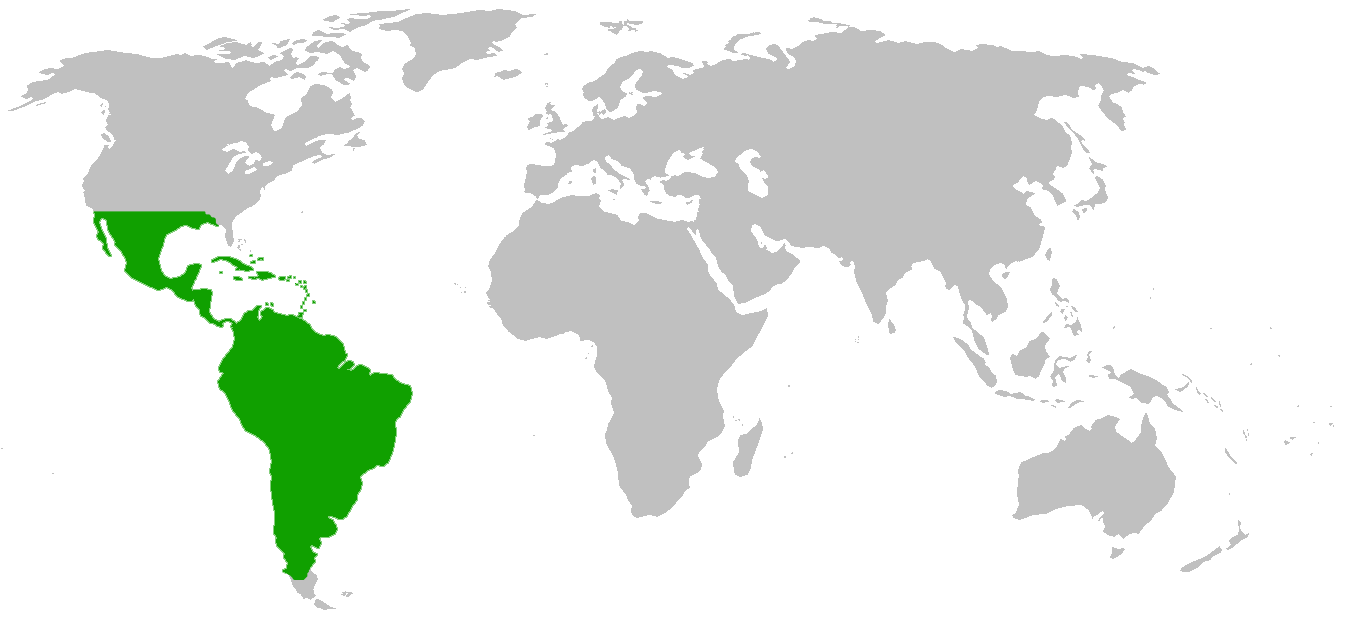
- Range of Theraphosinae

= Theraphosinae =

Subfamily of spiders

The Theraphosinae are a large subfamily of Mygalomorphae spiders in the family Theraphosidae found primarily in the Neotropical realm.

== Genera ==
The subfamily Theraphosinae includes these genera:

- Abdomegaphobema
- Acanthoscurria
- Aenigmarachne
- Anqasha
- Aphonopelma
- Bonnetina
- Brachypelma
- Bumba (formerly Maraca)
- Chromatopelma
- Citharacanthus
- Clavopelma
- Crassicrus
- Cyclosternum
- Cyriocosmus
- Cyrtopholis
- Euathlus
- Eupalaestrus
- Grammostola
- Hapalopus
- Hapalotremus
- Hemirrhagus
- Homoeomma
- Lasiodora
- Lasiodorides
- Magulla
- Megaphobema
- Melloleitaoina
- Metriopelma
- Munduruku
- Neostenotarsus
- Nesipelma
- Nhandu
- Ozopactus
- Pamphobeteus
- Paraphysa
- Phormictopus
- Plesiopelma
- Proshapalopus
- Pseudhapalopus
- Reversopelma
- Sandinista
- Schizopelma
- Sericopelma
- Sphaerobothria
- Stichoplastoris
- Theraphosa
- Thrixopelma
- Tliltocatl
- Tmesiphantes
- Vitalius
- Xenesthis
