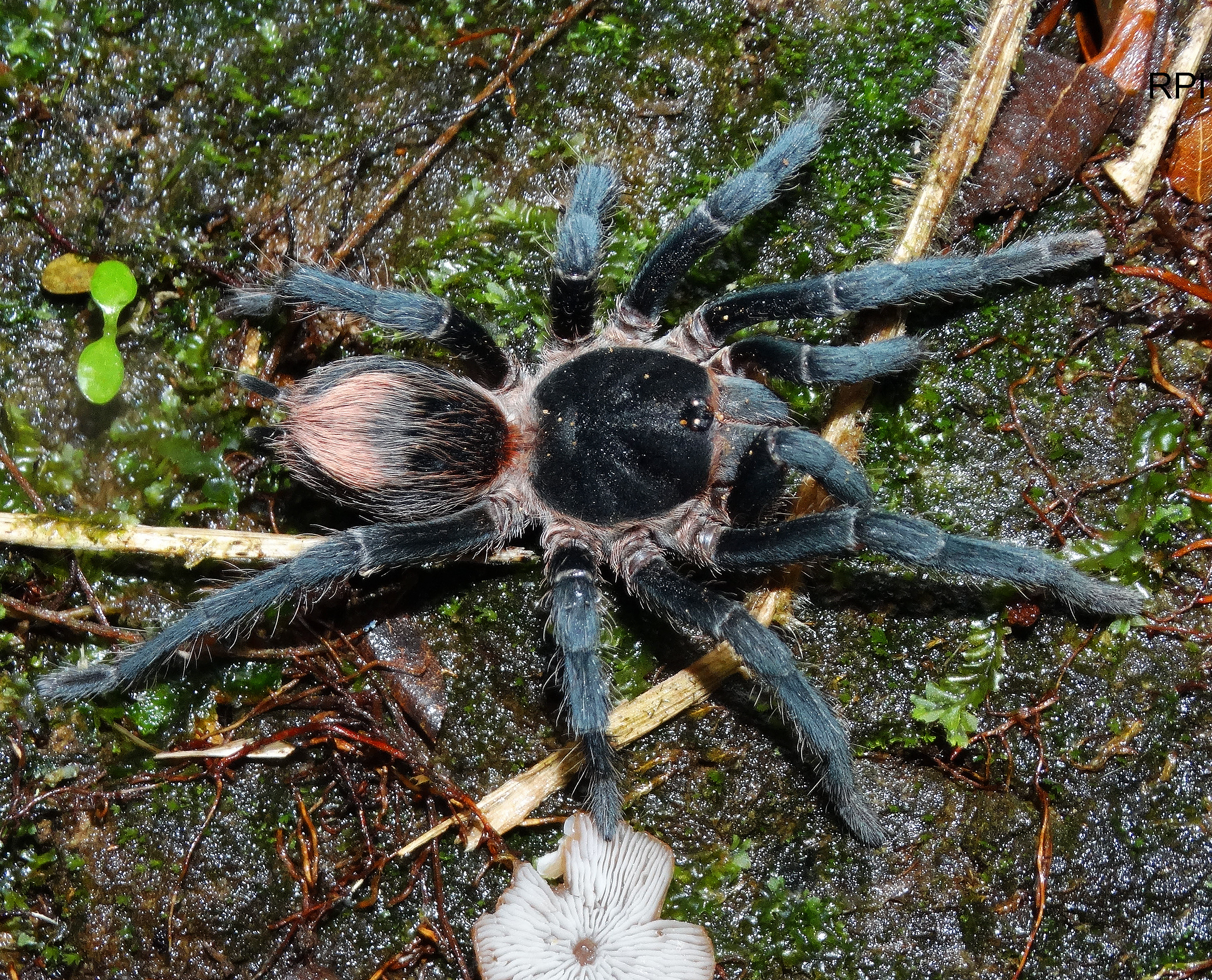

Scientific classification
- Kingdom: Animalia
- Phylum: Arthropoda
- Subphylum: Chelicerata
- Class: Arachnida
- Order: Araneae
- Infraorder: Mygalomorphae
- Family: Theraphosidae
- Genus: Homoeomma; Ausserer, 1871

Type species
- H. stradlingi O. Pickard-Cambridge, 1881

Species
- 13, see text

Synonyms
- Butantania Mello-Leitão, 1935; Calopelma Chamberlin, 1917; Cyclothoracoides Strand, 1929; Cyclothorax Mello-Leitão, 1923

= Homoeomma =

Genus of spiders

Homoeomma (eyelike, from Ancient Greek ὅμοιος, like, and ὄμμα, eye) is a genus of South American tarantulas that was first described by Anton Ausserer in 1871. It is considered a senior synonym of Calopelma, Butantania, and of Cyclothoracoides. These tarantulas are usually quite small and usually burrow a few centimeters under a rock or log.

== Diagnosis ==
Males of this genus can be distinguished by the tile-like apophysis on the base of the palpal bulb, and the embolus being in an obtuse angle, in relation to the bulb. Males also have a flexion of the metatarsus 1, which is between the branches of the tibial apophysis. Females can be distinguished by the spermatheca morphology, which lacks constriction in the apex.

== Species ==
As of August 2022 it contains thirteen species, found in South America:

- Homoeomma brasilianum (Chamberlin, 1917) – Brazil
- Homoeomma chilense Montenegro & Aguilera, 2018 – Chile
- Homoeomma elegans (Gerschman & Schiapelli, 1958) – Argentina
- Homoeomma familiare Bertkau, 1880 – Brazil
- Homoeomma hirsutum (Mello-Leitão, 1935) – Brazil
- Homoeomma montanum (Mello-Leitão, 1923) – Brazil
- Homoeomma nigrum (Walckenaer, 1837) – Brazil
- Homoeomma orellanai Montenegro & Aguilera, 2018 – Chile
- Homoeomma peruvianum (Chamberlin, 1916) – Peru
- Homoeomma strabo (Simon, 1892) – Colombia, Brazil
- Homoeomma stradlingi O. Pickard-Cambridge, 1881 (type) – Brazil
- Homoeomma uruguayense (Mello-Leitão, 1946) – Uruguay, Argentina
- Homoeomma villosum (Keyserling, 1891) – Brazil

=== In synonymy ===
- H. bicolor Sherwood, Gabriel & Longhorn, 2018 = Homoeomma chilense Montenegro & Aguilera, 2018
- H. cyclothorax (Mello-Leitão, 1923) = Homoeomma montanum (Mello-Leitão, 1923)
- H. moreirae (Mello-Leitão, 1923) = Homoeomma brasilianum (Chamberlin, 1917)
- H. regina (Chamberlin, 1917) = Homoeomma strabo (Simon, 1892)
- H. serratum (Gerschman & Schiapelli, 1958) = Homoeomma uruguayense (Mello-Leitão, 1946)

=== Transferred to other genera ===
- Homoeomma alcirae Gerschman & Schiapelli, 1954 → Plesiopelma alcirae
- Homoeomma humile Vellard, 1924 → Bumba humilis
- Homoeomma pictum (Pocock, 1903) → Anqasha picta
- Homoeomma simoni Soares & Camargo, 1948 → Catanduba simoni
