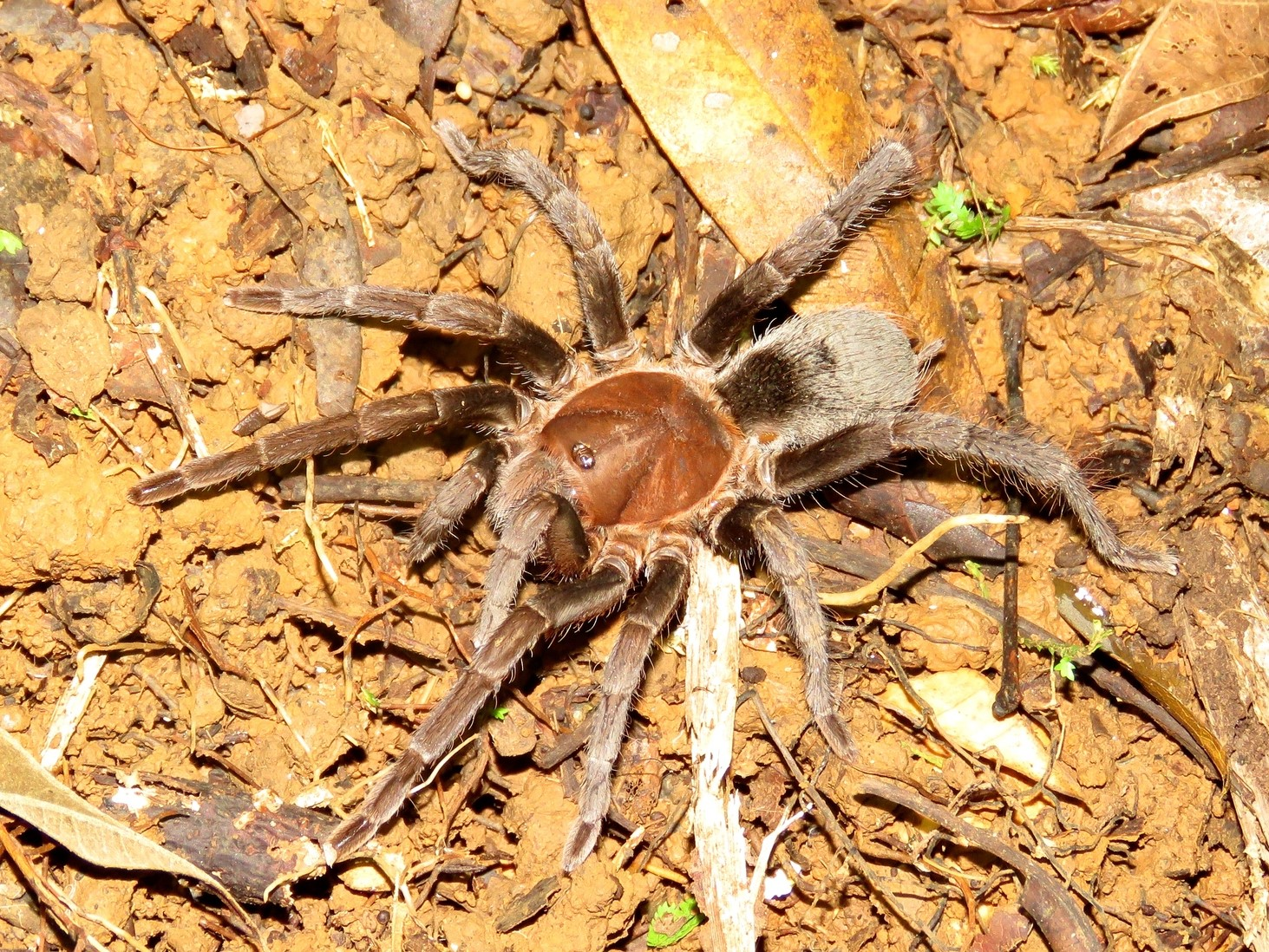
- Crypsidromus carinatus

Scientific classification
- Kingdom: Animalia
- Phylum: Arthropoda
- Subphylum: Chelicerata
- Class: Arachnida
- Order: Araneae
- Infraorder: Mygalomorphae
- Family: Theraphosidae
- Genus: Crypsidromus; Ausserer, 1871

Type species
- Crypsidromus isabellinus Ausserer, 1871

Species
- 8, see text

Synonyms
- Proshapalopus Mello-Leitão, 1923

= Crypsidromus =

Genus of spiders

Crypsidromus is a genus of tarantulas. It was first described by Anton Ausserer in 1871.

== Species ==
As of January 2024 it contains eight species:

- Crypsidromus brevibulbus Valerio, 1980 — Costa Rica
- Crypsidromus carinatus Valerio, 1980 — Costa Rica
- Crypsidromus icecu Valerio, 1980 — Costa Rica
- Crypsidromus isabellinus Ausserer, 1871 (type) — Brazil
- Crypsidromus multicuspidatus (Mello-Leitão, 1929) — Brazil
- Crypsidromus nondescriptus (Mello-Leitão, 1926) — Brazil
- Crypsidromus puriscal Valerio, 1980 — Costa Rica
- Crypsidromus rubitarsus Valerio, 1980 — Costa Rica
