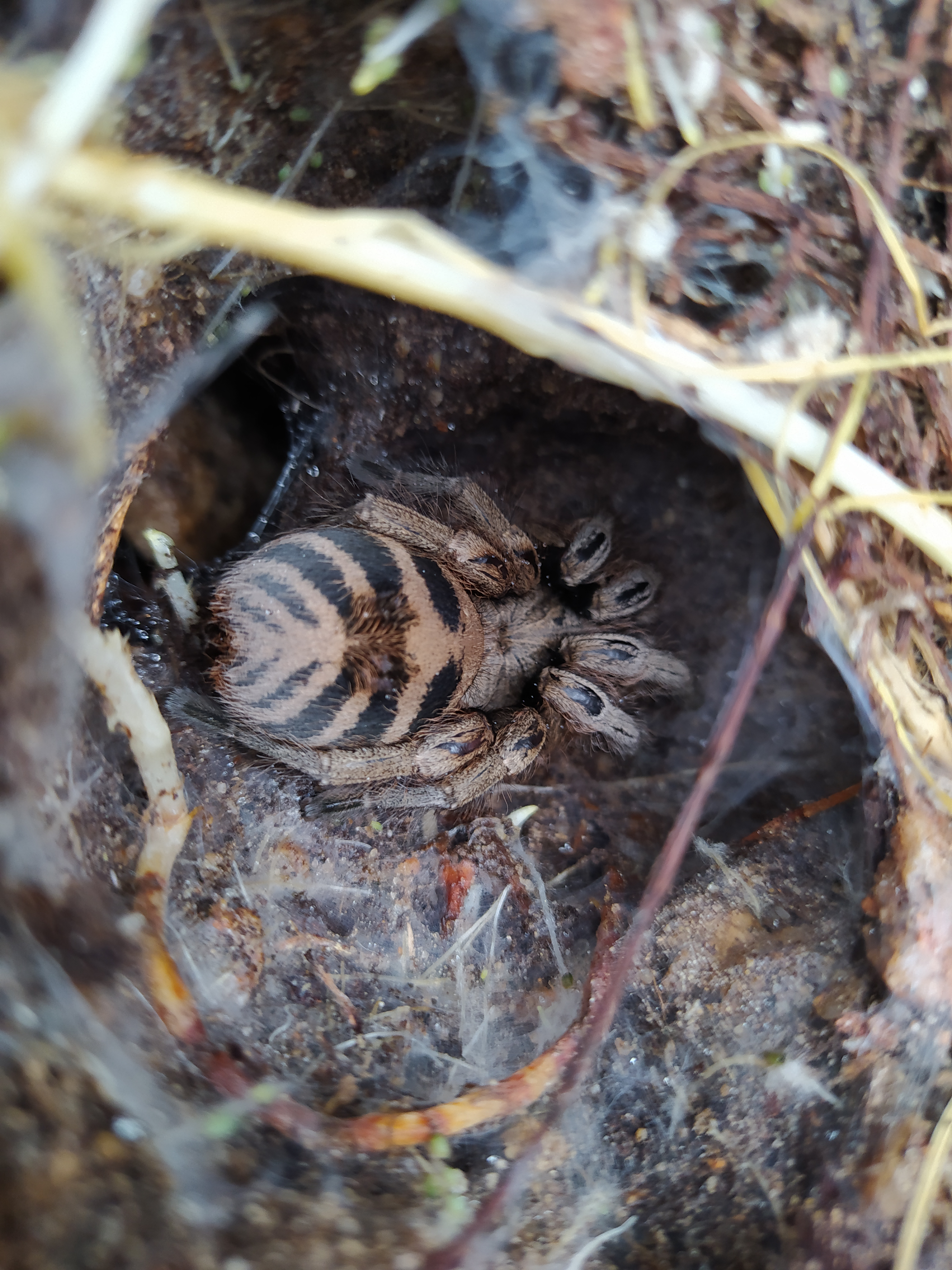

Scientific classification
- Kingdom: Animalia
- Phylum: Arthropoda
- Subphylum: Chelicerata
- Class: Arachnida
- Order: Araneae
- Infraorder: Mygalomorphae
- Family: Theraphosidae
- Genus: Anqasha; Sherwood & Gabriel, 2022
- Species: A. picta

Binomial name
- Anqasha picta (Pocock, 1903)

= Anqasha =

Genus of spider

Anqasha is a monotypic genus of Peruvian tarantulas, containing one species, Anqasha picta, first described by Danniella Sherwood and Ray Gabriel in 2022. The type species was initially described under the name Hapalopus pictus in 1903 by Reginald Innes Pocock, but was later moved to the Homoeomma genus, until finally becoming Anqasha. Its name comes from the Quechuan word for blue, "anqash".

== Description ==
Preserved in alcohol its coloration is brown, with a faded black patterning in the dorsal and lateral areas of the opisthosoma. Though in living populations both color and pattern may differ slightly, as long term immersion in alcohol may cause fading.

=== Diagnosis ===
They can be distinguished from all other similar species and genera by the palpal bulb and spermatheca shape and the black banding on the dorsal and lateral opisthosoma.

== Habitat ==
They are found in Cordillera Blanca, Peru, which has a tropical savanah climate the average temperature of this area is 11 °C, with average yearly rainfall of roughly 2400 mm. It is home to plants such as the Kalua kalua, Quenual, and Atasuku. Animals such as the Pichuychanka, the Condor and the Comadreja.
