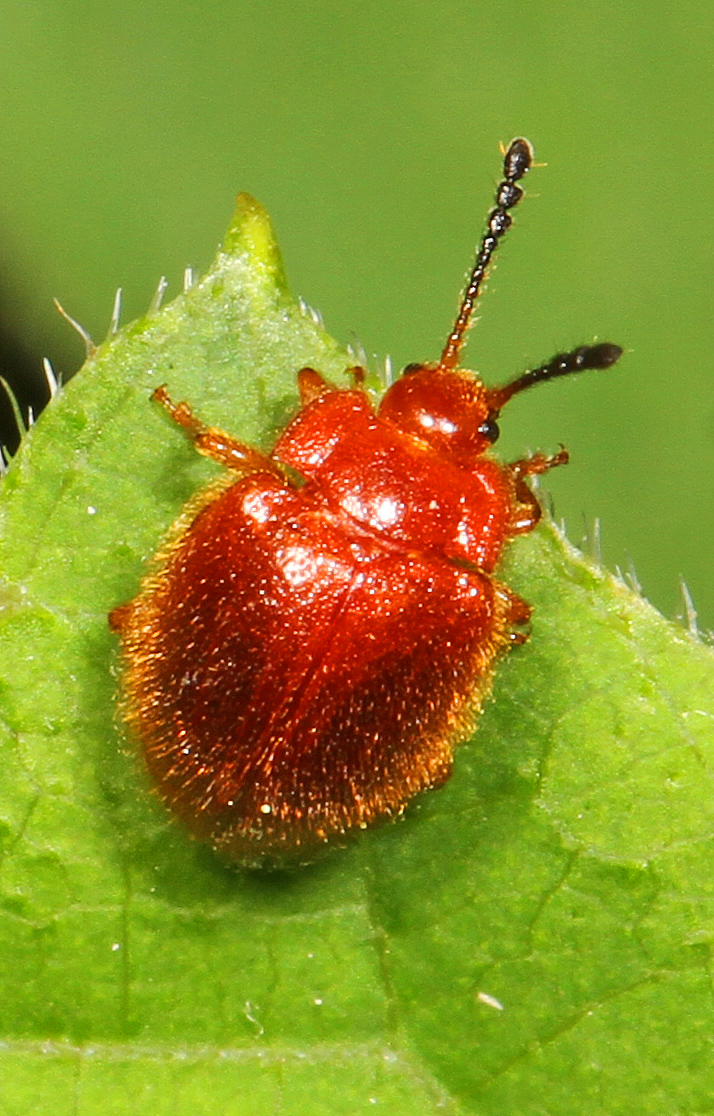
- Stenotarsus blatchleyi, Virginia
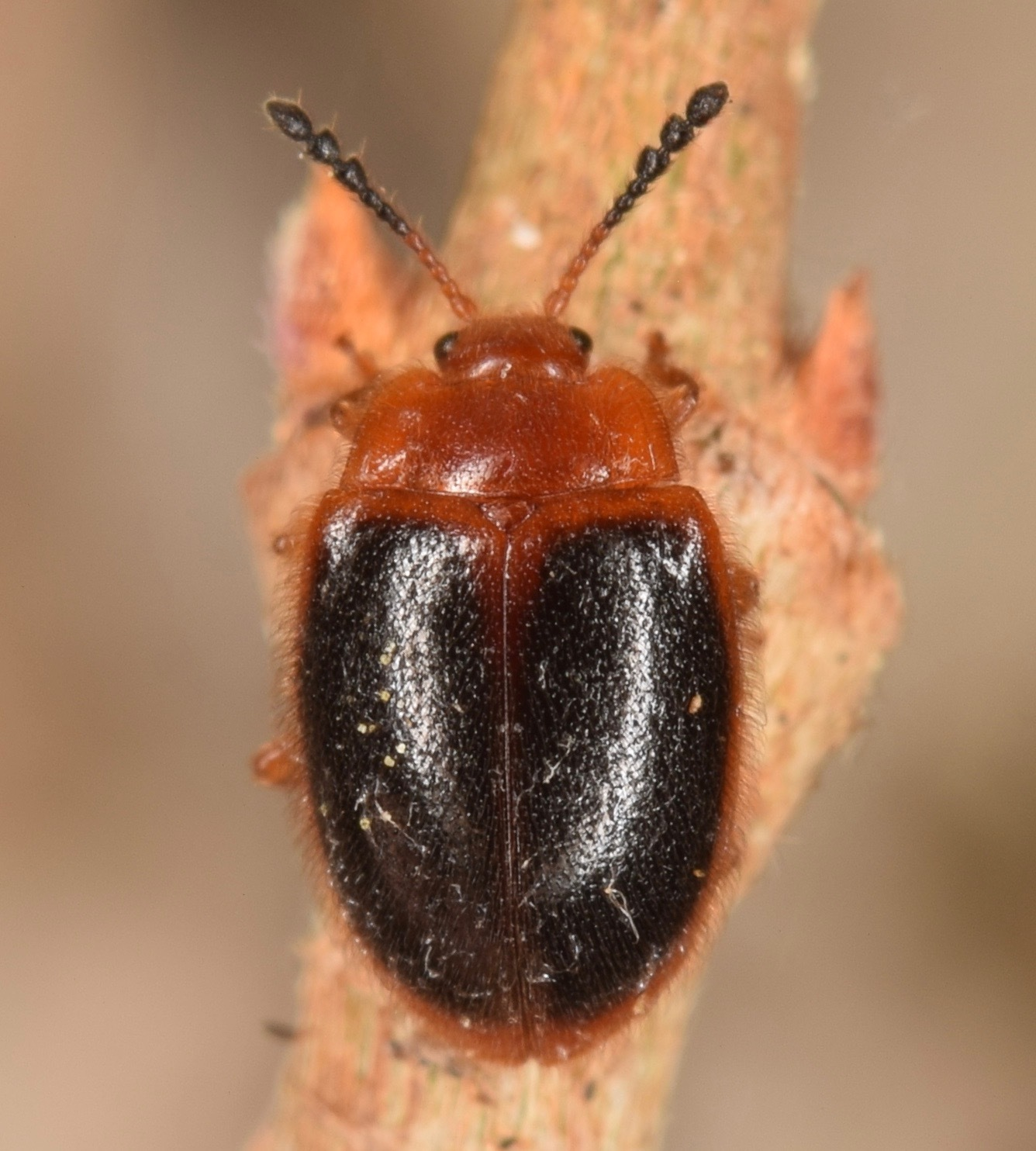
- Stenotarsus hispidus, United States

Scientific classification
- Kingdom: Animalia
- Phylum: Arthropoda
- Clade: Pancrustacea
- Class: Insecta
- Order: Coleoptera
- Suborder: Polyphaga
- Infraorder: Cucujiformia
- Family: Endomychidae
- Subfamily: Endomychinae
- Genus: Stenotarsus; Perty, 1832

= Stenotarsus =

Genus of beetles

Stenotarsus is a genus of handsome fungus beetles belonging to the family Endomychidae.

== Selected species ==
The following species are some of those belonging to the genus Stenotarsus:

- Stenotarsus affaber Boheman, 1840
- Stenotarsus aokii Chujo, 1942
- Stenotarsus atripennis Strohecker
- Stenotarsus blatchleyi Walton, 1928
- Stenotarsus brevicollis Perty, 1832
- Stenotarsus chujoi Strohecker, 1957
- Stenotarsus circumdatus Gerstaecker, 1858
- Stenotarsus cortesi Arriaga-Varela, Zaragoza-Caballero, Tomaszewska & Navarrete-Heredia, 2013
- Stenotarsus discipennis Gorham, 1890
- Stenotarsus exiguus Gorham
- Stenotarsus flavago Gorham, 1873
- Stenotarsus flavipes Heller, 1916
- Stenotarsus flavomaculatus Strohecker
- Stenotarsus flavoscapularis Strohecker
- Stenotarsus globosus Guérin-Méneville, 1857
- Stenotarsus guatemalae Arrow
- Stenotarsus hispidus (Herbst, 1799)
- Stenotarsus incisus
- Stenotarsus kafkai Arriaga-Varela, Zaragoza-Caballero, Tomaszewska & Navarrete-Heredia, 2013
- Stenotarsus kurosai
- Stenotarsus latipes Arrow, 1920
- Stenotarsus lemniscatus Gorham
- Stenotarsus lombardeaui Perroud, 1864
- Stenotarsus marginalis Arrow, 1920
- Stenotarsus mesoamericanus Arriaga-Varela, Zaragoza-Caballero, Tomaszewska & Navarrete-Heredia, 2013
- Stenotarsus mexicanus Arriaga-Varela, Zaragoza-Caballero, Tomaszewska & Navarrete-Heredia, 2013
- Stenotarsus militaris Gerstaecker, 1858
- Stenotarsus molgorae
- Stenotarsus monrovius Strohecker
- Stenotarsus monterrosoi
- Stenotarsus nakanoshimensis
- Stenotarsus nigricans Gorham
- Stenotarsus nigricollis Gorham, 1873
- Stenotarsus nigricornis Gerstäcker, 1857
- Stenotarsus oblongulus Gorham
- Stenotarsus obtusus Gerstäcker, 1858
- Stenotarsus orbicularis Gerstaecker
- Stenotarsus oshimanus
- Stenotarsus ovalis Arrow
- Stenotarsus parallelicornis
- Stenotarsus pilatei Gorham, 1873
- Stenotarsus politus Strohecker
- Stenotarsus pusillus Gerstäcker, 1858
- Stenotarsus raramuri Arriaga-Varela, Zaragoza-Caballero, Tomaszewska & Navarrete-Heredia, 2013
- Stenotarsus rubrocinctus Gerstaecker, 1858
- Stenotarsus rulfoi
- Stenotarsus russatus Gorham, 1874
- Stenotarsus ryukyuensis Chujo & Kiuchi, 1974
- Stenotarsus sallaei Gorham
- Stenotarsus sallei Gorham, 1873
- Stenotarsus secticollis Strohecker, 1974
- Stenotarsus shockleyi
- Stenotarsus signatus Boheman, 1840
- Stenotarsus smithi Gorham, 1890
- Stenotarsus solidus Casey
- Stenotarsus spiropenis
- Stenotarsus tarsalis Gorham, 1890
- Stenotarsus thoracicus Gorham, 1890
- Stenotarsus validicornis Gerstaecker, 1858
- Stenotarsus ventricosus Gerstäcker, 1858
- Stenotarsus yoshionis Chujo, 1938
