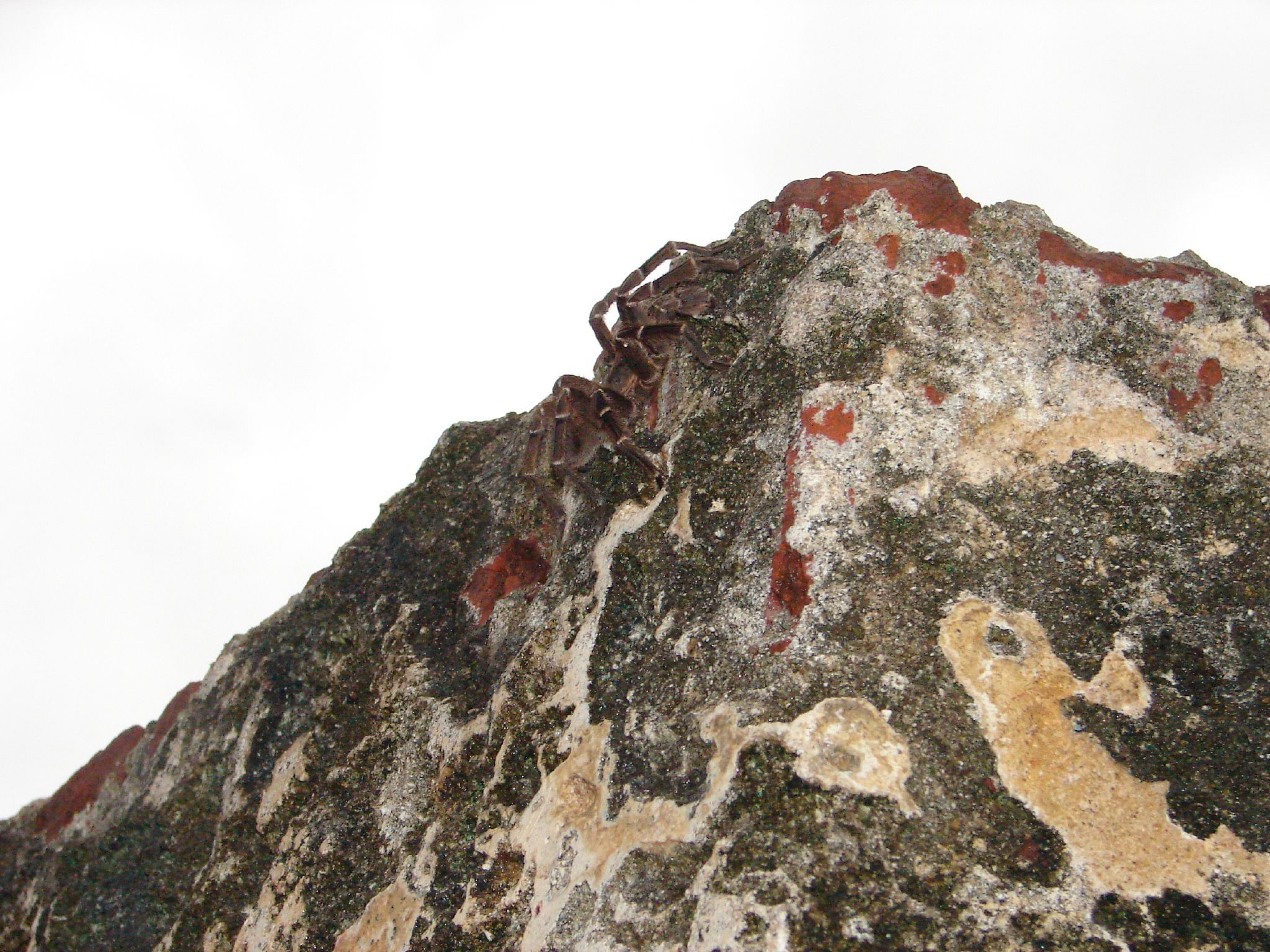
- Cyrtopholis portoricae

Scientific classification
- Kingdom: Animalia
- Phylum: Arthropoda
- Subphylum: Chelicerata
- Class: Arachnida
- Order: Araneae
- Infraorder: Mygalomorphae
- Family: Theraphosidae
- Genus: Cyrtopholis; Simon, 1892

Type species
- C. cursor (Ausserer, 1875)

Species
- 22, see text

Synonyms
- Cyrtosternum Ausserer, 1875

= Cyrtopholis =

Genus of spiders

Cyrtopholis is a genus of tarantulas that was first described by Eugène Louis Simon in 1892.

== Diagnosis ==
This genus can be distinguished by being found in the Caribbean, and by the presence of claviform stridulatory hairs on the trochanter of the pedipalps and the legs I. They also have type 1 and 3 urticating hairs on the abdomen. The spermatheca of females is formed by 2 long receptacles with no fusion at the base.

== Species ==
As of May 2022 it contains twenty-two species, found in the Caribbean and South America:

- Cyrtopholis agilis Pocock, 1903 – Hispaniola
- Cyrtopholis anacanta Franganillo, 1935 – Cuba
- Cyrtopholis annectans Chamberlin, 1917 – Barbados
- Cyrtopholis bartholomaei (Latreille, 1832) – St. Thomas, Antigua
- Cyrtopholis bonhotei (F. O. Pickard-Cambridge, 1901) – Bahama Is.
- Cyrtopholis bryantae Rudloff, 1995 – Cuba
- Cyrtopholis culebrae (Petrunkevitch, 1929) – Puerto Rico
- Cyrtopholis cursor (Ausserer, 1875) (type) – Hispaniola
- Cyrtopholis femoralis Pocock, 1903 – Montserrat
- Cyrtopholis flavostriata Schmidt, 1995 – Virgin Is.
- Cyrtopholis gibbosa Franganillo, 1936 – Cuba
- Cyrtopholis innocua (Ausserer, 1871) – Cuba
- Cyrtopholis intermedia (Ausserer, 1875) – South America
- Cyrtopholis ischnoculiformis (Franganillo, 1926) – Cuba
- Cyrtopholis jamaicola Strand, 1908 – Jamaica
- Cyrtopholis major (Franganillo, 1926) – Cuba
- Cyrtopholis obsoleta (Franganillo, 1935) – Cuba
- Cyrtopholis plumosa Franganillo, 1931 – Cuba
- Cyrtopholis portoricae Chamberlin, 1917 – Puerto Rico
- Cyrtopholis ramsi Rudloff, 1995 – Cuba
- Cyrtopholis regibbosa Rudloff, 1994 – Cuba
- Cyrtopholis unispina Franganillo, 1926 – Cuba

=== In synonymy ===
- C. debilis Franganillo, 1931 = Cyrtopholis unispina
- C. debilis Franganillo, 1931 = Cyrtopholis major

=== Nomen dubium ===
- Cyrtopholis meridionalis (Keyserling, 1891) – Brazil

=== Nomen nudum ===
- Cyrtopholis respina Franganillo, 1935 – Cuba

=== Transferred to other genera ===
- C. angustata Kraus, 1955 → Stichoplastoris angustatus
- C. cyanea Rudloff, 1994 → Citharacanthus cyaneus
- C. longistyla Kraus, 1955 → Stichoplastoris longistylus
- C. lycosoides Tullgren, 1905 → Acanthoscurria theraphosoides
- C. media Chamberlin, 1917 → Nesipelma medium
- C. palmarum Schiapelli & Gerschman, 1945 → Umbyquyra palmarum
- C. pernix (Ausserer, 1875) → Hemirrhagus pernix
- C. sargi Strand, 1907 → Citharacanthus sargi (Nomen dubium)
- C. schmidti Rudloff, 1996 → Umbyquyra schmidti
- C. schusterae Kraus, 1955 → Stichoplastoris schusterae
- C. zorodes Mello-Leitão, 1923 → Acanthoscurria gomesiana
