= Acentroscelus =

Scientific classification
- Kingdom: Animalia
- Phylum: Arthropoda
- Subphylum: Chelicerata
- Class: Arachnida
- Order: Araneae
- Infraorder: Araneomorphae
- Family: Thomisidae
- Genus: Acentroscelus; Simon, 1886

Type species
- A. albipes Simon, 1886

Species
- 11, see text

Synonyms
- Whittickius Mello-Leitão, 1940

Genus of spiders

Acentroscelus is a genus of South American crab spiders that was first described by Eugène Louis Simon in 1886. It is a senior synonym of Whittickius.

== Species ==
As of June 2020 it contains eleven species, found in Guyana, Brazil, Peru, Argentina, and French Guiana:

- Acentroscelus albipes Simon, 1886 (type) – Brazil
- Acentroscelus gallinii Mello-Leitão, 1943 – Argentina
- Acentroscelus granulosus Mello-Leitão, 1929 – Brazil
- Acentroscelus guianensis (Taczanowski, 1872) – Peru, French Guiana
- Acentroscelus muricatus Mello-Leitão, 1947 – Brazil
- Acentroscelus nigrianus Mello-Leitão, 1929 – Brazil
- Acentroscelus peruvianus (Keyserling, 1880) – Peru
- Acentroscelus ramboi Mello-Leitão, 1943 – Brazil
- Acentroscelus secundus Mello-Leitão, 1929 – Brazil
- Acentroscelus singularis (Mello-Leitão, 1940) – Guyana
- Acentroscelus versicolor Soares, 1942 – Brazil

== See also ==
- List of Thomisidae species
