= Dubiaranea =

Scientific classification
- Kingdom: Animalia
- Phylum: Arthropoda
- Subphylum: Chelicerata
- Class: Arachnida
- Order: Araneae
- Infraorder: Araneomorphae
- Family: Linyphiidae
- Genus: Dubiaranea; Mello-Leitão, 1943

Type species
- D. argenteovittata Mello-Leitão, 1943

Species
- 100, see text

Synonyms
- Hormembolus Millidge, 1985; Paranesticus Mello-Leitão, 1944

Genus of spiders

Dubiaranea is a genus of dwarf spiders that was first described by Cândido Firmino de Mello-Leitão in 1943.

== Species ==
As of May 2019 it contains one hundred species found throughout South America, except one found on Borneo:

- D. abjecta Millidge, 1991 – Ecuador, Peru
- D. abundans Millidge, 1991 – Peru
- D. affinis Millidge, 1991 – Ecuador
- D. albodorsata Millidge, 1991 – Colombia
- D. albolineata Millidge, 1991 – Peru
- D. amoena Millidge, 1991 – Peru
- D. argentata Millidge, 1991 – Bolivia
- D. argenteovittata Mello-Leitão, 1943 (type) – Brazil
- D. atra Millidge, 1991 – Bolivia
- D. atriceps Millidge, 1991 – Peru
- D. atripalpis Millidge, 1991 – Venezuela
- D. atrolineata Millidge, 1991 – Colombia
- D. aureola Millidge, 1991 – Peru
- D. bacata Millidge, 1991 – Peru
- D. brevis Millidge, 1991 – Bolivia
- D. caeca Millidge, 1991 – Venezuela
- D. caledonica (Millidge, 1985) – Chile
- D. castanea Millidge, 1991 – Peru
- D. cekalovici (Millidge, 1985) – Chile
- D. cerea (Millidge, 1985) – Chile
- D. colombiana Millidge, 1991 – Colombia
- D. concors Millidge, 1991 – Colombia
- D. congruens Millidge, 1991 – Ecuador
- D. crebra Millidge, 1991 – Colombia, Venezuela, Ecuador, Peru
- D. decora Millidge, 1991 – Peru
- D. decurtata Millidge, 1991 – Bolivia
- D. deelemanae Millidge, 1995 – Borneo
- D. difficilis (Mello-Leitão, 1944) – Argentina
- D. discolor Millidge, 1991 – Colombia
- D. distincta (Nicolet, 1849) – Chile
- D. distracta Millidge, 1991 – Colombia
- D. elegans Millidge, 1991 – Peru
- D. fagicola Millidge, 1991 – Chile
- D. falcata (Millidge, 1985) – Chile
- D. festiva (Millidge, 1985) – Chile
- D. fruticola Millidge, 1991 – Peru
- D. fulgens (Millidge, 1985) – Chile
- D. fulvolineata Millidge, 1991 – Peru
- D. furva Millidge, 1991 – Peru
- D. fusca Millidge, 1991 – Peru
- D. gilva Millidge, 1991 – Colombia
- D. gloriosa Millidge, 1991 – Colombia
- D. grandicula Millidge, 1991 – Peru
- D. gregalis Millidge, 1991 – Peru
- D. habilis Millidge, 1991 – Ecuador
- D. inquilina (Millidge, 1985) – Brazil
- D. insignita Millidge, 1991 – Peru, Bolivia
- D. insulana Millidge, 1991 – Chile (Juan Fernandez Is.)
- D. insulsa Millidge, 1991 – Ecuador
- D. lepida Millidge, 1991 – Peru
- D. levii Millidge, 1991 – Brazil
- D. longa Millidge, 1991 – Peru
- D. longiscapa (Millidge, 1985) – Chile
- D. luctuosa Millidge, 1991 – Peru
- D. lugubris Millidge, 1991 – Ecuador
- D. maculata (Millidge, 1985) – Chile
- D. manufera (Millidge, 1985) – Chile
- D. margaritata Millidge, 1991 – Colombia, Venezuela
- D. media Millidge, 1991 – Venezuela
- D. mediocris Millidge, 1991 – Peru
- D. melanocephala Millidge, 1991 – Peru
- D. melica Millidge, 1991 – Peru
- D. mirabilis Millidge, 1991 – Ecuador
- D. modica Millidge, 1991 – Ecuador
- D. morata Millidge, 1991 – Ecuador
- D. nivea Millidge, 1991 – Bolivia
- D. opaca Millidge, 1991 – Peru
- D. orba Millidge, 1991 – Ecuador
- D. ornata Millidge, 1991 – Colombia
- D. penai (Millidge, 1985) – Chile
- D. persimilis Millidge, 1991 – Ecuador
- D. procera Millidge, 1991 – Peru
- D. propinquua (Millidge, 1985) – Chile
- D. propria Millidge, 1991 – Colombia
- D. proxima Millidge, 1991 – Ecuador
- D. pulchra Millidge, 1991 – Venezuela
- D. pullata Millidge, 1991 – Peru
- D. remota Millidge, 1991 – Argentina
- D. rufula Millidge, 1991 – Peru
- D. saucia Millidge, 1991 – Brazil
- D. setigera Millidge, 1991 – Colombia
- D. signifera Millidge, 1991 – Bolivia
- D. silvae Millidge, 1991 – Peru
- D. silvicola Millidge, 1991 – Colombia
- D. similis Millidge, 1991 – Chile
- D. solita Millidge, 1991 – Colombia
- D. speciosa Millidge, 1991 – Peru
- D. stellata (Millidge, 1985) – Chile
- D. subtilis (Keyserling, 1886) – Peru
- D. teres Millidge, 1991 – Ecuador
- D. tridentata Millidge, 1993 – Peru
- D. tristis (Mello-Leitão, 1941) – Argentina
- D. truncata Millidge, 1991 – Peru
- D. turbidula (Keyserling, 1886) – Brazil, Peru
- D. usitata Millidge, 1991 – Colombia
- D. varia Millidge, 1991 – Peru
- D. variegata Millidge, 1991 – Colombia
- D. versicolor Millidge, 1991 – Colombia, Ecuador, Peru
- D. veterana Millidge, 1991 – Ecuador
- D. vetusta Millidge, 1991 – Ecuador
