= Molinaranea =

Molinaranea Temporal range: Neogene–present

Scientific classification
- Kingdom: Animalia
- Phylum: Arthropoda
- Subphylum: Chelicerata
- Class: Arachnida
- Order: Araneae
- Infraorder: Araneomorphae
- Family: Araneidae
- Genus: Molinaranea; Mello-Leitão, 1940

Type species
- M. magellanica (Walckenaer, 1847)

Species
- 7, see text

Genus of spiders

Molinaranea is a genus of South American orb-weaver spiders first described by Cândido Firmino de Mello-Leitão in 1940.

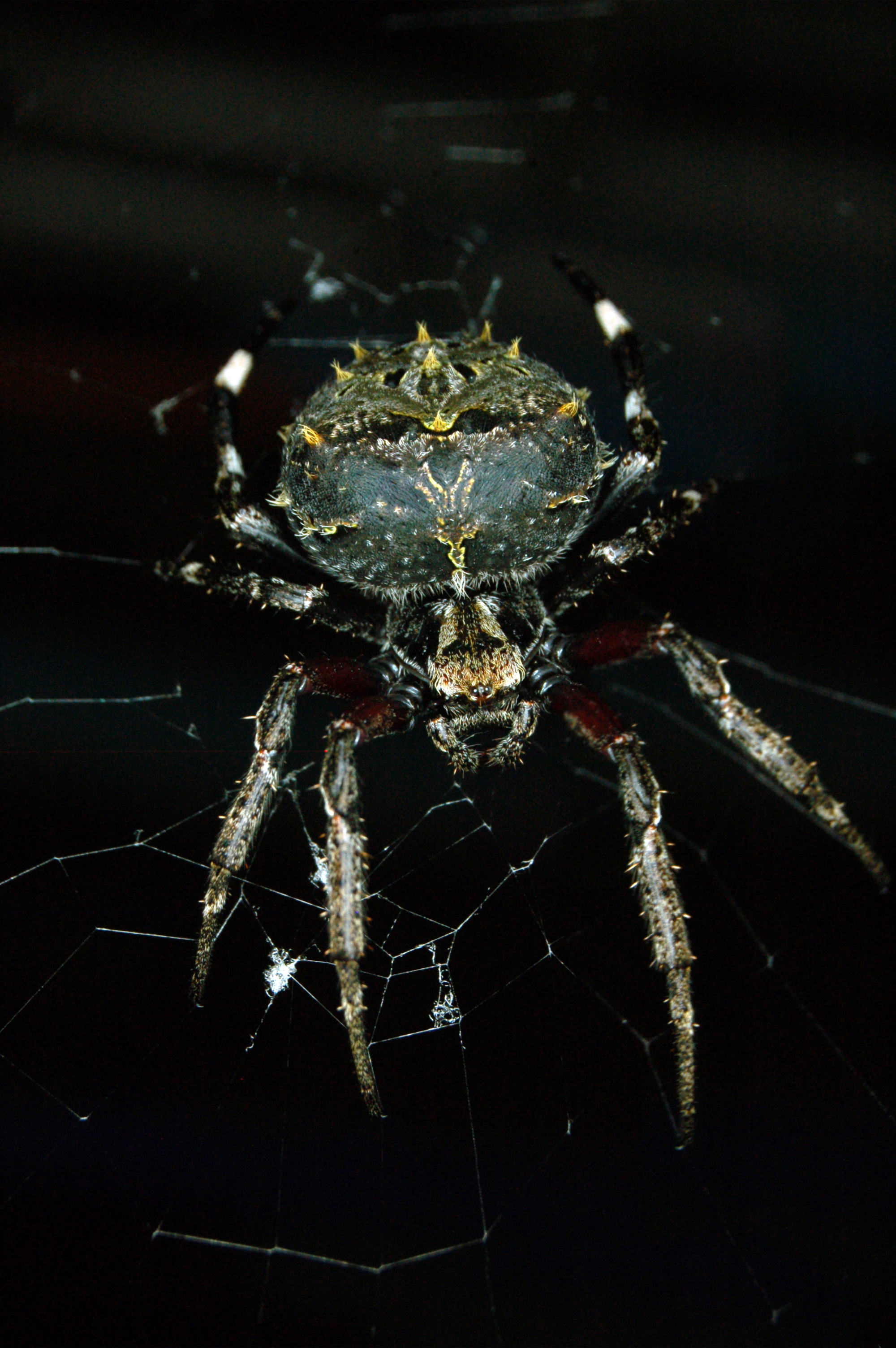

== Species ==
As of November 2026 it contains seven species:

- Molinaranea clymene (Nicolet, 1849) – Chile, Argentina
- Molinaranea fernandez Levi, 2001 – Juan Fernandez Islands
- Molinaranea magellanica (Walckenaer, 1847) – Chile, Argentina, Juan Fernandez Islands, Falkland Islands
- Molinaranea mammifera (Tullgren, 1902) – Chile
- Molinaranea phaethontis (Simon, 1896) – Chile, Argentina
- Molinaranea surculorum (Simon, 1896) – Chile
- Molinaranea vildav Levi, 2001 – Chile
