= Scopocira =

Scientific classification
- Kingdom: Animalia
- Phylum: Arthropoda
- Subphylum: Chelicerata
- Class: Arachnida
- Order: Araneae
- Infraorder: Araneomorphae
- Family: Salticidae
- Subfamily: Salticinae
- Genus: Scopocira; Simon, 1900

Type species
- S. dentichelis Simon, 1900

Species
- 15, see text

Synonyms
- Paranaia Mello-Leitão, 1941; Suaruna Mello-Leitão, 1945

Genus of spiders

Scopocira is a genus of jumping spiders that was first described by Eugène Louis Simon in 1900.

== Species ==
As of August 2019 it contains fifteen species, found in Central and South America and in the Caribbean:

- Scopocira abaporu Costa & Ruiz, 2014 – Trinidad, Bolivia
- Scopocira albertoi Galvis, 2015 – Colombia
- Scopocira bicornia Costa & Ruiz, 2014 – Brazil
- Scopocira carinata Crane, 1945 – Guyana, Trinidad and Tobago, Brazil
- Scopocira cepa Costa & Ruiz, 2014 – Brazil
- Scopocira crotalica Costa & Ruiz, 2014 – Colombia, Brazil
- Scopocira cyrili Costa & Ruiz, 2014 – Guyana, French Guiana
- Scopocira dentichelis Simon, 1900 (type) – Costa Rica, Panama, Colombia, Venezuela, Trinidad and Tobago, Brazil
- Scopocira fuscimana (Mello-Leitão, 1941) – Brazil
- Scopocira histrio Simon, 1900 – Ecuador, Suriname, Brazil, Argentina
- Scopocira kunai Costa & Ruiz, 2014 – Trinidad, Brazil
- Scopocira melanops (Taczanowski, 1871) – Brazil
- Scopocira pterodactyla Costa & Ruiz, 2014 – Brazil
- Scopocira sciosciae Costa & Ruiz, 2014 – Brazil
- Scopocira tenella Simon, 1900 – Colombia, French Guiana, Brazil
