= Semorina =

Scientific classification
- Kingdom: Animalia
- Phylum: Arthropoda
- Subphylum: Chelicerata
- Class: Arachnida
- Order: Araneae
- Infraorder: Araneomorphae
- Family: Salticidae
- Subfamily: Salticinae
- Genus: Semorina; Simon, 1901

Type species
- S. seminuda Simon, 1901

Species
- 5, see text

Genus of spiders

Semorina is a genus of South American jumping spiders that was first described by Eugène Louis Simon in 1901.

== Species ==
As of August 2019 it contains five species, found only in Argentina and Venezuela:

- Semorina brachychelyne Crane, 1949 – Venezuela
- Semorina iris Simon, 1901 – Venezuela
- Semorina lineata Mello-Leitão, 1945 – Argentina
- Semorina megachelyne Crane, 1949 – Venezuela
- Semorina seminuda Simon, 1901 (type) – Venezuela
