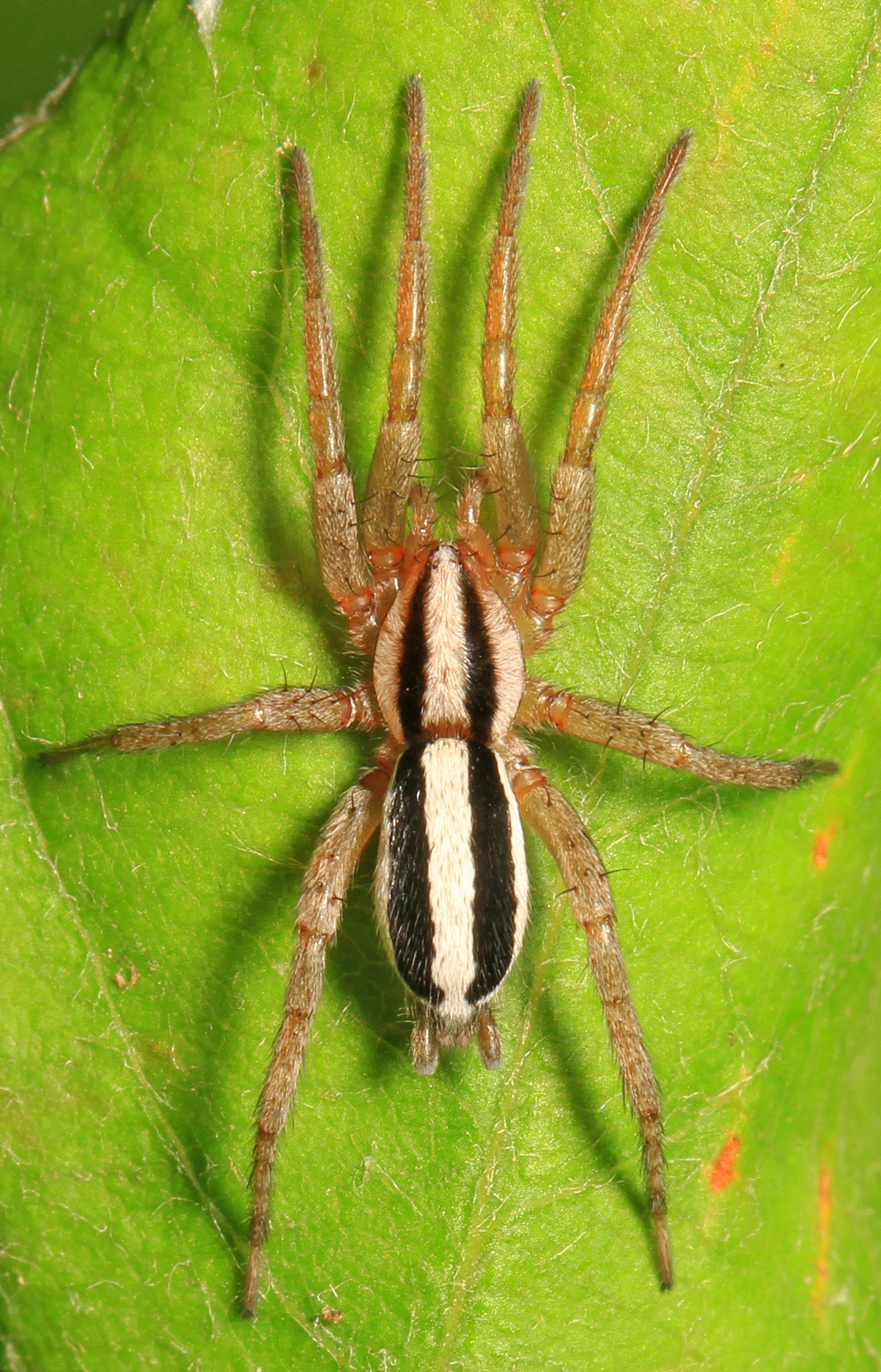
- C. bilineata from Virginia

Scientific classification
- Kingdom: Animalia
- Phylum: Arthropoda
- Subphylum: Chelicerata
- Class: Arachnida
- Order: Araneae
- Infraorder: Araneomorphae
- Family: Gnaphosidae
- Genus: Cesonia; Simon, 1893

Type species
- C. bilineata (Hentz, 1847)

Species
- 31, see text

Synonyms
- Eilicina Bryant, 1940

= Cesonia =

Genus of spiders

Cesonia is a genus of ground spiders that was first described by Eugène Simon in 1893.

== Species ==
As of May 2019 it contains thirty-one species:

- Cesonia aspida Chatzaki, 2002 – Greece (Crete), Turkey
- Cesonia bilineata (Hentz, 1847) (type) – North America
- Cesonia bixleri Platnick & Shadab, 1980 – USA
- Cesonia boca Platnick & Shadab, 1980 – Panama
- Cesonia bryantae Platnick & Shadab, 1980 – Jamaica
- Cesonia cana Platnick & Shadab, 1980 – Jamaica
- Cesonia cerralvo Platnick & Shadab, 1980 – Mexico
- Cesonia chickeringi Platnick & Shadab, 1980 – Jamaica
- Cesonia cincta (Banks, 1909) – Cuba
- Cesonia classica Chamberlin, 1924 – California, Nevada, Arizona, Mexico
- Cesonia coala Platnick & Shadab, 1980 – Mexico
- Cesonia cuernavaca Platnick & Shadab, 1980 – Mexico
- Cesonia desecheo Platnick & Shadab, 1980 – Puerto Rico, Virgin Is.
- Cesonia ditta Platnick & Shadab, 1980 – Dominican Rep.
- Cesonia elegans (Simon, 1892) – St. Vincent, Dominica
- Cesonia gertschi Platnick & Shadab, 1980 – Southern Arizona, Mexico
- Cesonia grisea (Banks, 1914) – Cuba
- Cesonia irvingi (Mello-Leitão, 1944) – Southern tip of Florida, Bahamas, Cuba
- Cesonia iviei Platnick & Shadab, 1980 – Mexico
- Cesonia josephus (Chamberlin & Gertsch, 1940) – USA
- Cesonia lacertosa Chickering, 1949 – Panama
- Cesonia leechi Platnick & Shadab, 1980 – Mexico
- Cesonia lugubris (O. Pickard-Cambridge, 1896) – Mexico, Honduras
- Cesonia maculata Platnick & Shadab, 1980 – St. Kitts and Nevis
- Cesonia nadleri Platnick & Shadab, 1980 – Hispaniola
- Cesonia notata Chickering, 1949 – Mexico, Panama
- Cesonia pudica Chickering, 1949 – Panama
- Cesonia rothi Platnick & Shadab, 1980 – Southern California
- Cesonia sincera Gertsch & Mulaik, 1936 – USA, Mexico
- Cesonia trivittata Banks, 1898 – Southern California, Mexico
- Cesonia ubicki Platnick & Shadab, 1980 – Southern Arizona, Mexico
