= Stenodeza =

Scientific classification
- Kingdom: Animalia
- Phylum: Arthropoda
- Subphylum: Chelicerata
- Class: Arachnida
- Order: Araneae
- Infraorder: Araneomorphae
- Family: Salticidae
- Subfamily: incertae sedis
- Genus: Stenodeza; Simon, 1900

Type species
- S. acuminata Simon, 1900

Species
- S. acuminata Simon, 1900 – Brazil; S. fallax Mello-Leitão, 1917 – Brazil; S. foestiva Mello-Leitão, 1944 – Argentina

Genus of spiders

Stenodeza is a genus of South American jumping spiders that was first described by Eugène Louis Simon in 1900. As of August 2019 it contains only three species, found only in Argentina and Brazil: S. acuminata, S. fallax, and S. foestiva. The taxonomic relationships of the genus within the family Salticidae are uncertain.
