= Arachnomura =

Scientific classification
- Kingdom: Animalia
- Phylum: Arthropoda
- Subphylum: Chelicerata
- Class: Arachnida
- Order: Araneae
- Infraorder: Araneomorphae
- Family: Salticidae
- Subfamily: Salticinae
- Genus: Arachnomura; Mello-Leitão, 1917

Type species
- A. hieroglyphica Mello-Leitão, 1917

Species
- A. hieroglyphica Mello-Leitão, 1917 – Brazil; A. querandi Bustamante & Ruiz, 2017 – Argentina

Genus of spiders

Arachnomura is a genus of South American jumping spiders that was first described by Cândido Firmino de Mello-Leitão in 1917. As of June 2019 it contains only two species, found only in Argentina and Brazil: A. hieroglyphica and A. querandi.
