= Sarindoides =

Scientific classification
- Kingdom: Animalia
- Phylum: Arthropoda
- Subphylum: Chelicerata
- Class: Arachnida
- Order: Araneae
- Infraorder: Araneomorphae
- Family: Salticidae
- Genus: Sarindoides; Mello-Leitão, 1922
- Species: S. violaceus

Binomial name
- Sarindoides violaceus Mello-Leitão, 1922

Genus of spiders

Sarindoides is a monotypic genus of Brazilian jumping spiders containing the single species, Sarindoides violaceus. It was first described by Cândido Firmino de Mello-Leitão in 1922, and is found only in Brazil.
