= Acanthoscurria insubtilis =

Scientific classification
- Kingdom: Animalia
- Phylum: Arthropoda
- Subphylum: Chelicerata
- Class: Arachnida
- Order: Araneae
- Infraorder: Mygalomorphae
- Family: Theraphosidae
- Genus: Acanthoscurria
- Species: A. insubtilis

Binomial name
- Acanthoscurria insubtilis Simon, 1892

Species of tarantula

Acanthoscurria insubtilis also known as the Bolivian black velvet tarantula, is a spider which was first described by Eugène Simon in 1892. It is found mainly in Bolivia, with some reports also stating in Brazil.

== Description ==
Males have a dark brown or black coloration, with pinkish hairs on the opisthosoma, carapace and legs. Females own this same coloration, though the carapace and opisthosoma are lighter. It resembles Acanthoscurria theraphosoides as the sexual organs are quite similar in structure, though it can be easily separated from it, as it owns a dark patch on the opisthosoma.

== Habitat ==
They are mainly found in the Bolivian Rainforests, and the Carrasco National Park in Bolivia. The average temperatures of this area are 24°C, with an average rainfall of 2,500mm. It can range from 280m to 4717m above sea level and is home to 638 species of vertebrates.

== Behavior ==
It is terrestrial in nature, and a very docile tarantula, with mild venom. They are surprisingly non-skittish, and will not commonly throw urticating hairs. They are primarily nocturnal, and will dig tubular burrows, reaching from 10cm to 20cm in dept.
