= Acanthoscurria natalensis =

Scientific classification
- Kingdom: Animalia
- Phylum: Arthropoda
- Subphylum: Chelicerata
- Class: Arachnida
- Order: Araneae
- Infraorder: Mygalomorphae
- Family: Theraphosidae
- Genus: Acanthoscurria
- Species: A. natalensis

Binomial name
- Acanthoscurria natalensis Chamberlin, 1917

Species of Tarantula

Acanthoscurria natalensis is a dark-brown species of ground dwelling tarantula native to the northeastern area of Brazil. This species is almost identical to the species Acanthoscurria chacoana and can be differentiated from it because A. natalensis has a longer embolus, the part of male tarantulas that transfers sperm to the females. The other difference between these species is the lesser developed keels in A. natalensis.
