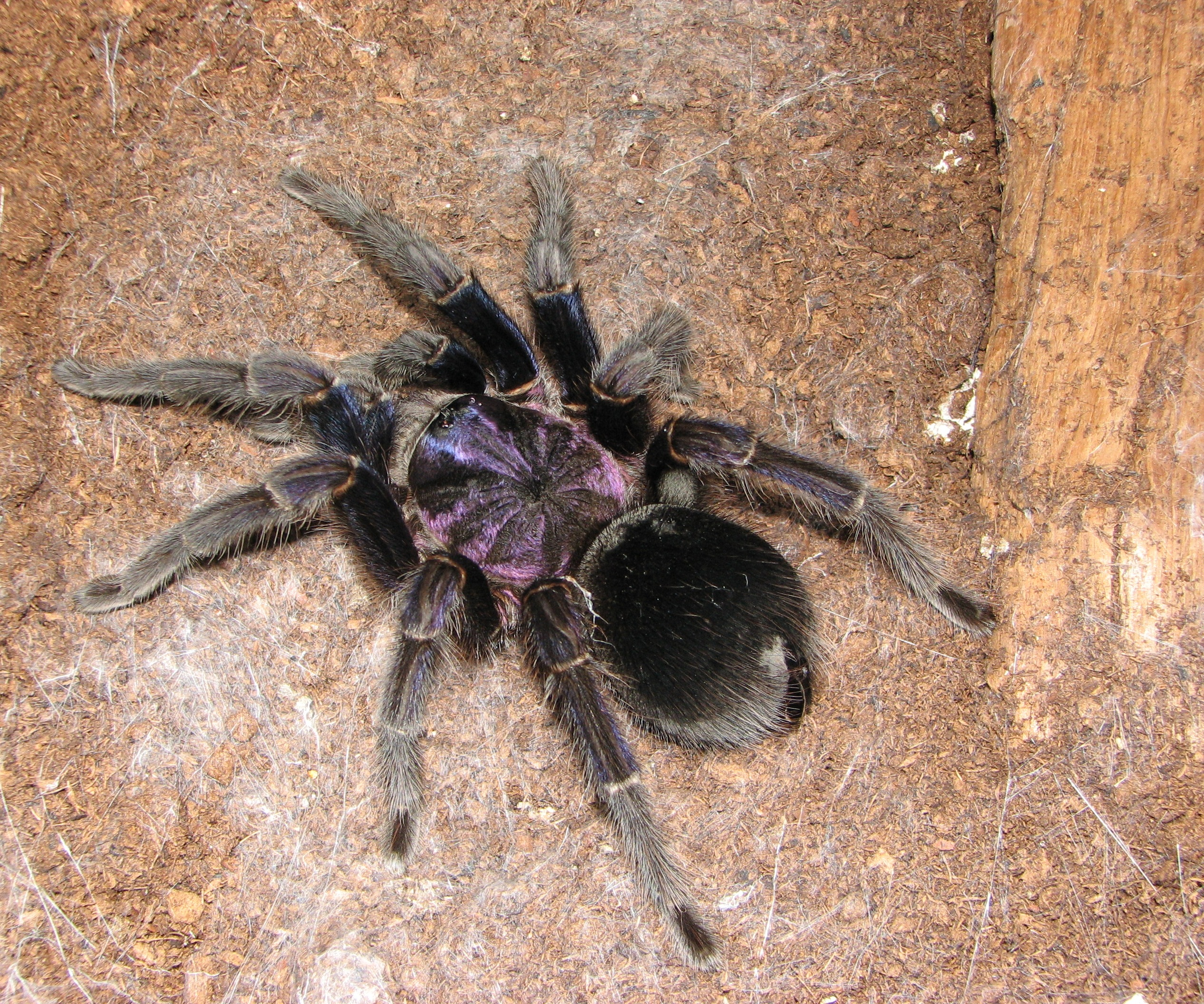
- adult female

Scientific classification
- Kingdom: Animalia
- Phylum: Arthropoda
- Subphylum: Chelicerata
- Class: Arachnida
- Order: Araneae
- Infraorder: Mygalomorphae
- Family: Theraphosidae
- Genus: Phormictopus; Pocock, 1901

Type species
- Mygale cancerides Latreille, 1806

Species
- See text.

= Phormictopus =

Genus of spiders

Phormictopus is a genus of spiders in the family Theraphosidae (tarantulas) that occurs in the West Indies, mainly Cuba and Hispaniola, with three species probably misplaced in this genus found in Brazil and Argentina.

== Description ==
Phormictopus species are quite large spiders; for example a female of Phormictus auratus had a total body length of 73 mm (2.9 in) with the longest leg (the fourth) being 74 mm (2.9 in) long. They have stridulating organs on the coxae and trochanters of the pedipalps and first pair of legs. Males have two apophyses (projections) on the tibia of the first pair of legs, and urticating hairs of type I. Females have a two-part spermatheca, and urticating hairs of types I and III.

== Taxonomy ==
The genus Phormictopus was erected by Reginald Innes Pocock in 1901. He transferred Mygale cancerides, first described by Pierre André Latreille in 1806, to his new genus as the type species. When Jan-Peter Rudloff reviewed the genus in 2008, it included 14 species. He reduced this number to seven definitely belonging to the genus, and described five more. Three species were considered misplaced in Phormictopus, but no definite alternative placement was provided. With these exclusions, the genus is probably restricted to the West Indies.

== Species ==
As of July 2022, the World Spider Catalog accepted the following species:

- Phormictopus atrichomatus Schmidt, 1991 – probably Hispaniola
- Phormictopus auratus Ortiz & Bertani, 2005 – Cuba
- Phormictopus australis Mello-Leitão, 1941 - Argentina
- Phormictopus bistriatus Rudloff, 2008 – Cuba
- Phormictopus cancerides (Latreille, 1806) (type species) – Caribbean to Brazil
- Phormictopus cautus (Ausserer, 1875) – Cuba
- Phormictopus cochleasvorax Rudloff, 2008 – Cuba
- Phormictopus cubensis Chamberlin, 1917 – Cuba
- Phormictopus fritzschei Rudloff, 2008 – Cuba
- Phormictopus jonai Rudloff, 2008 – Cuba
- Phormictopus melodermus Chamberlin, 1917 – Hispaniola
- Phormictopus platus Chamberlin, 1917 – United States or Hispaniola
- Phormictopus ribeiroi Mello-Leitão, 1923 - Brazil
- Phormictopus schepanskii Rudloff, 2008 – Cuba

=== In synonymy ===
- Phormictopus cancerides centumfocensis (Franganillo, 1926) = Phormictopus cautus
- Phormictopus cancerides tenuispinus Strand, 1906 = Phormictopus cancerides
- Phormictopus dubius (Chamberlin, 1917) = Phormictopus cubensis
- Phormictopus nesiotes Chamberlin, 1917 = Phormictopus cautus
- Phormictopus piephoi Schmidt, 2003 = Phormictopus cubensis

=== Nomina dubia ===
Phormictopus brasiliensis Strand, 1907 - Brazil

Phormictopus hirsutus Strand, 1907 - Venezuela

=== Transferred to other genera ===
Phormictopus intermedius (Ausserer, 1875) → Cyrtopholis intermedia

Phormictopus multicuspidatus Mello-Leitão, 1929 → Proshapalopus multicuspidatus

Phormictopus pheopygus Mello-Leitão, 1923 → Acanthoscurria gomesiana
