= Coenypha =

Scientific classification
- Kingdom: Animalia
- Phylum: Arthropoda
- Subphylum: Chelicerata
- Class: Arachnida
- Order: Araneae
- Infraorder: Araneomorphae
- Family: Thomisidae
- Genus: Coenypha; Simon, 1895

Type species
- C. edwardsi (Nicolet, 1849)

Species
- 7, see text

Genus of spiders

Coenypha is a genus of South American crab spiders that was first described by Eugène Louis Simon in 1895.

== Species ==
As of June 2021 it contains seven species, found in Chile:

- Coenypha antennata (Tullgren, 1902) (type) – Chile
- Coenypha ditissima (Nicolet, 1849) (type) – Chile
- Coenypha edwardsi (Nicolet, 1849) (type) – Chile
- Coenypha fasciata Mello-Leitão, 1926 – Chile
- Coenypha fuliginosa (Nicolet, 1849) – Chile
- Coenypha lucasi (Nicolet, 1849) – Chile
- Coenypha nodosa (Nicolet, 1849) – Chile

== See also ==
- List of Thomisidae species
