= Dubiaranea elegans =

Scientific classification
- Domain: Eukaryota
- Kingdom: Animalia
- Phylum: Arthropoda
- Subphylum: Chelicerata
- Class: Arachnida
- Order: Araneae
- Infraorder: Araneomorphae
- Family: Linyphiidae
- Genus: Dubiaranea
- Species: D. elegans

Binomial name
- Dubiaranea elegans Millidge, 1991

Species of spider

Dubiaranea elegans is a species of spiders in the family Linyphiidae. It is known from South America.
