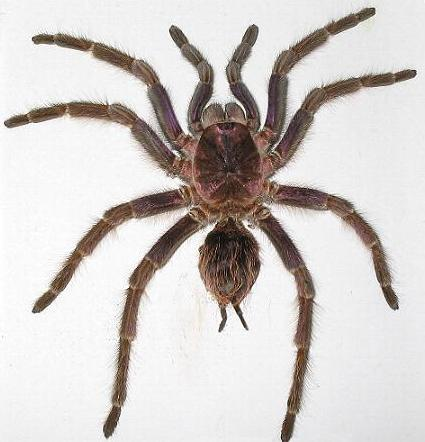

Scientific classification
- Kingdom: Animalia
- Phylum: Arthropoda
- Subphylum: Chelicerata
- Class: Arachnida
- Order: Araneae
- Infraorder: Mygalomorphae
- Family: Theraphosidae
- Genus: Phormictopus
- Species: P. cancerides

Binomial name
- Phormictopus cancerides (Latreille, 1806)

Synonyms
- Mygale cancerides Latreille, 1806; Mygale erichsonii C. L. Koch, 1841; Eurypelma cancerides (Latreille, 1806); Schizopelma erichsoni (C. L. Koch, 1841)

= Phormictopus cancerides =

Species of spider

Phormictopus cancerides, also known as the Hispaniolan giant tarantula, is a tarantula endemic to Hispaniola in the Caribbean.

== Hunting ==
During the day, they hide under rocks and debris, and come out at night to look for prey. Their fangs are more than 2 centimeters long. When they pierce the body of their prey, venom is injected, which paralyzes and breaks down the internal body tissue, allowing the tarantula to suck up the liquified insides. Its bite is rarely harmful to humans, but can cause irritation and swelling.

== Names ==
In the Dominican Republic, it is called "cacata"; in Haiti, it is called "araignée-krab" (lit. 'crab spider').

== As prey ==
Their most dangerous predator is the tarantula hawk. Locally, it is known as a matacacatas ("tarantula-killer"). This is a very large parasitoid wasp, with an iridescent blue-green body and orange-red wings that grows to about 2 inches or more in length. It captures the spider in its burrow or sometimes in the open and stings it to paralyze it and then lays its eggs on the abdomen. The wasp will drag its victim to a safe place to incubate its young. Once the larvae hatch they will feed on the alive but paralyzed tarantula until it dies.
