= Dubiaranea festiva =

Scientific classification
- Kingdom: Animalia
- Phylum: Arthropoda
- Subphylum: Chelicerata
- Class: Arachnida
- Order: Araneae
- Infraorder: Araneomorphae
- Family: Linyphiidae
- Genus: Dubiaranea
- Species: D. festiva

Binomial name
- Dubiaranea festiva (Millidge, 1985)

Synonyms
- Hormembolus festivus Millidge, 1985

Species of spider

Dubiaranea elegans is a species of spiders in the family Linyphiidae. It is found in Chile.
