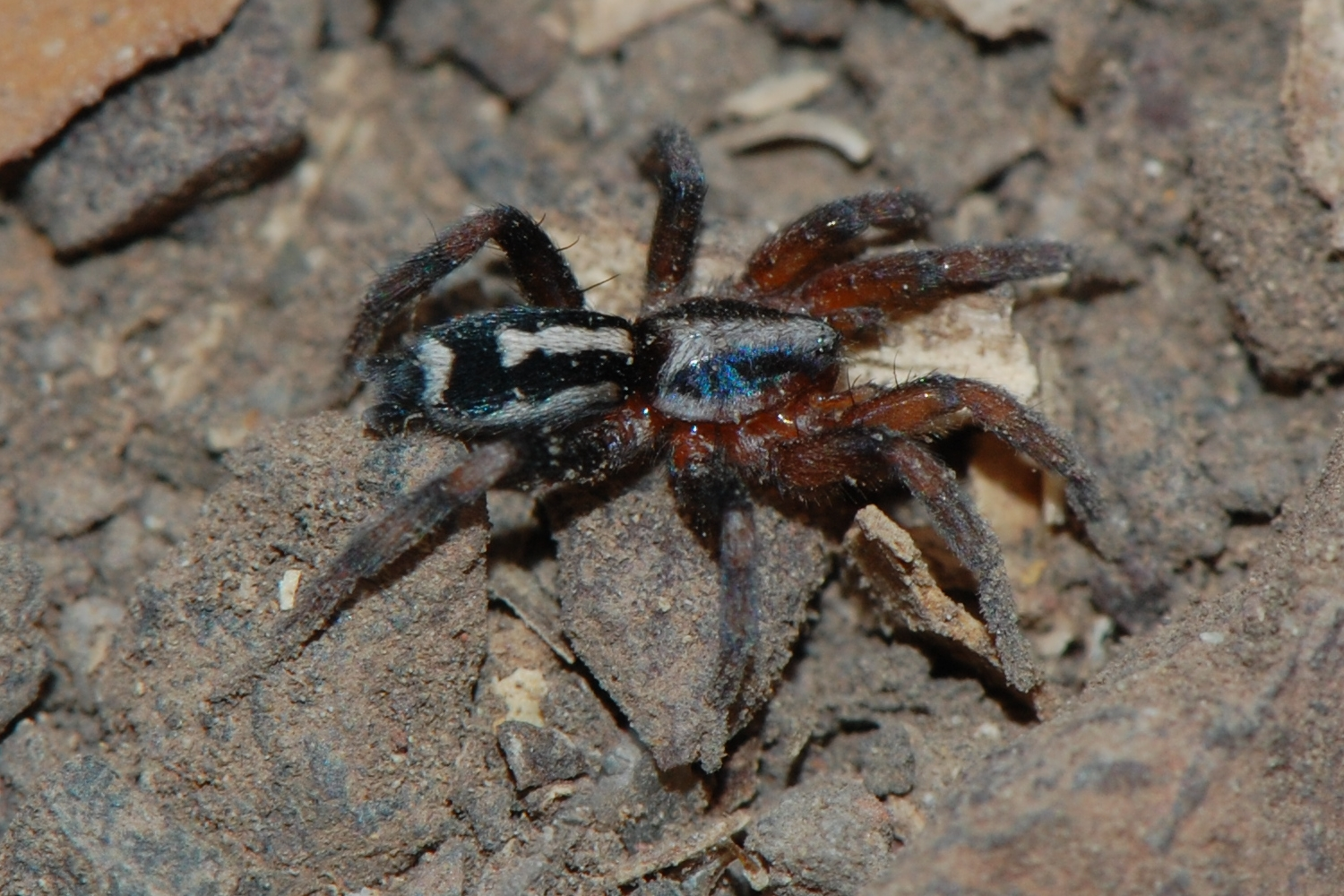

Scientific classification
- Domain: Eukaryota
- Kingdom: Animalia
- Phylum: Arthropoda
- Subphylum: Chelicerata
- Class: Arachnida
- Order: Araneae
- Infraorder: Araneomorphae
- Family: Gnaphosidae
- Genus: Cesonia
- Species: C. josephus

Binomial name
- Cesonia josephus (Chamberlin & Gertsch, 1940)

= Cesonia josephus =

Species of spider

Cesonia josephus is a species of ground spider in the family Gnaphosidae. It is found in the United States.
