= Acanthoscurria rhodothele =

Scientific classification
- Kingdom: Animalia
- Phylum: Arthropoda
- Subphylum: Chelicerata
- Class: Arachnida
- Order: Araneae
- Infraorder: Mygalomorphae
- Family: Theraphosidae
- Genus: Acanthoscurria
- Species: A. rhodothele

Binomial name
- Acanthoscurria rhodothele Mello-Leitão, 1923

Species of spider

Acanthoscurria rhodothele is a spider species described by Cândido Firmino de Mello-Leitão in 1923. It belongs to the genus Acanthoscurria and the family of tarantulas.
