= Cesonia rothi =

Scientific classification
- Kingdom: Animalia
- Phylum: Arthropoda
- Subphylum: Chelicerata
- Class: Arachnida
- Order: Araneae
- Infraorder: Araneomorphae
- Family: Gnaphosidae
- Genus: Cesonia
- Species: C. rothi

Binomial name
- Cesonia rothi Platnick & Shadab, 1980

Species of spider

Cesonia rothi is a species of ground spider in the family Gnaphosidae. It is found in the United States.
