= Key gnaphosid spider =

Conservation status
- Data Deficient (IUCN 2.3)

Scientific classification
- Kingdom: Animalia
- Phylum: Arthropoda
- Subphylum: Chelicerata
- Class: Arachnida
- Order: Araneae
- Infraorder: Araneomorphae
- Family: Gnaphosidae
- Genus: Cesonia
- Species: C. irvingi

Binomial name
- Cesonia irvingi (Mello-Leitão, 1944)

Synonyms
- Herpyllus australis Herpyllus irvingi

Species of spider

The Key gnaphosid spider (Cesonia irvingi) is a species of ground spider in the family Gnaphosidae. It was discovered by Mello-Leitão in 1944. It is found in the Bahamas, Florida, and Cuba.
