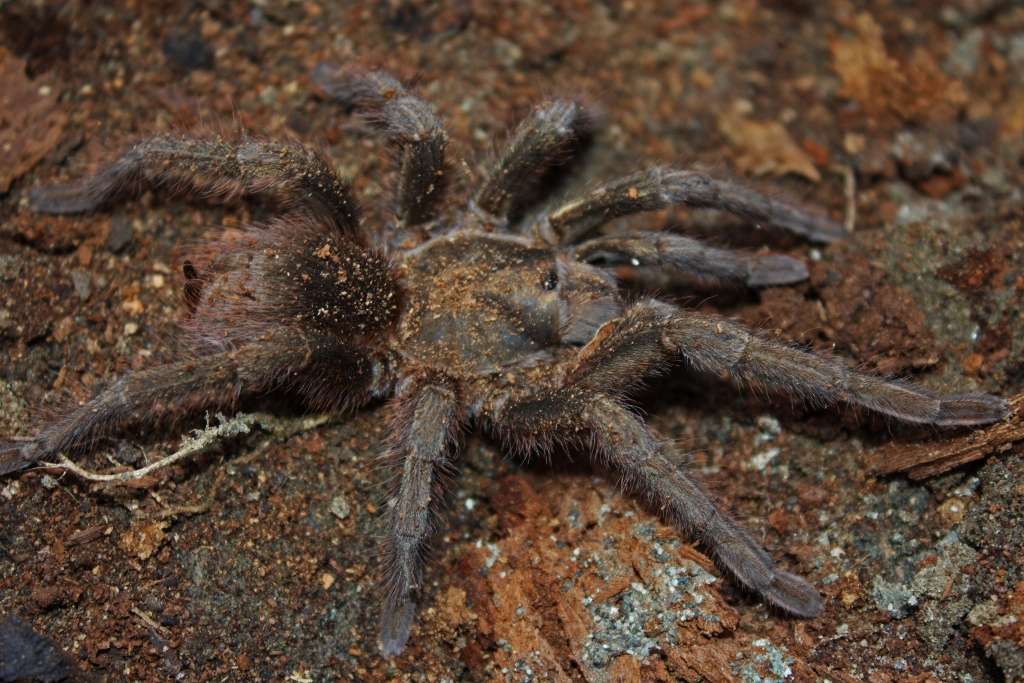

Scientific classification
- Kingdom: Animalia
- Phylum: Arthropoda
- Subphylum: Chelicerata
- Class: Arachnida
- Order: Araneae
- Infraorder: Mygalomorphae
- Clade: Avicularioidea
- Family: Theraphosidae
- Genus: Phormictopus
- Species: P. auratus

Binomial name
- Phormictopus auratus Ortiz & Bertani, 2005

= Phormictopus auratus =

Species of spider endemic to Cuba

Phormictopus auratus, commonly known as the Cuban bronze tarantula, is a species of tarantula endemic to Cuba. It is found in the provinces of Camagüey, Las Tunas and Holguín. It was first described by David Ortiz and Rogério Bertani in 2005, and was named after golden hairs found in this species, auratus meaning golden in Latin.

== Description ==
Females live up to 15 years, while males only live from 4 to 5. It is unmistakable for any tarantula in its genus, in a great part thanks to those golden coloration. Somehow it has been mistaken for other species in the genus. Their carapace is a golden color, alongside the legs, which are mostly covered in greyish hairs. The opisthosoma is black covered in grayish hairs, though this hairs alongside the ones of the legs may look blue in certain lighting conditions.

== Habitat ==
They can be found in Cuba in Las Tunas, Holguín and Camagüey, the latter being the one this section will be referring to. The average temperatures are 26 °C, with average yearly rainfall of 587mm. With plants such as Ceiba, Guásima and Yagruma.

== Behavior ==
This tarantula is terrestrial, they burrow quite a bit, and are usually out of their hides, wandering about. They are not by any means shy and are capable of moving quite fast, making them a bit scarier than most New World tarantulas.
