= Molinaranea magellanica =

Scientific classification
- Domain: Eukaryota
- Kingdom: Animalia
- Phylum: Arthropoda
- Subphylum: Chelicerata
- Class: Arachnida
- Order: Araneae
- Infraorder: Araneomorphae
- Family: Araneidae
- Genus: Molinaranea
- Species: M. magellanica

Binomial name
- Molinaranea magellanica (Walckenaer, 1847)

Synonyms
- Epeira magellanica Walckenaer, 1847; Epeira chilensis Nicolet, 1849; Epeira cinaberina Nicolet, 1849; Epeira flaviventris Nicolet, 1849; Epeira quadripunctata Nicolet, 1849 (preoccupied); Epeira obliterata Nicolet, 1849; Epeira affinis Nicolet, 1849 (preoccupied); Epeira naevia Nicolet, 1849; Epeira dorsalis Nicolet, 1849 (preoccupied); Epeira quadrimaculata Nicolet, 1849 (preoccupied); Araneus flaviventris (Nicolet, 1849); Araneus patagonicus Tullgren, 1901; Araneus chilensis (Nicolet, 1849); Araneus cinnaberinus (Nicolet, 1849); Araneus quadrimaculatus (Nicolet, 1849); Araneus vallentini Hogg, 1913; Araneus globiger Hogg, 1913; Eriophora wagenknechti Mello-Leitão, 1940; Molinaranea molinai Mello-Leitão, 1940; Aranea affinitata Roewer, 1942 (replacement name for Epeira affinis); Aranea dorsatula Roewer, 1942 (replacement name for Epeira dorsalis); Aranea quadrimaculosa Roewer, 1942 (replacement name for Epeira quadrimaculata); Aranea quadripunctatula Roewer, 1942 (replacement name for Epeira quadripunctata); Araneus cinnabarinus (Nicolet, 1849) (orth. var.); Parawixia affinitata (Roewer, 1942); Parawixia cinnaberina (Nicolet, 1849) (orth. var.); Parawixia dosatula (Roewer, 1942); Parawixia wagenknechti (Mello-Leitão, 1940); Parawixia flaviventris (Nicolet, 1849); Parawixia obliterata (Nicolet, 1849); Parawixia naevia (Nicolet, 1849); Metepeira chilensis (Nicolet, 1849); Molinaranea chilensis (Nicolet, 1849); Molinaranea patagonica (Tullgren, 1901); Molinaranea cinaberina (Nicolet, 1849)

Species of spider

Molinaranea magellanica is a species of orb-weaver spider (family Araneidae) endemic to Chile, Argentina, the Juan Fernández Islands and the Falkland Islands. It is also known as the Falklands green spider. It is the largest endemic spider known to exist in the Falklands.

== Taxonomy ==
The species was first described in 1847 by Charles Athanase Walckenaer as Epeira magellanica. It has been described under a large number of synonyms in nine genera. Nine names used by Hercule Nicolet in 1849, including Epeira cinaberina, are now considered to be synonyms.
