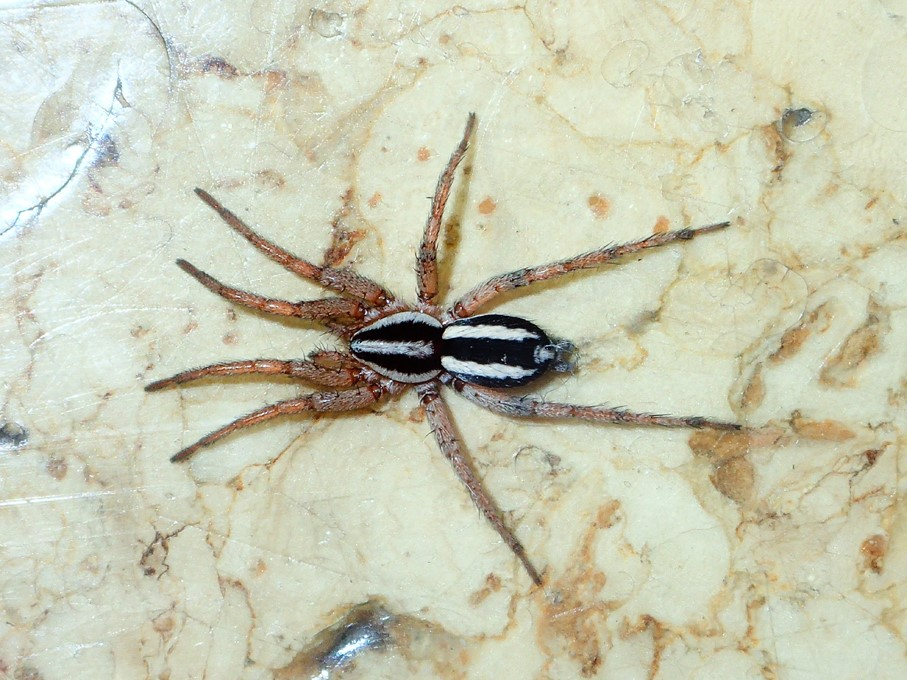

Scientific classification
- Kingdom: Animalia
- Phylum: Arthropoda
- Subphylum: Chelicerata
- Class: Arachnida
- Order: Araneae
- Infraorder: Araneomorphae
- Family: Gnaphosidae
- Genus: Cesonia
- Species: C. classica

Binomial name
- Cesonia classica Chamberlin, 1924

= Cesonia classica =

Species of spider

Cesonia classica is a species of ground spider in the family Gnaphosidae. It is found in the United States and Mexico.
