= Acanthoscurria musculosa =

Scientific classification
- Kingdom: Animalia
- Phylum: Arthropoda
- Subphylum: Chelicerata
- Class: Arachnida
- Order: Araneae
- Infraorder: Mygalomorphae
- Family: Theraphosidae
- Genus: Acanthoscurria
- Species: A. musculosa

Binomial name
- Acanthoscurria musculosa Simon, 1892

Species of spiders

Acanthoscurria musculosa is a species of terrestrial tarantula discovered in 1892 by Eugène Simon. This species is a dark brown to black and its common name is the Brazilian Black Velvet Tarantula. This species tends to prefer temperatures of 76 to 85 degrees Fahrenheit and 65 to 75% humidity when kept as pets. As with other spiders of this genus, this species needs at least four inches of substrate because, despite their terrestrial nature, they tend to burrow occasionally. They can get up to 5-6 inches and are typically docile towards humans, yet very aggressive towards their prey.
