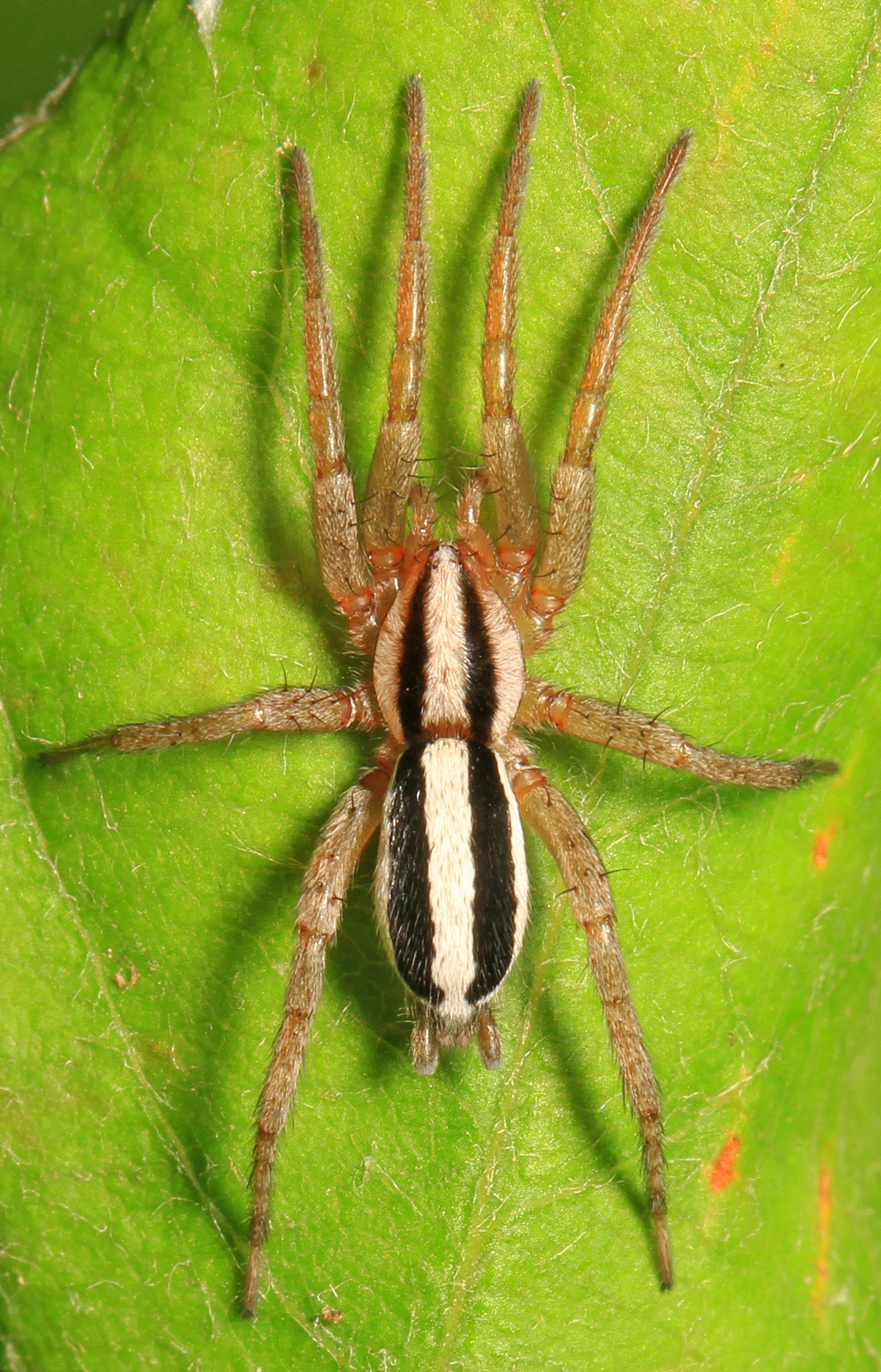

Scientific classification
- Domain: Eukaryota
- Kingdom: Animalia
- Phylum: Arthropoda
- Subphylum: Chelicerata
- Class: Arachnida
- Order: Araneae
- Infraorder: Araneomorphae
- Family: Gnaphosidae
- Genus: Cesonia
- Species: C. bilineata

Binomial name
- Cesonia bilineata (Hentz, 1847)

Synonyms
- Herpyllus bilineatus Hentz, 1847

= Cesonia bilineata =

Species of spider

Cesonia bilineata, the two-lined stealthy ground spider, is a species of ground spider in the family Gnaphosidae. The species was first described by Nicholas Marcellus Hentz in 1847. It is found in North America. It is found in a variety of habitats: forests, prairies and even urban areas. In summer females lay their eggs in a sac under stones or leaves.
