= Acanthoscurria belterrensis =

Scientific classification
- Kingdom: Animalia
- Phylum: Arthropoda
- Subphylum: Chelicerata
- Class: Arachnida
- Order: Araneae
- Infraorder: Mygalomorphae
- Family: Theraphosidae
- Genus: Acanthoscurria
- Species: A. belterrensis

Binomial name
- Acanthoscurria belterrensis Paula, Gabriel, Indicatti, Brescovit & Lucas (2014)

Species of tarantula

Acanthoscurria belterrensis is a species of tarantula native to Brazil. They typically are a dark reddish-brown color and sometimes have a more orange toned abdomen. This species is not recorded to have been kept as pets and does not have much information about it, partially due to its recent discovery in 2014.
