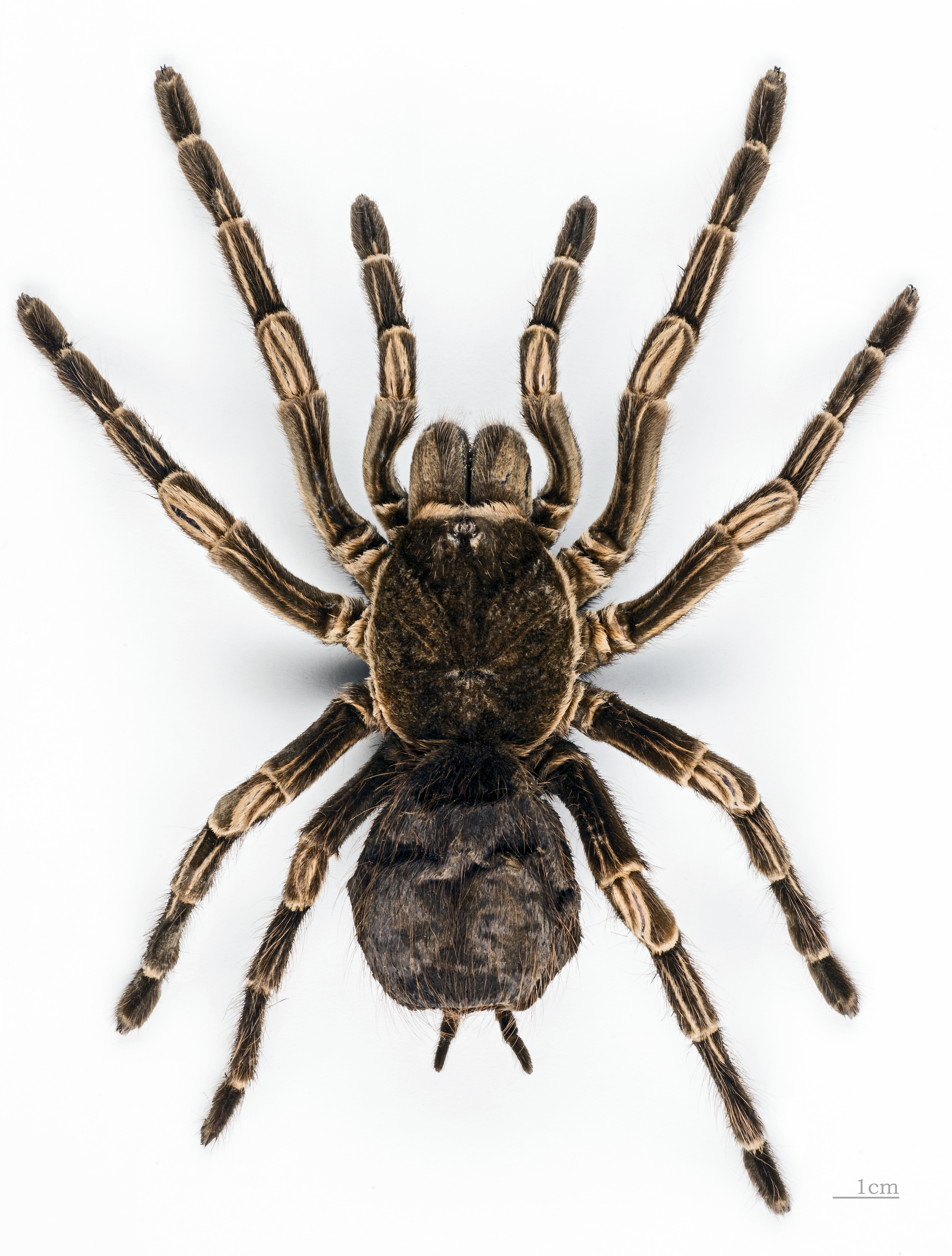
- Acanthoscurria juruenicola

Scientific classification
- Kingdom: Animalia
- Phylum: Arthropoda
- Subphylum: Chelicerata
- Class: Arachnida
- Order: Araneae
- Infraorder: Mygalomorphae
- Family: Theraphosidae
- Genus: Acanthoscurria; Ausserer, 1871

Type species
- A. geniculata (C. L. Koch, 1841)

Species
- 19, see text

Synonyms
- Trasyphoberus Simon, 1903

= Acanthoscurria =

Genus of spiders

Acanthoscurria is a genus of tarantulas that was first described by Anton Ausserer in 1871. They are found throughout South America including the countries of Argentina, Bolivia, Brazil, Ecuador, French Guiana, Guyana, Paraguay, Peru, Suriname and Venezuela, plus into the Windward Islands West Indies, .

== Species ==
As of December 2025, it contained nineteen species, found in South America and the West Indies:

- Acanthoscurria armasi Sherwood, Gabriel, Peñaherrera–R. & Alayón, 2025 – Colombia
- Acanthoscurria belterrensis Paula, Gabriel, Indicatti, Brescovit & Lucas, 2014 – Brazil
- Acanthoscurria chacoana Brèthes, 1909 – Brazil, Bolivia, Paraguay, Argentina
- Acanthoscurria cordubensis Thorell, 1894 – Argentina
- Acanthoscurria geniculata (C. L. Koch, 1841) (type) – Brazil
- Acanthoscurria gomesiana Mello–Leitão, 1923 – Brazil
- Acanthoscurria insubtilis Simon, 1892 – Bolivia, Brazil
- Acanthoscurria juruenicola Mello–Leitão, 1923 – Brazil
- Acanthoscurria maga Simon, 1892 – South America
- Acanthoscurria melloleitaoi Bertani, 2023 – Brazil
- Acanthoscurria musculosa Simon, 1892 – Bolivia
- Acanthoscurria natalensis Chamberlin, 1917 – Brazil
- Acanthoscurria paulensis Mello–Leitão, 1923 – Brazil
- Acanthoscurria rhodothele Mello–Leitão, 1923 – Brazil
- Acanthoscurria simoensi Vol, 2000 – French Guiana, Brazil
- Acanthoscurria tarda Pocock, 1903 – Brazil
- Acanthoscurria theraphosoides (Doleschall, 1871) – Peru, Bolivia, Brazil, French Guiana
- Acanthoscurria turumban Rodríguez–Manzanilla & Bertani, 2010 – Venezuela
- Acanthoscurria urens Vellard, 1924 – Brazil
