= Carl Ludwig Koch =

German arachnologist (1778–1857)

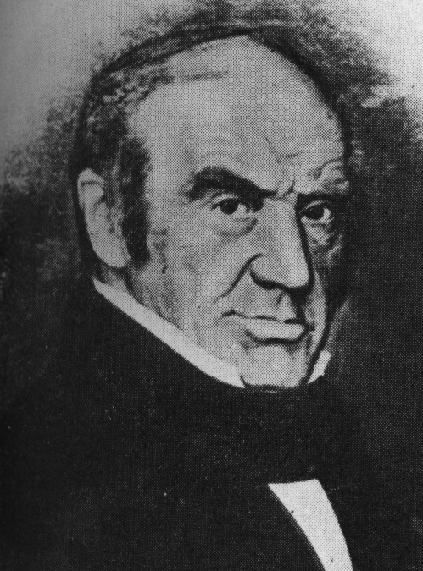
- Born: 21 September 1778; Kusel, Holy Roman Empire
- Died: 23 August 1857 (aged 78); Nuremberg, Germany
- Scientific career
- Fields: Entomology and arachnology
- Author abbrev. (zoology): C.L.Koch

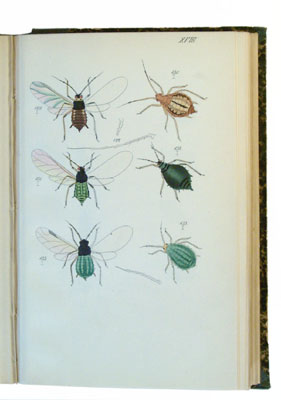
Carl Ludwig Koch Die Pflanzenläuse, Aphiden

Carl Ludwig Koch (21 September 1778 – 23 August 1857) was a German entomologist and arachnologist. He was responsible for classifying a great number of spiders, including the Brazilian whiteknee tarantula and common house spider. He was born in Kusel in the Holy Roman Empire, and died in Nuremberg, Germany.

Carl Ludwig Koch was an inspector of water and forests. His principal work Die Arachniden (1831–1848) (16 volumes) was commenced by Carl Wilhelm Hahn (1786–1836). Koch was responsible for the last 12 volumes. He also finished the chapter on spiders in Faunae insectorum germanicae initia oder Deutschlands Insecten [Elements of the insect fauna of Germany] a work by Georg Wolfgang Franz Panzer (1755–1829).

He also co-authored, with Georg Karl Berendt, an important monograph Die im Bernstein befindlichen Myriapoden, Arachniden und Apteren der Vorwelt (1854) on arachnids, myriapods, and wingless insects in amber based on material in Berendt's collection, now held in the Museum für Naturkunde, Berlin.

He is not to be confused with his son, Ludwig Carl Christian Koch (1825–1908), who also became a well-known entomologist. For species descriptions, his name is abbreviated as C. L. Koch, and his son as L. Koch.

== Works ==
- Die Pflanzenlause Aphiden : getreu nach dem Leben abgebildet und beschrieben, Nürnberg 1854
- Die Pflanzenlause Aphiden. Lotzbeck, Nürnberg 1857.
- Übersicht des Arachnidensystems. Zeh, Nürnberg 1837–50.
- Deutschlands Crustaceen, Myriapoden und Arachniden. Pustet, Regensburg 1835–44.
- Die Arachniden. Zeh, Nürnberg 1831–48.
- System der baierischen Zoologie. Nürnberg, München 1816.(A general work on the zoology of Bavaria of some importance in bird taxonomy.
- System der Myriapoden, mit den Verzeichnissen und Berichtigungen zu Deutschlands Crustaceen, Myriapoden, und Arachniden, Regensburg, Pustet,1847.

== Literature ==
- Roesler, Rudolf: Karl Ludwig Koch (1778-1857). in Oberpfälzer Heimat. Auflage 42, Weiden 1997/98.
