= Acanthoscurria maga =

Antilles pink patch tarantula
- Acanthoscurria maga on top of the Montagne Pelée, Matteo Bellucci.

Scientific classification
- Kingdom: Animalia
- Phylum: Arthropoda
- Subphylum: Chelicerata
- Class: Arachnida
- Order: Araneae
- Infraorder: Mygalomorphae
- Family: Theraphosidae
- Genus: Acanthoscurria
- Species: A. maga

Binomial name
- Acanthoscurria maga Simon, 1892

Synonyms
- Acanthoscurria antillensis Pocock, 1903

Species of tarantula

Acanthoscurria maga is a terrestrial tarantula species of the genus Acanthoscurria that previously has also been referred to as Acanthoscurria antillensis. A. maga is considered the senior synonym to A. antillensis and the common name of this species is the Antilles pink patch tarantula.

== Distribution ==
Acanthoscurria maga is endemic to Martinique.

== Habitat ==
This species prefers relatively high humidity, warm environments, from 65 to 75% humidity and 76–85 °F (24–29 °C). It is slow growing and tends to burrow, a feature of its nature as a terrestrial tarantula.

It is found in the soil litter of dry littoral forests up to the summit of the Pelée volcano.

== Description ==
The coloration of this species ranges from medium to light brown, with the hue typically appearing lighter in males. Pink spots are also noted on the legs and lower abdomen of this species, and are used as a main identifying feature. This species of tarantula can possibly reach up to 6–7 inches (15–18 cm) in diagonal leg span, with females generally being larger than males.

== Diet ==
Similarly to other species in the Acanthoscurria genus, this species mainly feeds on insects such as crickets, cockroaches, and other similar available invertebrates.

== Lifespan ==
Specimens of A. maga have been reported to live up to 25 years, however male tarantulas generally have significantly shorter lifespans than females of the same species.

== Behavior ==
Members of the species A. maga are considered to be defensive but not as aggressive as many other tarantula species when unprovoked. They have the same defense mechanisms as other members of their genus: venom and urticating hairs.
