= Acanthoscurria simoensi =

Scientific classification
- Kingdom: Animalia
- Phylum: Arthropoda
- Subphylum: Chelicerata
- Class: Arachnida
- Order: Araneae
- Infraorder: Mygalomorphae
- Family: Theraphosidae
- Genus: Acanthoscurria
- Species: A. simoensi

Binomial name
- Acanthoscurria simoensi Vol, 2000

Species of spider

Acanthoscurria simoensi is a species of tarantula spider found in Guyana, French Guiana, and Brazil, first described from French Guiana in 2000. The species has been traded in the exotic pet hobby as "Para Mongo Zebra” under spurious scientific names such as 'fracta'. The common name partly relates to the colouration where the females of the species have dark bodies with light coloured linear markings on legs. Notably, like in many other tarantulas with strong sexual dimorpsim, adult males of the species have a different general appearance with a more rusty metallic colouration and comparatively weak linear markings on the legs.
