= Acanthoscurria tarda =

Scientific classification
- Kingdom: Animalia
- Phylum: Arthropoda
- Subphylum: Chelicerata
- Class: Arachnida
- Order: Araneae
- Infraorder: Mygalomorphae
- Family: Theraphosidae
- Genus: Acanthoscurria
- Species: A. tarda

Binomial name
- Acanthoscurria tarda Pocock, 1903

Species of spider

Acanthoscurria tarda is a species of spider belonging to the family Theraphosidae. It is native to Brazil. This species was described by Pocock in 1903.
