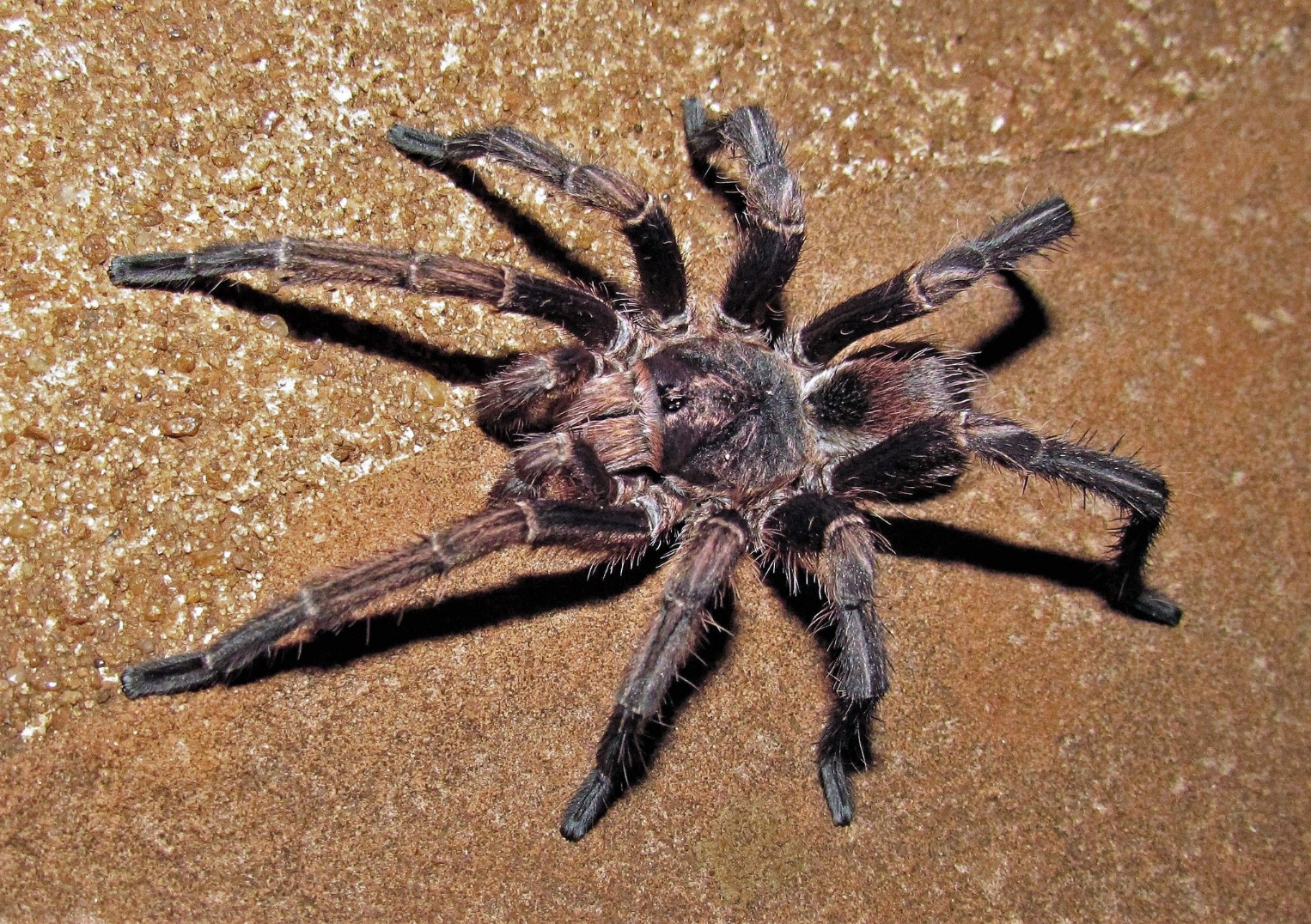

Scientific classification
- Kingdom: Animalia
- Phylum: Arthropoda
- Subphylum: Chelicerata
- Class: Arachnida
- Order: Araneae
- Infraorder: Mygalomorphae
- Family: Theraphosidae
- Genus: Acanthoscurria
- Species: A. cordubensis

Binomial name
- Acanthoscurria cordubensis Thorell (1894)

= Acanthoscurria cordubensis =

Tarantula Species

Acanthoscurria cordubensis is a species of terrestrial tarantula that thrives in high humidity environments. It is also known as the Rusty Brown Bird Eater due to its medium brown color. The previous scientific name for this species was Acanthoscurria suina and it is native to Argentina and south of Uruguay. Male specimens of this species can live about 4 years, but the females can get to 20 years old and can reach a size of about 7.5 inches, though this size estimate is based on a low sample size.
