= Cesonia elegans =

Scientific classification
- Kingdom: Animalia
- Phylum: Arthropoda
- Subphylum: Chelicerata
- Class: Arachnida
- Order: Araneae
- Infraorder: Araneomorphae
- Family: Gnaphosidae
- Genus: Cesonia
- Species: C. elegans

Binomial name
- Cesonia elegans Simon, 1891

Species of spider

Cesonia elegans is a spider species in the genus of Cesonia found on St. Vincent, Dominica.
