= Cyrtopholis femoralis =

Scientific classification
- Kingdom: Animalia
- Phylum: Arthropoda
- Subphylum: Chelicerata
- Class: Arachnida
- Order: Araneae
- Infraorder: Mygalomorphae
- Family: Theraphosidae
- Genus: Cyrtopholis
- Species: C. femoralis

Binomial name
- Cyrtopholis femoralis Pocock, 1903

Species of tarantula

Cyrtopholis femoralis is a tarantula species in the Cyrtopholis genus, it was first described by Reginald Innes Pocock in 1903, it is found in Montserrat, gaining it its common name as the Montserrat tarantula. It is possible that Cyrtopholis femoralis may be made up of two species occupying distinct areas of Montserrat, investigating the presence of this species is important for the understanding of this species. The main known predator of this species is Leptodactylus fallax, known as the mountain chicken, or the giant ditch frog.

== Description ==
Females grow to about 40 mm (1.6 in), and their lifespan is not known. This species color is a deep chestnut to greyish sometimes black color on their legs and body, with some lighter leg joints. With some pale brown to grey on the lower segments, though some darker specimens have been registered. Observation from captive individuals have shown their egg sack to be about 220 eggs.

== Habitat ==
This spider is thought to have been widespread across Montserrat, although most of it has been lost, it mainly inhabits natural areas, and those whom have been heavily modified. The main deciding factor of this tarantula living area is the substrate, as a burrower it needs to well burrow, and its believed this tarantula is widespread across Montserrat. Montserrat has average temperature are about 27 °C (81 °F), and the average yearly rainfall is 1,600 mm (63 in), the climate being subtropical.

== Behavior ==
This tarantula is probably a burrowing terrestrial tarantula, and also shows some amount of community as juveniles, though as adults they seem to become more solitary. This species make 10 to about 15 cm long and about 5 cm wide burrows. This tarantulas seem to be rather peaceful compared to other burrowing tarantulas, as once a mating pair occupied the same tank for 12 hours.

== Breeding Efforts ==
The Chester Zoo obtained wild caught individuals from around July from 2013, though the age of this individuals where unknown. This zoo managed to breed this tarantula in 2016, and they are being observed to understand their lifespan. This tarantula have had some problems with their habitat, as invasive species, development and the volcanic development are major threats to this spider.
