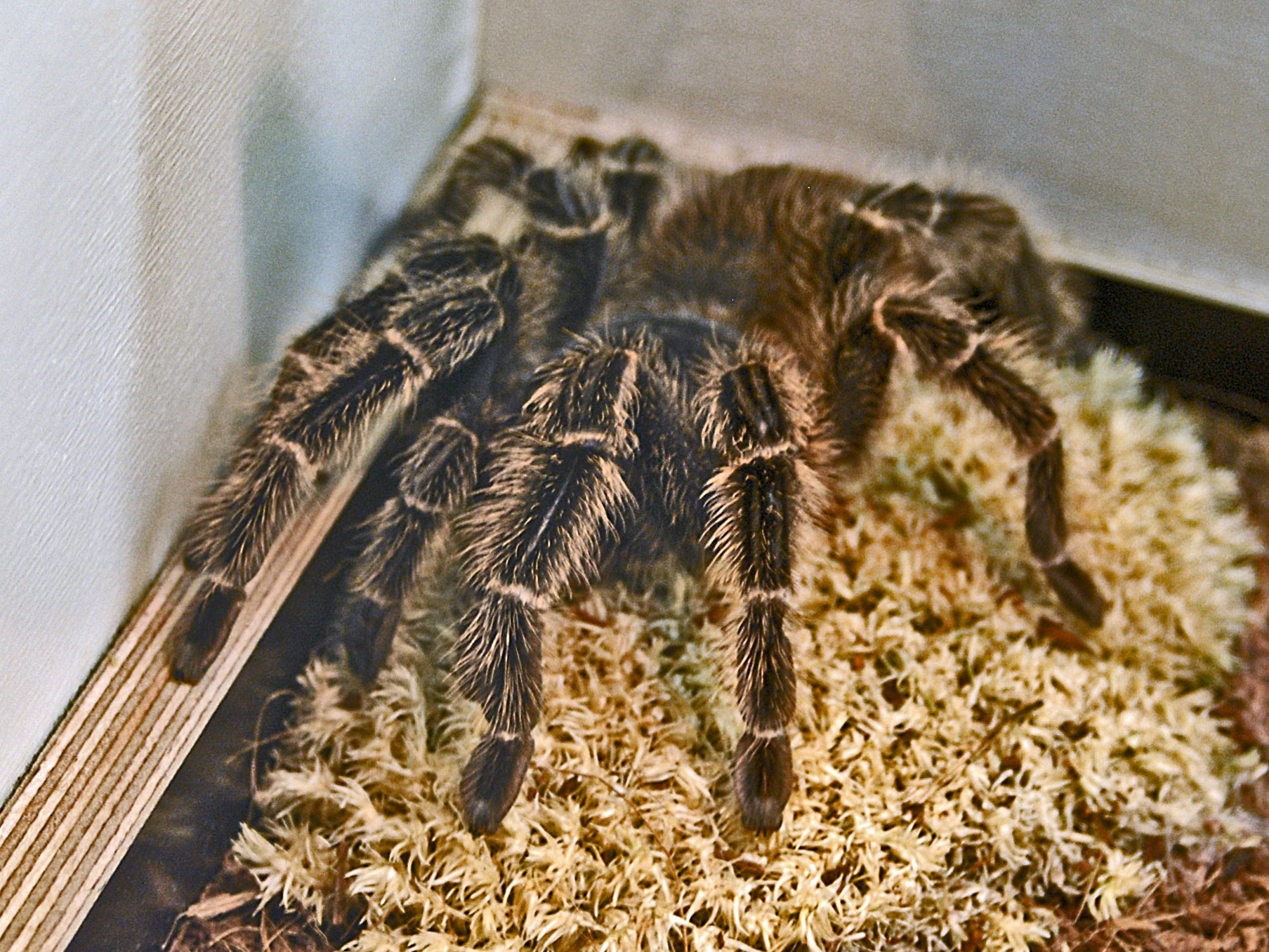
- Lasiodora difficilis

Scientific classification
- Kingdom: Animalia
- Phylum: Arthropoda
- Subphylum: Chelicerata
- Class: Arachnida
- Order: Araneae
- Infraorder: Mygalomorphae
- Family: Theraphosidae
- Genus: Lasiodora
- Species: L. difficilis

Binomial name
- Lasiodora difficilis Mello-Leitão, 1921

= Lasiodora difficilis =

Species of spider

Lasiodora difficilis, common name Brazilian red birdeater, is a species of tarantulas belonging to the family Theraphosidae.

== Distribution ==
This species is native to Brazil.

== Habitat ==
These tarantulas live in rainforests characterized by a wet tropical climate with little or no dry season and abundant rainfall.

== Behavior ==
These spiders take refuge in a long hole or under roots or stones. They feed on insects, worms, grasshoppers and crickets. The egg sac may contain 500-1000 spiderlings.

== Description ==
Lasiodora difficilis can reach a body length of 9 centimetres (3.5 in), with a leg span of seven to eight inches. Males are smaller than female. The basic color of these heavy-bodied spiders varies between black and black-gray, with urticating red hairs on the abdomen.
