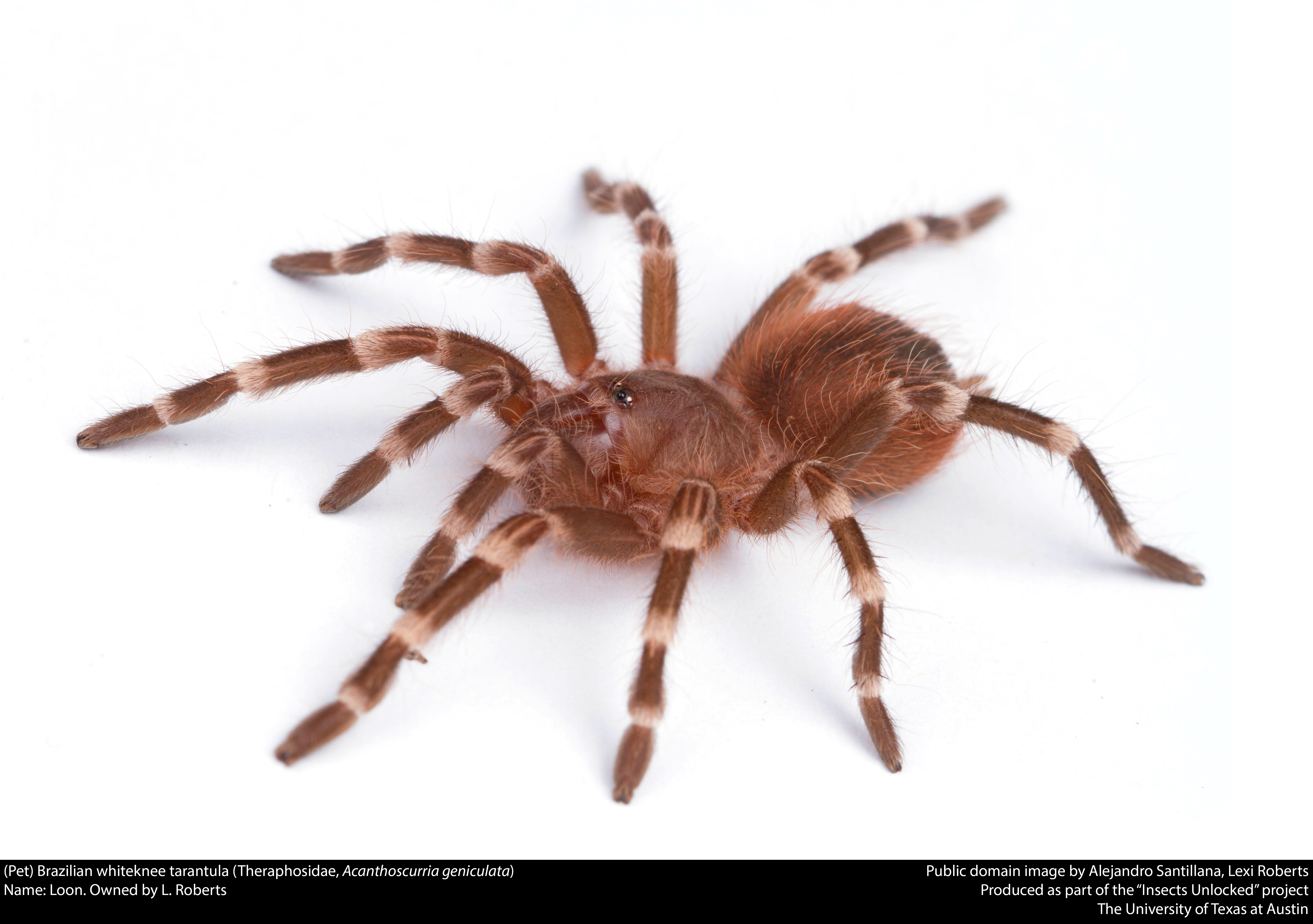

Scientific classification
- Kingdom: Animalia
- Phylum: Arthropoda
- Subphylum: Chelicerata
- Class: Arachnida
- Order: Araneae
- Infraorder: Mygalomorphae
- Family: Theraphosidae
- Genus: Acanthoscurria
- Species: A. geniculata

Binomial name
- Acanthoscurria geniculata (C.L. Koch, 1841)

Synonyms
- Mygale geniculata C.L. Koch, 1841; Scurria geniculata C.L. Koch, 1850

= Brazilian whiteknee tarantula =

Species of arachnid

The Brazilian whiteknee tarantula (Acanthoscurria geniculata) is a species of tarantula from Brazil that is commonly kept as a pet.

== Distribution and habitat ==
A. geniculata is native to the Amazon basin of northern Brazil. These tarantulas live in a tropical, wet climate, characterized by abundant rainfall with little to no dry season.

== Description ==
The body and legs of the Brazilian whiteknee tarantula are a deep brown color, often with some pink or orange hairs, though occasionally the legs may be slightly lighter in coloration. This contrasts the bright white bands on its legs, which are generally considered to be the main reason for its subjective beauty. The males are smaller and less intensely colored. This is a larger species of tarantula than the norm, with the length of the body reaching up to 9 centimeters. These tarantulas are fast growing, usually taking around 3–4 years to reach a mature leg-span of 8.5 inches for females.

== As pets ==
These tarantulas have been much prized as pets, due to their size, hardiness, and striking coloration. They are usually somewhat defensive, and their urticating hairs can be quite irritating to human skin, as with most other tarantulas found in the Americas.

These spiders, like many undomesticated pets, can bite when provoked. However, as they have urticating hairs, biting is typically not their first line of defense. Their venom is not considered medically significant, but due to their large size, they can cause tissue damage.

== Gallery ==
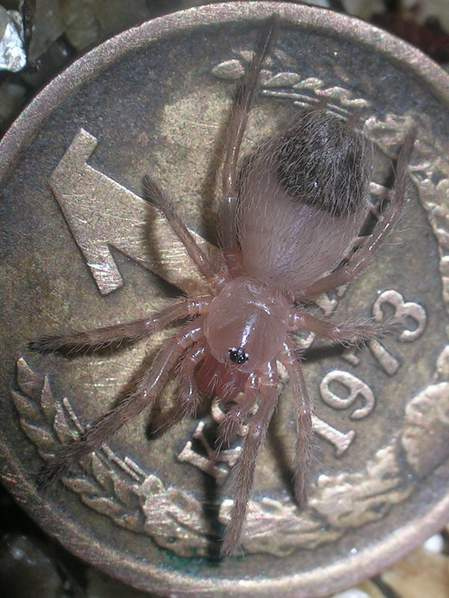

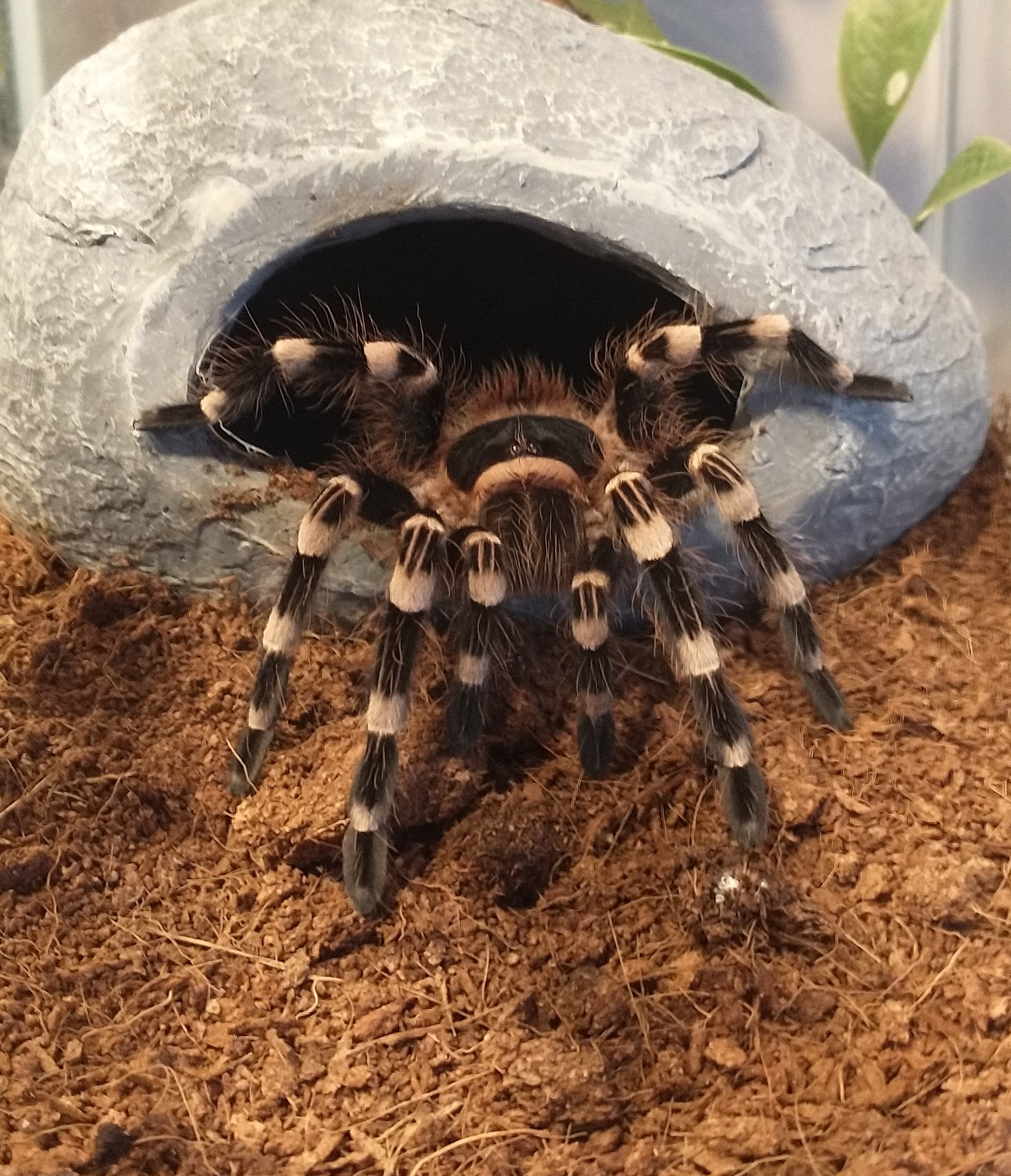

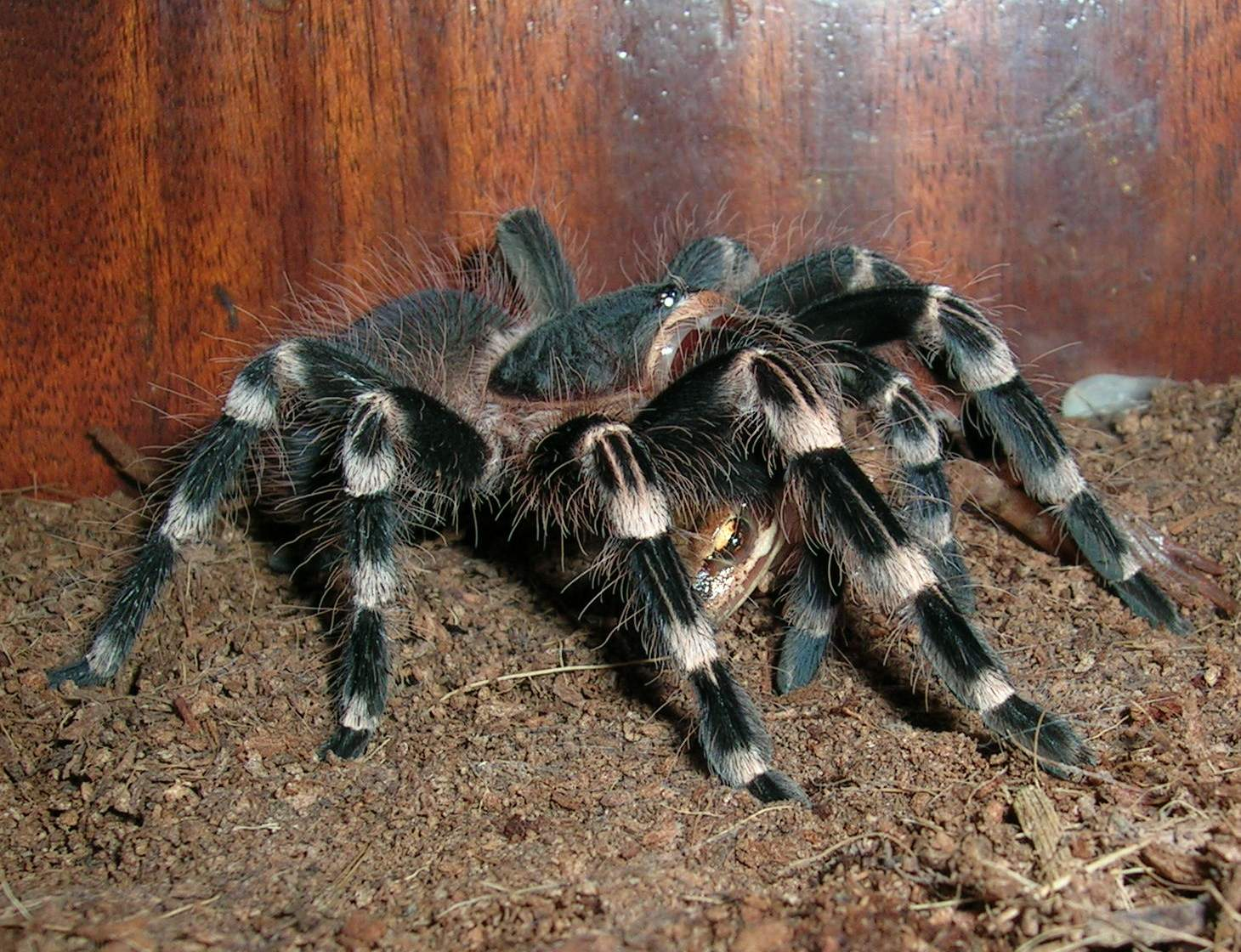

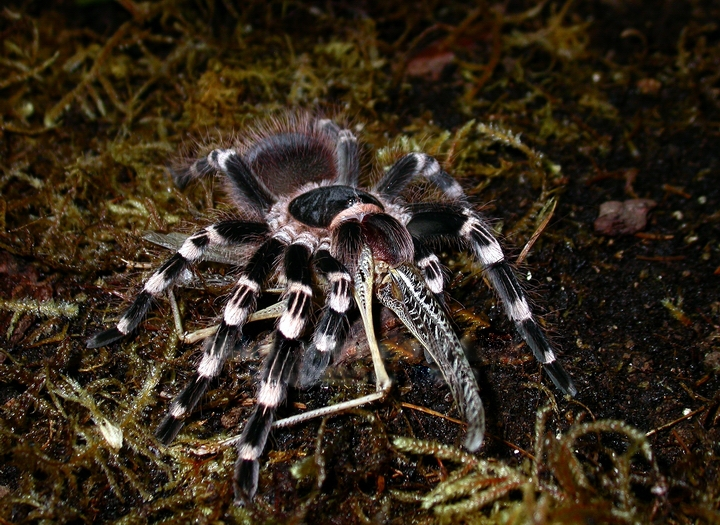

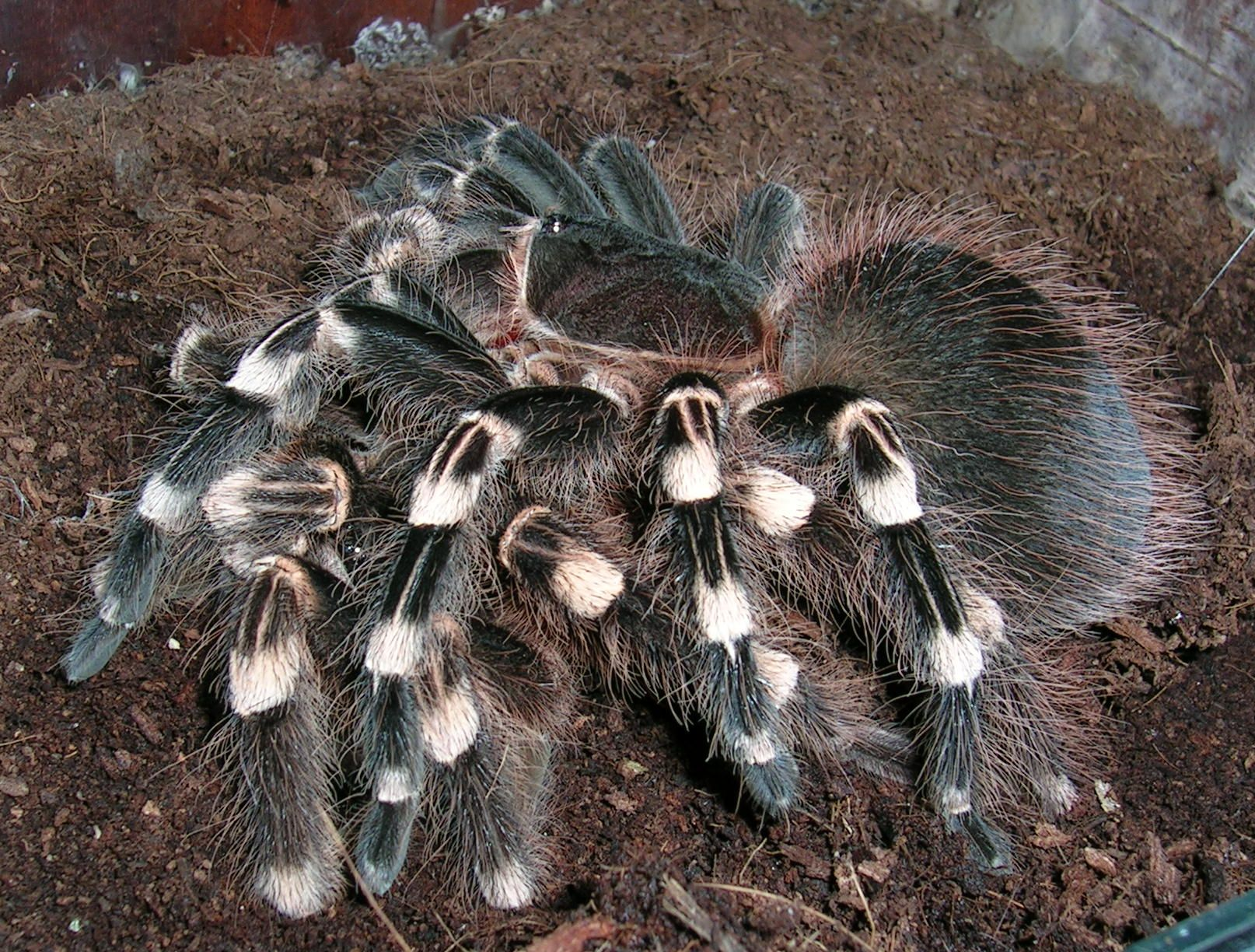

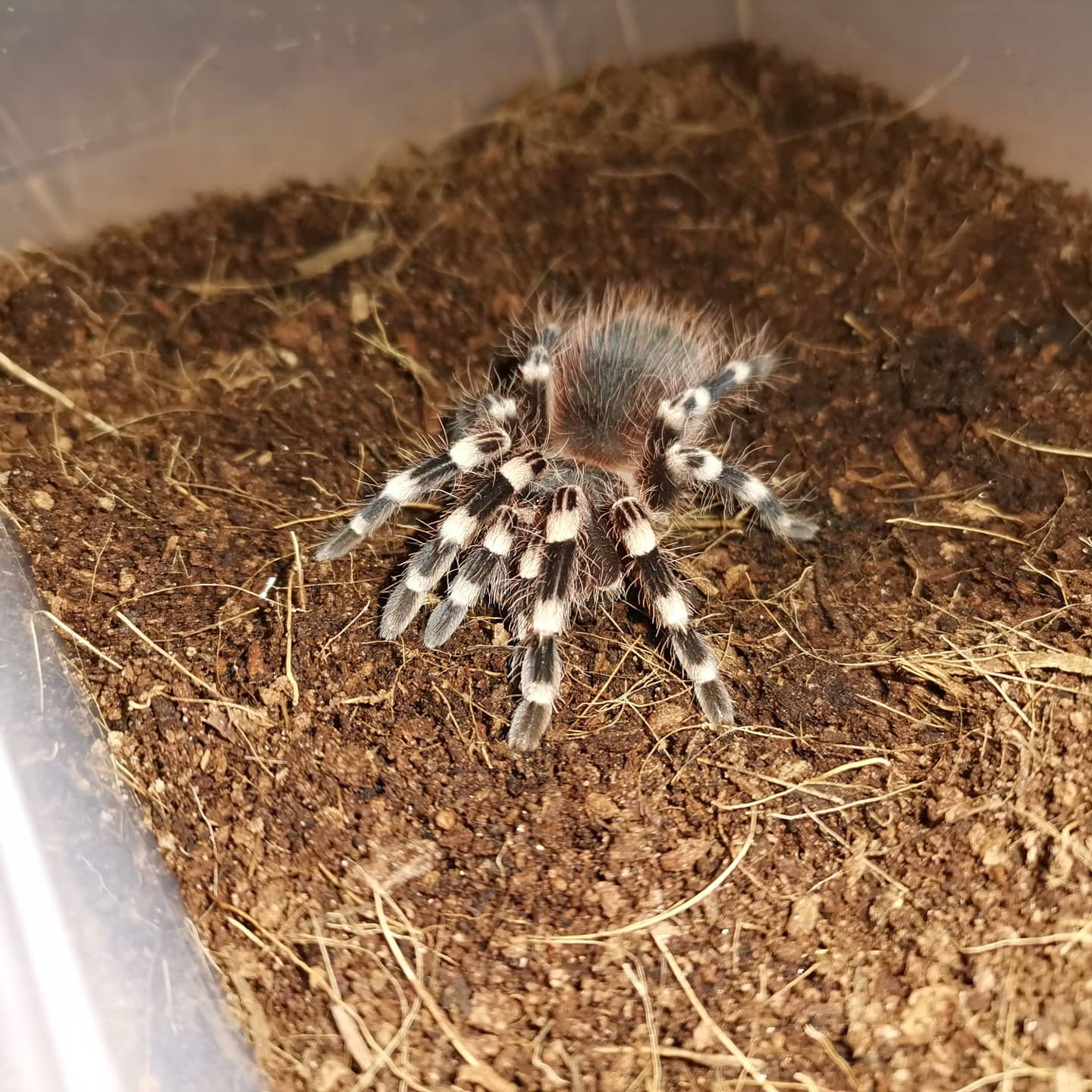
