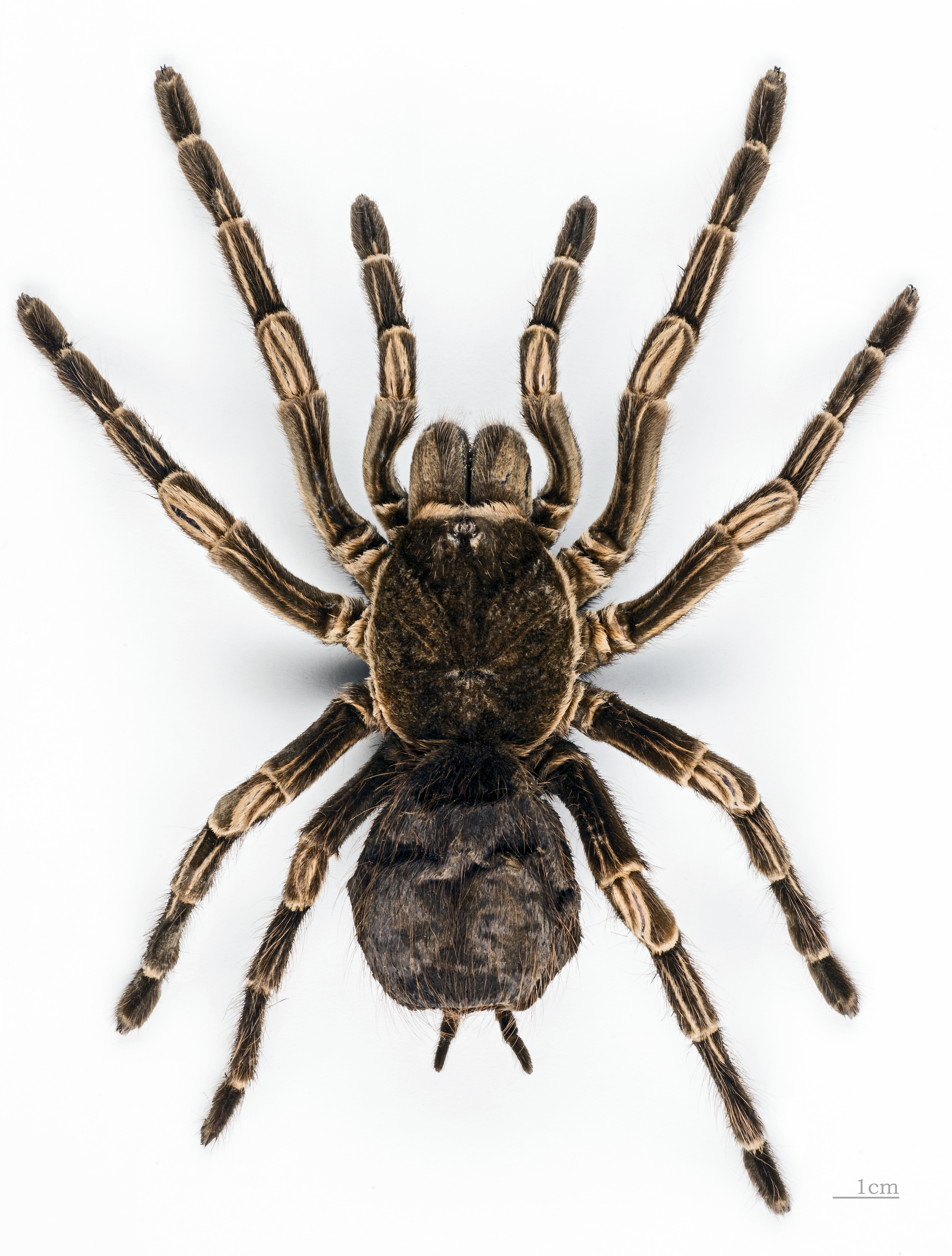

Scientific classification
- Kingdom: Animalia
- Phylum: Arthropoda
- Subphylum: Chelicerata
- Class: Arachnida
- Order: Araneae
- Infraorder: Mygalomorphae
- Family: Theraphosidae
- Genus: Acanthoscurria
- Species: A. juruenicola

Binomial name
- Acanthoscurria juruenicola Mello-Leitão (1923)

= Acanthoscurria juruenicola =

Tarantula species

Acanthoscurria juruenicola is a species of ground dwelling tarantula native to Brazil. Its common name is the Brazilian orange-banded tarantula and it is not often kept as a pet, but it can be given the right conditions. Typically, this species lives in conditions with 65-75% humidity with temperatures ranging from 76 to 85 degrees Fahrenheit. They can get up to 7 inches and, but their sex and environment are factors that can affect their size.
