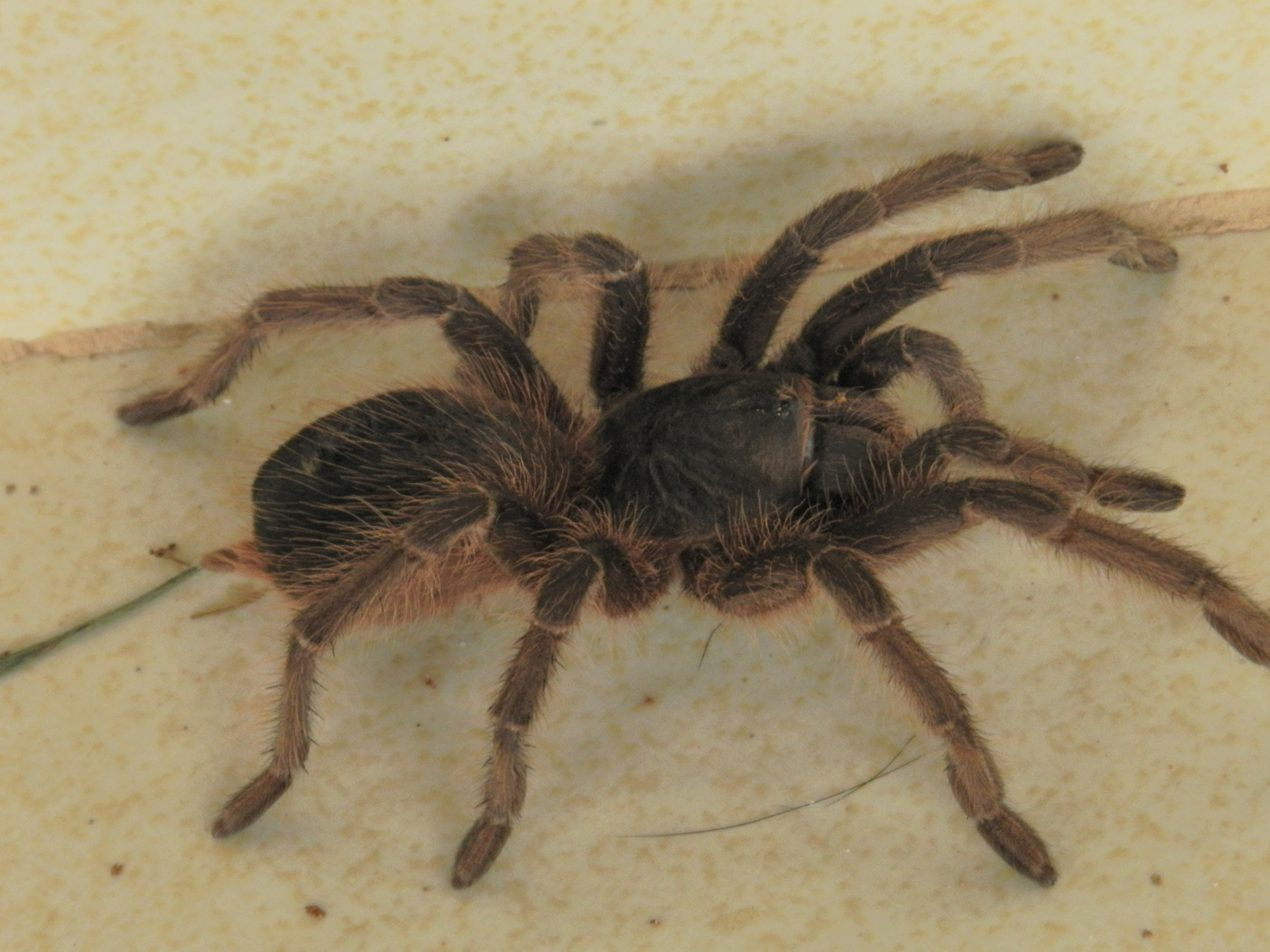

Scientific classification
- Kingdom: Animalia
- Phylum: Arthropoda
- Subphylum: Chelicerata
- Class: Arachnida
- Order: Araneae
- Infraorder: Mygalomorphae
- Family: Theraphosidae
- Genus: Acanthoscurria
- Species: A. paulensis

Binomial name
- Acanthoscurria paulensis Mello-Leitão, 1923

= Acanthoscurria paulensis =

Species of tarantula

Acanthoscurria paulensis is a species of tarantula native to the state of São Paulo and Mato Grosso. They prefer temperatures of 72–82 °F (22–28 °C) when kept in captivity and of 65-75% humidity. Females of this species can also reach up to 5–6 inches (130–150 mm) and tend to grow faster than the males too. This species is aggressive towards their prey and also often burrow.
