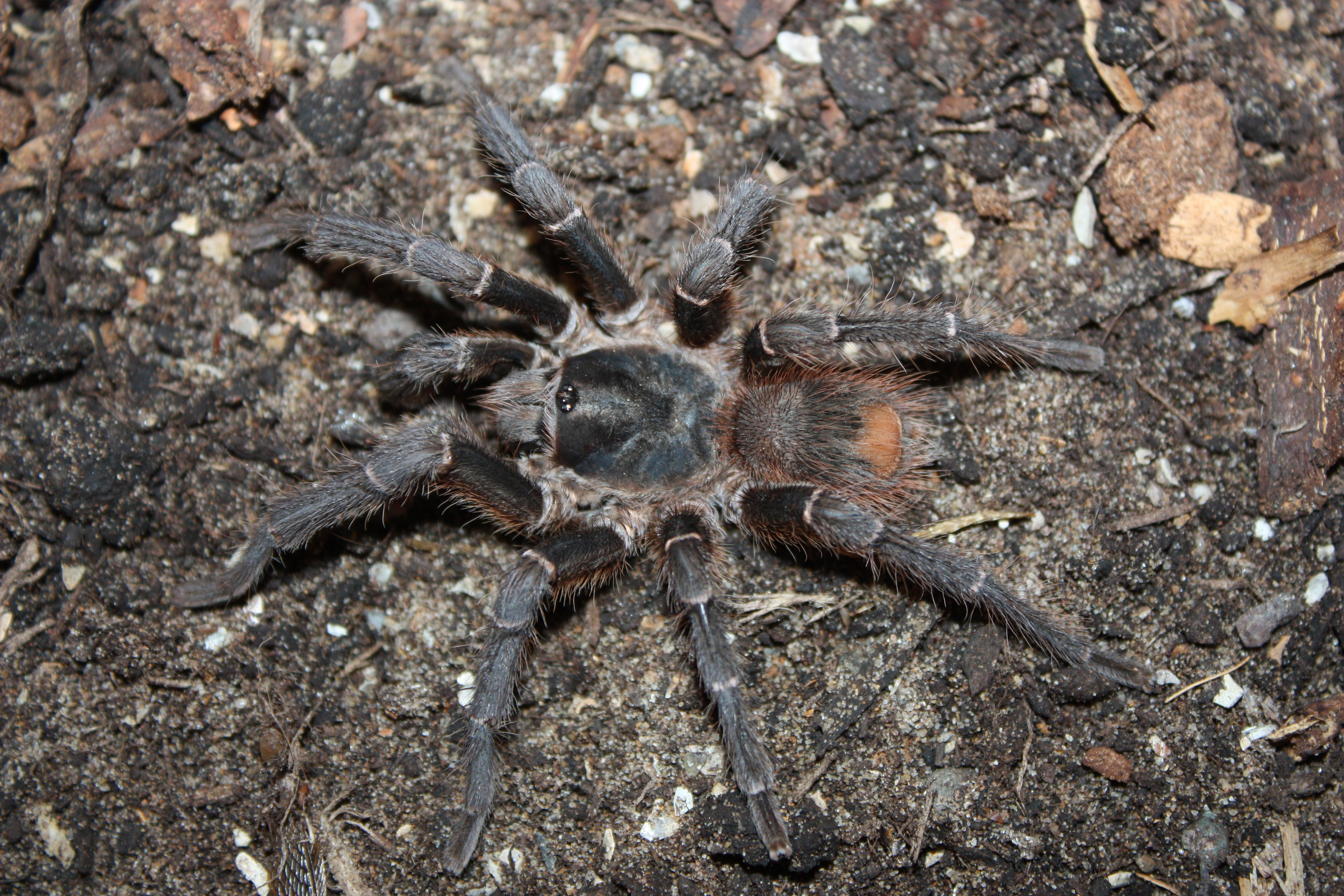
- Adult male Acanthoscurria theraphosoides

Scientific classification
- Kingdom: Animalia
- Phylum: Arthropoda
- Subphylum: Chelicerata
- Class: Arachnida
- Order: Araneae
- Infraorder: Mygalomorphae
- Family: Theraphosidae
- Genus: Acanthoscurria
- Species: A. theraphosoides

Binomial name
- Acanthoscurria theraphosoides (Doleschall, 1871)

Synonyms
- Acanthopalpus theraphosoides Doleschall, 1871; Acanthoscurria ferina Simon, 1892; Acanthoscurria brocklehursti F.O. Pickard-Cambridge, 1896; Trasyphoberus parvitarsis Simon, 1903; Cyrtopholis lycosoides Tullgren, 1905; Trasyphoberus ferina (Simon, 1892)

= Acanthoscurria theraphosoides =

Species of spider

Acanthoscurria theraphosoides is a species of spider from the family Theraphosidae (tarantulas), found in Peru, Bolivia, Brazil, and French Guiana.

== Description ==
F. O. Pickard-Cambridge collected a mature female as his reference specimen (holotype) during his trip to the Lower Amazon, specifically in Pará state, Brazil. He called the species Acanthoscurria brocklehursti, now regarded as synonymous with A. theraphosoides. The specimen was deposited in the Natural History Museum, London. He describes the species from his own live observations as having "Carapace deep brown, clothed with grey-brown velvety pubescence" and "legs entirely clothed with rich chocolate-brown pubescence and long scattered rufous hairs."

== Taxonomy ==
Acanthopalpus theraphosoides was first described by Carl Ludwig Doleschall in 1871. Separately, Acanthoscurria brocklehursti was described by F. O. Pickard-Cambridge in 1896. Following a revision by Paula et al., A. brocklehursti is now treated as a junior synonym of A. theraphosoides.

== Confused species ==
In the exotic pet hobby, there is another larger species often mistakenly traded under this name Acanthoscurria brocklehursti with alternating light and dark banding on the legs. It is sometimes called the giant black and white tarantula because it can reach a leg span of 18–23 cm (7–9 in). Scientifically, this is a thinner banded regional variant of Acanthoscurria geniculata, also from the Amazon basin.
