= Augusto Ruschi =

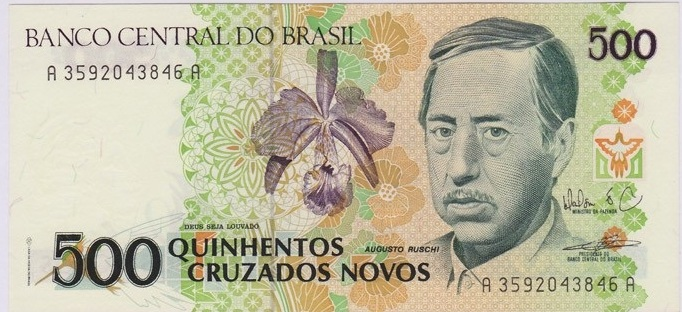
- Ruschi on a Brazilian banknote
- Born: 12 December 1915; Santa Teresa, Espírito Santo, Brazil
- Died: 3 June 1986 (aged 70); Vitória, Espírito Santo, Brazil
- Spouses: Claide; Marilande
- Children: André Ruschi
- Awards: Prêmio Jabuti (Tortoise Award)
- Scientific career
- Fields: Agronomy, biology, ecology

Augusto Ruschi (12 December 1915 — 3 June 1986) was a Brazilian agronomist, ecologist, and naturalist.

Ruschi was interested in the study of plants and animals since childhood, allowing him to know in depth several branches of biology, becoming a respected specialist in hummingbirds and orchids in Brazil. He was a full professor at the Federal University of Rio de Janeiro and a researcher at the National Museum, however, his technical-scientific production has been challenged by current experts. By virtue of his research, he also left a large collection of photographs and produced numerous scientific drawings. He helped fight pests in agriculture, establish several ecological reserves, such as the Caparaó National Park, and spread the word about the wonders of nature. He set up two scientific institutions, namely: the Professor Mello Leitão Biology Museum and the Ruschi Marine Biology Station.

He was a controversial figure, active and notorious defender of the environment, he was involved in several public disputes with companies and authorities for environmental preservation, highlighting the conflict with the Governor of Espírito Santo, Élcio Álvares, in 1977, regarding the installation of a palm heart factory in the Santa Lucia Biological Reserve. He was also a pioneer in combating deforestation in the Amazon and anticipated the harmful effects of monocultural eucalyptus plantations and the use of pesticides, among other contemporary environmental problems.

His contributions to environmentalism and to the sciences, expressed in his actions and in his more than 400 articles and more than 20 scientific books, were acknowledged through the respect he earned among scholars of his time and the many honours he received during his lifetime, and posthumously. In 1994, through federal law, he was granted the title of Patron of Ecology in Brazil, being also one of the world icons of environmental protection.
