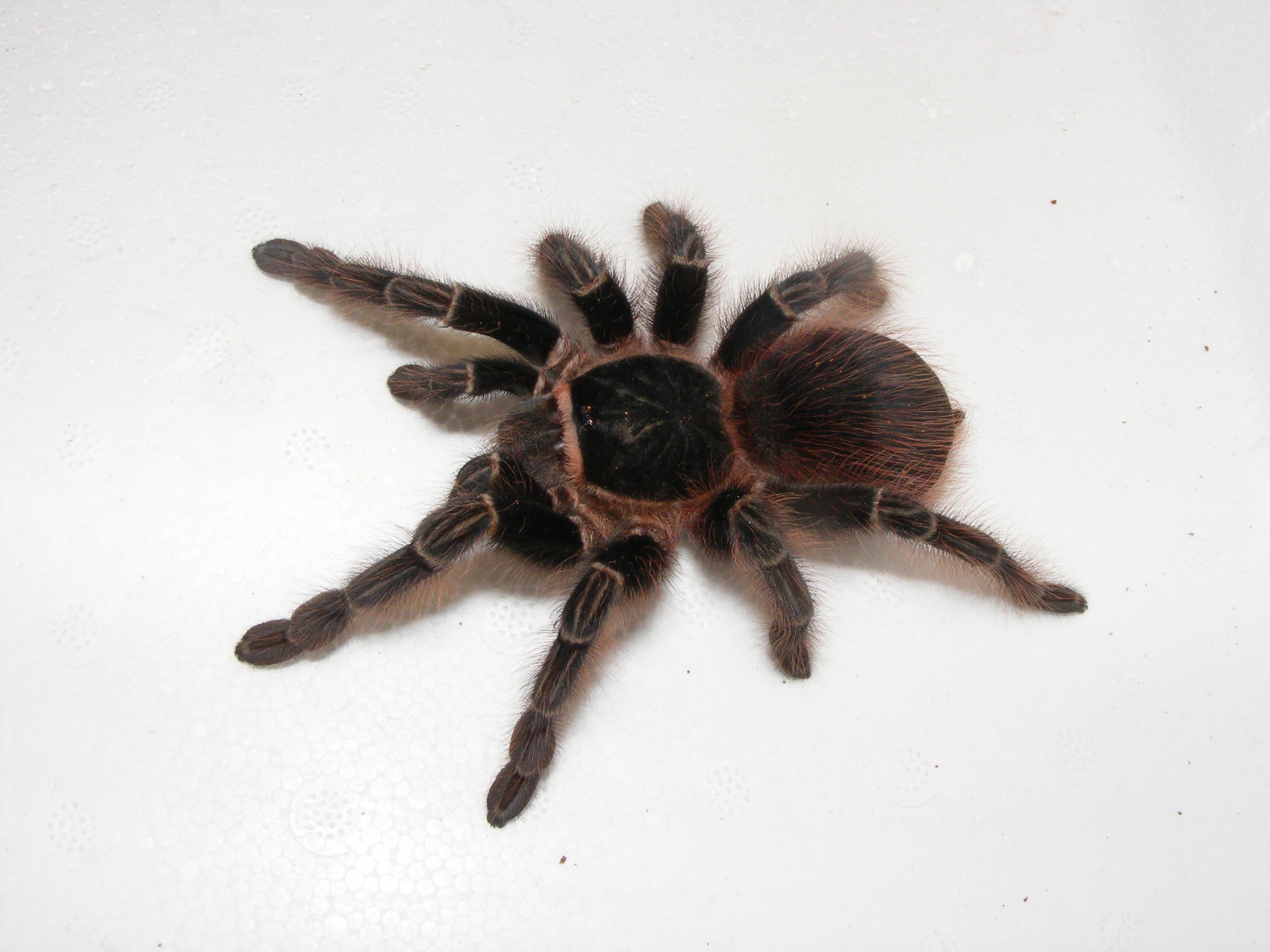

Scientific classification
- Kingdom: Animalia
- Phylum: Arthropoda
- Subphylum: Chelicerata
- Class: Arachnida
- Order: Araneae
- Infraorder: Mygalomorphae
- Family: Theraphosidae
- Genus: Acanthoscurria
- Species: A. chacoana

Binomial name
- Acanthoscurria chacoana Brèthes, 1909

= Acanthoscurria chacoana =

Species of tarantulas

Acanthoscurria chacoana, also known as the Bolivian red rump tarantula, is a fast growing, docile tarantula found in Brazil, Bolivia, Paraguay, and Argentina. It is commonly kept as a pet, preferring 70–80% humidity and a horizontally large enclosure, as it is terrestrial. This species of spider does create burrows and is a reddish-brown with tan stripes on its legs.

== Lifespan ==
Female tarantulas of this species can live up to 20 years, while males tend to only live 3–4.

== Size ==
Specimens of A. chacoana can get up to 7.5 in (190 mm) as adults, but the males tend to be much smaller than the females.
