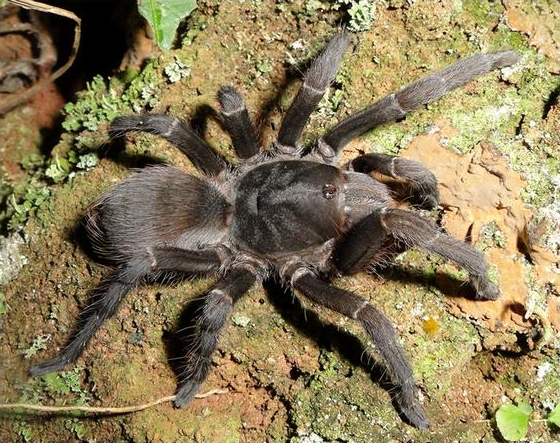
- Acanthoscurria gomesiana ♀

Scientific classification
- Kingdom: Animalia
- Phylum: Arthropoda
- Subphylum: Chelicerata
- Class: Arachnida
- Order: Araneae
- Infraorder: Mygalomorphae
- Family: Theraphosidae
- Genus: Acanthoscurria
- Species: A. gomesiana

Binomial name
- Acanthoscurria gomesiana Mello-Leitão, 1923

= Acanthoscurria gomesiana =

Species of spider

Acanthoscurria gomesiana is a species of tarantula spider first identified in Brazil in 1923. It is known for producing the gomesin peptides, a class of proteins which have found to have anti-tumour and anti-microbial properties.
