= Cândido Firmino de Mello-Leitão =

Brazilian zoologist (1886–1948)

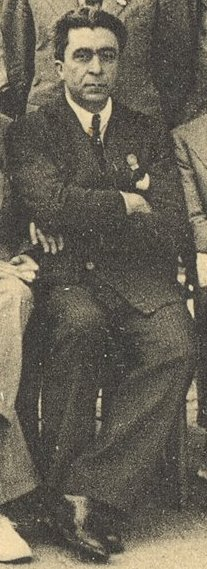
C. de Mello Leitão at the International Congress of Entomology in Madrid, 1935

Cândido Firmino de Mello-Leitão (July 17, 1886 – December 14, 1948) was a Brazilian zoologist who is considered the founder of arachnology in South America, publishing 198 papers on the taxonomy of Arachnida. He was also involved with education, writing high-school textbooks, and contributed to biogeography, with essays on the distribution of Arachnida in the South American continent.

== Biography ==
Cândido Firmino de Mello-Leitão was born on the Cajazeiras Farm, Campina Grande, Paraíba state, Brazil, to Colonel Cândido Firmino and Jacunda de Mello-Leitão. He died in Rio de Janeiro, Brazil. His parents were subsistence farmers, and he had 15 brothers and sisters. He lived most of his childhood at the state of Pernambuco. His first job as a zoologist (1913) was at the Escola Superior de Agricultura e Medicina Veterinária in Piraí, RJ, as a teacher of general Zoology and Systematics. In 1915, he published his first taxonomical paper, with descriptions of some genera and species of spiders from Brazil. He also produced much taxonomic information on the Opiliones, Solifugae, Amblypygi, Uropygi, and smaller orders of arachnids. Mello-Leitão was appointed professor of zoology at the Museu Nacional, Rio de Janeiro in April 1931, where he remained until December 1937.

Among the many species of spiders researched and catalogued by the zoologist there is one in particular which is very intriguing, given its big size, beauty and carnivore habits (it is a bird eater) – the Lasiodora parahybana. The species was discovered and first described in 1917 in the vicinities of the city of Campina Grande, Paraíba, from where it is endemic.

Mello-Leitão received many honor awards and was appointed or elected to distinguished positions during his career. He was president of the Brazilian Academy of Sciences from 1943 to 1945.

On June 6, 1949, his friend Augusto Ruschi inaugurated the Museum of Biology Mello-Leitão in Santa Teresa, Espírito Santo (state).

The "Mello-Leitão Award" is granted by the Brazilian Academy of Sciences.

== Contributions to the taxonomy of Arachnida ==
Below a list of species of spiders discovered, studied and named by the zoologist, as well as the date of discovered and the country where it they are found:

- Avicularia ancylochira, 1923 — Brazil
- Avicularia bicegoi, 1923 — Brazil
- Avicularia cuminami, 1930 — Brazil
- Avicularia juruensis, 1923 — Brazil
- Avicularia nigrotaeniata, 1940 — Guyana
- Avicularia palmicola, 1945 — Brazil
- Avicularia pulchra, 1933 — Brazil
- Avicularia taunayi, 1920 — Brazil
- Iridopelma zorodes, 1926 — Brazil
- Catumiri argentinense, 1941 — Chile, Argentina
- Hemiercus proximus, 1923 — Brazil
- Tapinauchenius violaceus, 1930 — French Guiana, Brazil
- Acanthoscurria chiracantha, 1923 — Brazil
- Acanthoscurria cunhae, 1923 — Brazil
- Acanthoscurria gomesiana, 1923 — Brazil
- Acanthoscurria juruenicola, 1923 — Brazil
- Acanthoscurria melanotheria, 1923 — Brazil
- Acanthoscurria parahybana, 1926 — Brazil
- Acanthoscurria paulensis, 1923 — Brazil
- Acanthoscurria rhodothele, 1923 — Brazil
- Acanthoscurria rondoniae, 1923 — Brazil
- Acanthoscurria violacea, 1923 — Brazil
- Cesonia irvingi, 1944 — Bahamas, United States
- Ctenus vespertilio, 1941 — Colombia
- Cyclosternum garbei, 1923 — Brazil
- Cyriocosmus fasciatus, 1930 — Brazil
- Cyrtopholis zorodes, 1923 — Brazil
- Eupalaestrus spinosissimus, 1923 — Brazil
- Grammostola inermis, 1941 — Argentina
- Grammostola porteri, 1936 (synonym of G. rosea) — Chile
- Grammostola pulchra, 1921 — Brazil
- Hapalopus nigriventris, 1939 — Venezuela
- Hapalopus nondescriptus, 1926 — Brazil
- Hapalotremus cyclothorax, 1923 — Brazil
- Hapalotremus exilis, 1923 — Brazil
- Hapalotremus muticus, 1923 — Brazil
- Hapalotremus scintillans, 1929 — Brazil
- Homoeomma hirsutum, 1935 — Brazil
- Homoeomma montanum, 1923 — Brazil
- Homoeomma uruguayense, 1946 — Uruguay, Argentina
- Lasiodora acanthognatha, 1921 — Brazil
- Lasiodora citharacantha, 1921 — Brazil
- Lasiodora cristata, 1923 — Brazil
- Lasiodora cryptostigma, 1921 — Brazil
- Lasiodora difficilis, 1921 — Brazil
- Lasiodora dolichosterna, 1921 — Brazil
- Lasiodora dulcicola, 1921 — Brazil
- Lasiodora erythrocythara, 1921 — Brazil
- Lasiodora fracta, 1921 — Brazil
- Lasiodora itabunae, 1921 — Brazil
- Lasiodora lakoi, 1943 — Brazil
- Lasiodora mariannae, 1921 — Brazil
- Lasiodora parahybana, 1917 — Brazil
- Lasiodora pleoplectra, 1921 — Brazil
- Lasiodora sternalis, 1923 — Brazil
- Lasiodora subcanens, 1921 — Brazil
- Phormictopus australis, 1941 — Argentina
- Phormictopus ribeiroi, 1923 — Brazil
- Plesiopelma insulare, 1923 — Brazil
- Plesiopelma minense, 1943 — Brazil
- Plesiopelma physopus, 1926 — Brazil
- Plesiopelma rectimanum, 1923 — Brazil
- Proshapalopus anomalus, 1923 — Brazil
- Proshapalopus multicuspidatus, 1929 — Brazil
- Sericopelma fallax, 1923 — Brazil
- Vitalius dubius, 1923 — Brazil
- Vitalius roseus, 1923 — Brazil
- Vitalius sorocabae, 1923 — Brazil
- Vitalius vellutinus, 1923 — Brazil
- Vitalius wacketi, 1923 — Brazil

== List of arachnological works ==
Kury, A.B. & Baptista, Renner L.C., 2004. Arachnological papers published by Cândido Firmino de Mello-Leitão (Arachnida). Publicações Avulsas do Museu Nacional, Rio de Janeiro, 105: 1–17. [Date of publ: October 2004]. PDF
