= Languages of Argentina =

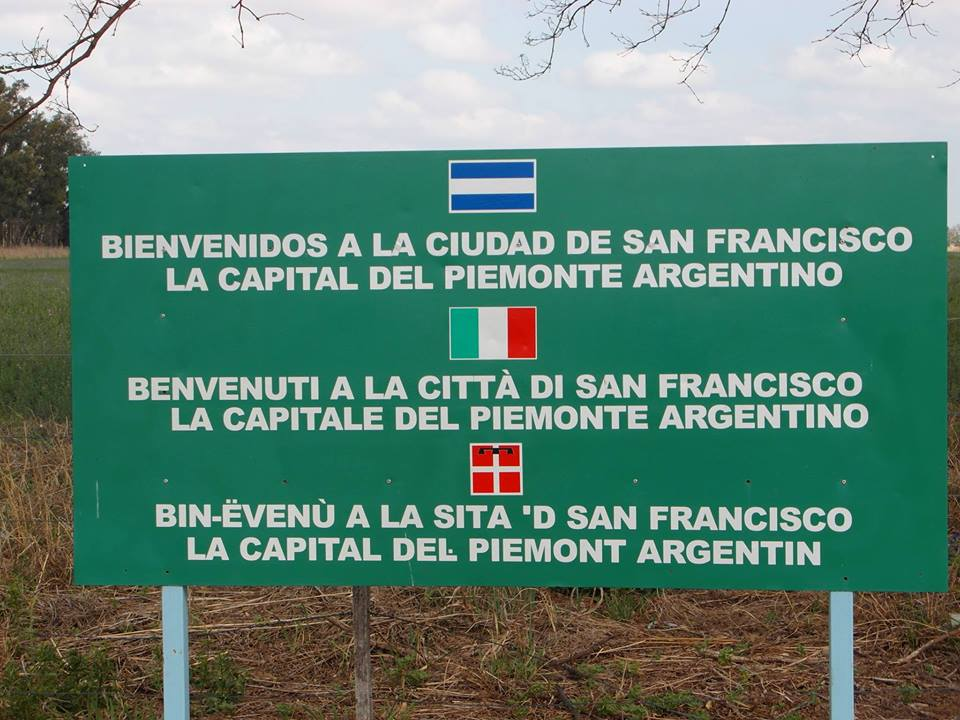
- Sign in San Francisco, Córdoba, in Spanish, Italian and Piedmontese
- Official: Spanish (de facto)
- Indigenous: Tupi-Guarani languages, Mataco–Guaicuru languages, Mapuche, Chaná, Quechua
- Vernacular: Rioplatense Spanish, Lunfardo, Portuñol
- Minority: Italian, English, German, Plautdietsch, Chinese, Welsh
- Foreign: English
- Signed: Argentine Sign Language
- Keyboard layout: Spanish Latinamerican QWERTY

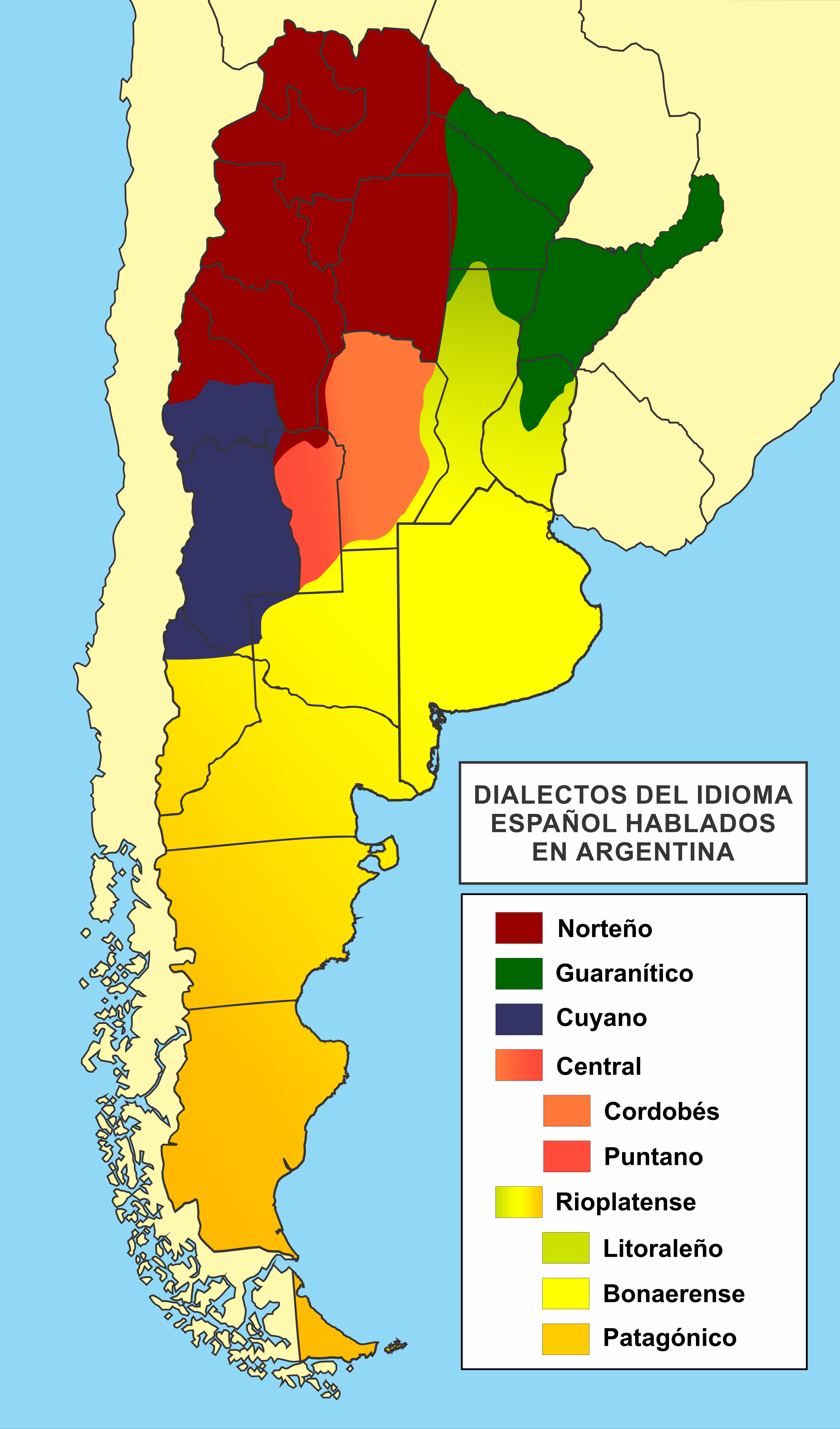
Dialectal variants of the Spanish language in Argentina. The most prevalent dialect in Argentina is Rioplatense, whose speakers are located primarily in the basin of the Río de la Plata, including Buenos Aires Province and the capital of Argentina, with an estimated total 19 million speakers. The second is the "Litoraleño" which is used by people from Santa Fe Province and from Entre Ríos who total five million, and the third is Cordoba/central spoken by people from Córdoba Province and from San Luis Province totaling 3.75 million speakers, though some sources may consider Litoraleño a sub dialect of Rioplatense.

Spanish is the language that is predominantly understood and spoken as a first or second language by nearly all of the population of Argentina. According to the latest estimations, the population is currently greater than 45 million.

English is another important language in Argentina and is obligatory in primary school instruction in various provinces. Argentina is the only Latin American country characterized as "high aptitude" in English, being placed 15th globally in the year 2015, according to a report from the English Aptitude Index. In 2017, Argentina fell ten places from its best position and fell to 25th place, though it continues to be the second highest ranked Ibero-American, after Portugal.

Argentina also boasts 40 indigenous languages; the most widely spoken are Tupí-Guaraní with about 64,000 speakers, Guaycurú with about 49,000 speakers, and Quechua with about 55,000 speakers.

In addition there is Lunfardo, a slang or a type of pidgin with original words from many languages, among these languages are ones from the Italian Peninsula, such as Piedmontese, Ligurian, and others like Italian, Portuguese, etc., and have been seen in the Río de la Plata area since at least 1880. There is also Portuñol, a pidgin of Portuguese and Spanish spoken since approximately 1960 in the areas of Argentina that border Brazil.

Another native language is Argentine Sign Language (LSA), which is signed by deaf communities. It emerged in 1885.

After the above-mentioned languages German follows (around 200,000, including a significant number of the Volga German dialect and of the Plautdietsch language). Multitude of Eurasian and immigrant languages are spoken in their respective ethnic communities throughout the country; these are predominantly namely: European: Albanian, Armenian, Asturian, Basque, Belarusian, Bulgarian, Catalan, Serbo-Croatian, Czech, Danish, Dutch, Estonian, Finnish, French, Galician, Greek, Hungarian, Irish, Latvian, Lithuanian, Macedonian, Norwegian, Occitan, Polish, Portuguese, Romani, Romanian, Russian, Slovene, Swedish, Ukrainian, Welsh, and Yiddish; Asian: Arabic, Chinese, Hebrew, Japanese, Korean, Turkish. Most of these languages have, with the exception of Chinese and Plautdietsch, very few speakers and are usually only spoken in family environments.

In 2026, the town of Caá Catí adopted Guaraní as a co-official language.

== Official language ==
The Republic of Argentina has not established a named official language but Spanish is used in all aspects of government and society, making it de facto official.

Even though the Constitution establishes the jurisdiction of the National Congress "to recognize the ethnic and cultural pre-existence of indigenous peoples of Argentina", the native languages have not been recognized as official, except in the provinces of Chaco and Corrientes. (Note: Constitution, ch. 4, sec. 17 (Wikisource))

Since 1952, The Argentine Academy of Letters, which was founded in 1931, has regularly collaborated with The Royal Spanish Academy to register local variants. The most prevalent dialect in Argentina is Rioplatense, whose speakers are located primarily in the basin of the Río de la Plata. There is also Cuyo Spanish and Cordobés Spanish. In the north, Andean Spanish is spoken and in the northeast there is a great influence from Paraguayan Spanish.

Argentina is one of several Spanish-speaking countries (along with Uruguay, Paraguay, El Salvador, Nicaragua, Honduras, and Costa Rica) that almost universally use what is known as voseo—the use of the pronoun vos instead of tú (the familiar "you") as well as its corresponding verb forms.

A phonetic study conducted by the Laboratory for Sensory Investigations of [CONICET] and the University of Toronto showed that the intonation Porteño Spanish is unlike that of other Spanish varieties, and suggested that it may be a result of convergence with Italian. Italian immigration influenced Lunfardo, the slang spoken in the Río de la Plata region, permeating the vernacular vocabulary of other regions as well.

As in other large countries, the accents vary depending on geographical location. Extreme differences in pronunciation can be heard within Argentina. One notable pronunciation difference found in Argentina is the "sh" sounding y and ll. In most Spanish speaking countries the letters y and ll are pronounced somewhat like the "y" in yo-yo, however in most parts of Argentina they are pronounced like "sh" in English (such as "shoe") or like "zh" (such as the sound the ⟨s⟩ makes in "measure").

In many of the central and north-eastern areas of the country, the trilled /r/ takes on the same sound as the ⟨ll⟩ and ⟨y⟩ ('zh' – a voiced palatal fricative sound, similar to the "s" in the English pronunciation of the word "vision"). For Example, "Río Segundo" sounds like "Zhio Segundo" and "Corrientes" sounds like "Cozhientes".

The ISO639 code for Argentine Spanish is "es-AR".

== Classification ==
The Indo-European languages spoken in Argentina by stable communities fall into five branches: Romance (Spanish, Italian, and Portuguese), West Germanic (English, Plautdietsch and standard German), Celtic languages (Welsh), and Central Indo-Aryan (Romani).

On the other hand, the indigenous languages of Argentina are very diverse and fall into different linguistic families...

Classification of the Indigenous Languages of Argentina
Family	Groups	Language	Territory
Aymaran languages They are a family of two languages of the Central Andes that have been in contact for a long time with the Quechuan Languages and they have influenced each other greatly. In the last decades, more Aymaran speakers have migrated from neighboring countries.
Aymaran languages They are a family of two languages of the Central Andes that have been in contact for a long time with the Quechuan Languages and they have influenced each other greatly. In the last decades, more Aymaran speakers have migrated from neighboring countries.		Aymara	Jujuy
Arawakan languages One of the largest families of languages in South America, it extends through a large part of the subcontinent. The Chané people do not speak Chané anymore, but rather Guarani or Spanish.	Paraná-Mamoré	Chané (†)	Chaco
Charruan languages Poorly documented languages that are difficult to classify. They were thought to be extinct over a century ago, but in 2005 the last semi-speaker of Chaná was found
Charruan languages Poorly documented languages that are difficult to classify. They were thought to be extinct over a century ago, but in 2005 the last semi-speaker of Chaná was found		Chaná	Pampas
Charruan languages Poorly documented languages that are difficult to classify. They were thought to be extinct over a century ago, but in 2005 the last semi-speaker of Chaná was found		Charrúa (†)	Pampas
Chonan languages Family of languages from Patagonia and Tierra de Fuego. Of the four Chonan languages that are known with certainty, there are only less than ten speakers of Tehuelche left. It is possible that these languages are distantly related to Puelche or Gününa Yajüch and with Querandí.	Continental	Teushen (†)	Patagonia
Chonan languages Family of languages from Patagonia and Tierra de Fuego. Of the four Chonan languages that are known with certainty, there are only less than ten speakers of Tehuelche left. It is possible that these languages are distantly related to Puelche or Gününa Yajüch and with Querandí.	Continental	Tehuelche (†)	Patagonia
Chonan languages Family of languages from Patagonia and Tierra de Fuego. Of the four Chonan languages that are known with certainty, there are only less than ten speakers of Tehuelche left. It is possible that these languages are distantly related to Puelche or Gününa Yajüch and with Querandí.	Insular	Haush (†)	Tierra del Fuego
Chonan languages Family of languages from Patagonia and Tierra de Fuego. Of the four Chonan languages that are known with certainty, there are only less than ten speakers of Tehuelche left. It is possible that these languages are distantly related to Puelche or Gününa Yajüch and with Querandí.	Insular	Selkʼnam (†)	Tierra del Fuego
Huarpean languages A small family of languages or two dialects of an isolated language that became extinct in the mid-18th century.
Huarpean languages A small family of languages or two dialects of an isolated language that became extinct in the mid-18th century.		Allentiac (†)	North of Cuyo
Huarpean languages A small family of languages or two dialects of an isolated language that became extinct in the mid-18th century.		Millcayac (†)	South of Cuyo
Huarpean languages A small family of languages or two dialects of an isolated language that became extinct in the mid-18th century.		Comechingon (†)	Sierras Pampeanas
Lule-Vilela languages Vilela is in imminent danger of extinction and Lule became extinct in the 18th century. The relation between the two languages is not unanimously accepted and those that deny the relation attribute the similarities to the contact between the two.
Lule-Vilela languages Vilela is in imminent danger of extinction and Lule became extinct in the 18th century. The relation between the two languages is not unanimously accepted and those that deny the relation attribute the similarities to the contact between the two.		Lule (†)	Gran Chaco
Lule-Vilela languages Vilela is in imminent danger of extinction and Lule became extinct in the 18th century. The relation between the two languages is not unanimously accepted and those that deny the relation attribute the similarities to the contact between the two.		Vilela (†)	Gran Chaco and Santiago del Estero
Mataco-Guaicuru languages There are two groups of languages from Gran Chaco that are spoken in Argentina, Bolivia, Brazil, and Paraguay. It is the most represented family of languages in Argentina.	Matacoan	Chorote	Formosa
Mataco-Guaicuru languages There are two groups of languages from Gran Chaco that are spoken in Argentina, Bolivia, Brazil, and Paraguay. It is the most represented family of languages in Argentina.	Matacoan	Maká	Formosa
Mataco-Guaicuru languages There are two groups of languages from Gran Chaco that are spoken in Argentina, Bolivia, Brazil, and Paraguay. It is the most represented family of languages in Argentina.	Matacoan	Nivaclé	Formosa
Mataco-Guaicuru languages There are two groups of languages from Gran Chaco that are spoken in Argentina, Bolivia, Brazil, and Paraguay. It is the most represented family of languages in Argentina.	Matacoan	Wichí	Gran Chaco, Formosa and Salta
Mataco-Guaicuru languages There are two groups of languages from Gran Chaco that are spoken in Argentina, Bolivia, Brazil, and Paraguay. It is the most represented family of languages in Argentina.	Guaicuru	Abipón (†)	Gran Chaco
Mataco-Guaicuru languages There are two groups of languages from Gran Chaco that are spoken in Argentina, Bolivia, Brazil, and Paraguay. It is the most represented family of languages in Argentina.	Guaicuru	Mocoví	Gran Chaco and Santa Fe
Mataco-Guaicuru languages There are two groups of languages from Gran Chaco that are spoken in Argentina, Bolivia, Brazil, and Paraguay. It is the most represented family of languages in Argentina.	Guaicuru	Pilagá	Gran Chaco and Formosa
Mataco-Guaicuru languages There are two groups of languages from Gran Chaco that are spoken in Argentina, Bolivia, Brazil, and Paraguay. It is the most represented family of languages in Argentina.	Guaicuru	Toba or Qom	Gran Chaco and Formosa
Quechuan languages These languages, of the Central Andes, have had prolonged contact with the Aymaran languages and, therefore, have influenced each other. They were introduced to the current Argentine territory during the expansion of the Incan Empire and the evangelization of Catholic missionaries. The recent migration from neighboring countries has increased the number of Southern Quechuan speakers.	Quechua II	Santiagueño Quechua	Santiago del Estero
Quechuan languages These languages, of the Central Andes, have had prolonged contact with the Aymaran languages and, therefore, have influenced each other. They were introduced to the current Argentine territory during the expansion of the Incan Empire and the evangelization of Catholic missionaries. The recent migration from neighboring countries has increased the number of Southern Quechuan speakers.	Quechua II	Southern Quechua	Jujuy, Salta y Tucumán
Tupian languages The Tupian languages are primarily spoken in the Amazon Basin, but also in Chaco and neighboring areas. Within the Argentine territory, they speak languages from the Guarani groups, some of which come from recent migration from neighboring countries.	Tupi-Guarani languages	Ava Guarani	Misiones
Tupian languages The Tupian languages are primarily spoken in the Amazon Basin, but also in Chaco and neighboring areas. Within the Argentine territory, they speak languages from the Guarani groups, some of which come from recent migration from neighboring countries.	Tupi-Guarani languages	Correntino	Corrientes
Tupian languages The Tupian languages are primarily spoken in the Amazon Basin, but also in Chaco and neighboring areas. Within the Argentine territory, they speak languages from the Guarani groups, some of which come from recent migration from neighboring countries.	Tupi-Guarani languages	Old Guarani (†)	Gran Chaco
Tupian languages The Tupian languages are primarily spoken in the Amazon Basin, but also in Chaco and neighboring areas. Within the Argentine territory, they speak languages from the Guarani groups, some of which come from recent migration from neighboring countries.	Tupi-Guarani languages	Eastern Bolivian Guarani	Formosa and Salta
Tupian languages The Tupian languages are primarily spoken in the Amazon Basin, but also in Chaco and neighboring areas. Within the Argentine territory, they speak languages from the Guarani groups, some of which come from recent migration from neighboring countries.	Tupi-Guarani languages	Kaiwá	Misiones
Tupian languages The Tupian languages are primarily spoken in the Amazon Basin, but also in Chaco and neighboring areas. Within the Argentine territory, they speak languages from the Guarani groups, some of which come from recent migration from neighboring countries.	Tupi-Guarani languages	Mbyá	Misiones
Tupian languages The Tupian languages are primarily spoken in the Amazon Basin, but also in Chaco and neighboring areas. Within the Argentine territory, they speak languages from the Guarani groups, some of which come from recent migration from neighboring countries.	Tupi-Guarani languages	Tapiete	Salta
Isolated languages Many have tried to group these languages into more appropriate families but the results have been inconclusive. For example, people have tried to group Mapuche with the Mayan languages and the Penutian languages of South America, and with the Arawakan languages, Uru-Chipaya languages and various other language families of South America.
Isolated languages Many have tried to group these languages into more appropriate families but the results have been inconclusive. For example, people have tried to group Mapuche with the Mayan languages and the Penutian languages of South America, and with the Arawakan languages, Uru-Chipaya languages and various other language families of South America.		Kunza (†)	Northwest
Isolated languages Many have tried to group these languages into more appropriate families but the results have been inconclusive. For example, people have tried to group Mapuche with the Mayan languages and the Penutian languages of South America, and with the Arawakan languages, Uru-Chipaya languages and various other language families of South America.		Mapuche	Patagonia
Isolated languages Many have tried to group these languages into more appropriate families but the results have been inconclusive. For example, people have tried to group Mapuche with the Mayan languages and the Penutian languages of South America, and with the Arawakan languages, Uru-Chipaya languages and various other language families of South America.		Puelche (†)	Patagonia
Isolated languages Many have tried to group these languages into more appropriate families but the results have been inconclusive. For example, people have tried to group Mapuche with the Mayan languages and the Penutian languages of South America, and with the Arawakan languages, Uru-Chipaya languages and various other language families of South America.		Yaghan (†)	Tierra del Fuego
Unclassified languages Additionally there exists a combination of languages with rare documentation and references to languages of extinct villages, that cannot be classified because of a lack of information.
Unclassified languages Additionally there exists a combination of languages with rare documentation and references to languages of extinct villages, that cannot be classified because of a lack of information.		Cacán (†)	Northwest
Unclassified languages Additionally there exists a combination of languages with rare documentation and references to languages of extinct villages, that cannot be classified because of a lack of information.		Old Mapuche (†)	Patagonia
Unclassified languages Additionally there exists a combination of languages with rare documentation and references to languages of extinct villages, that cannot be classified because of a lack of information.		Querandí (†)	Pampas
Unclassified languages Additionally there exists a combination of languages with rare documentation and references to languages of extinct villages, that cannot be classified because of a lack of information.		Sanavirón (†)	Northwest and Sierras Pampeanas

(†): extinct language

== Living languages ==
In addition to Spanish, the following living languages are registered in Argentina with local growth:

=== Other European languages ===
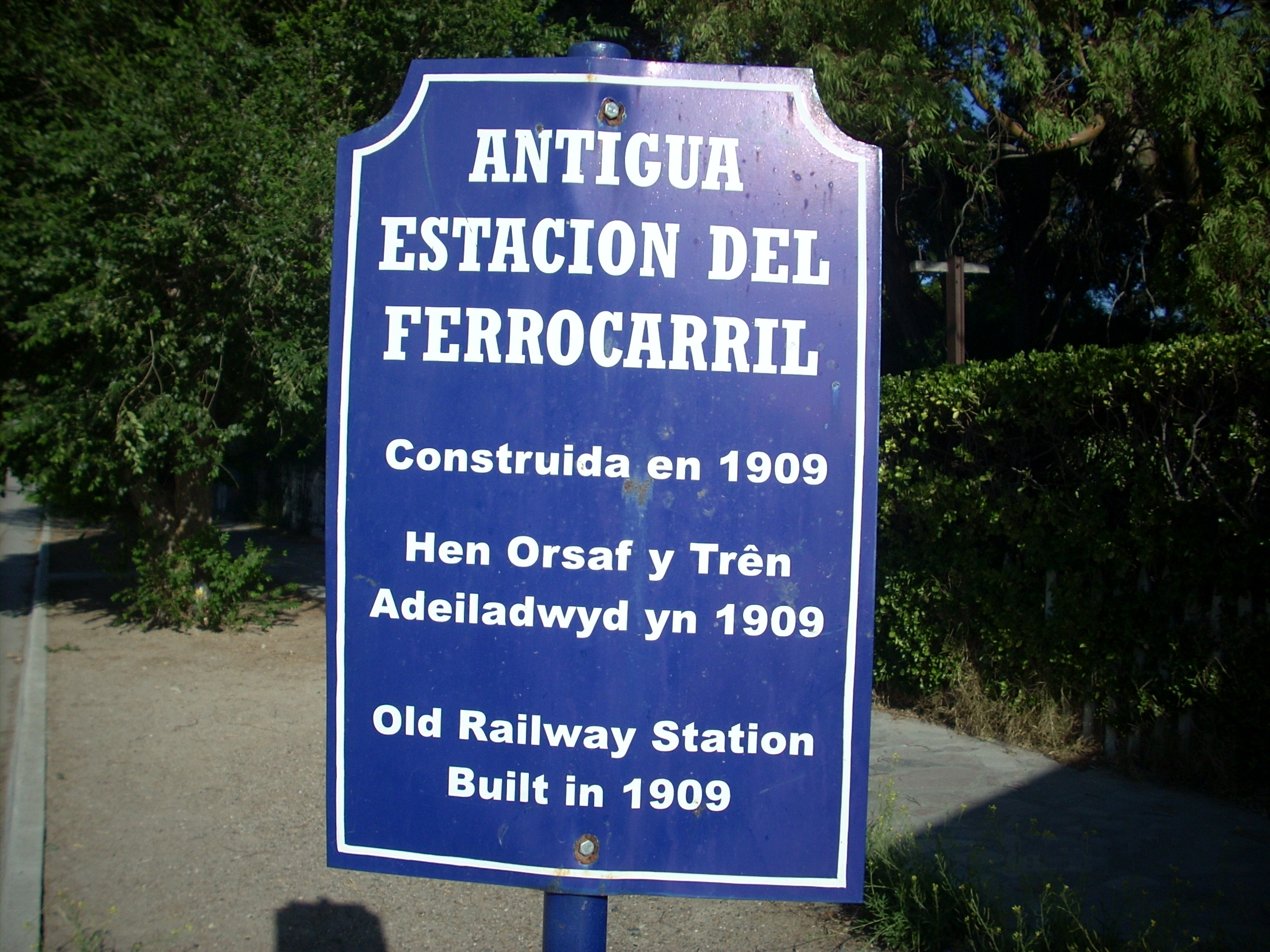
Spanish–Welsh–English sign in Gaiman, Chubut

- Italian is spoken by more than 1.5 million people in Argentina; it is the second most spoken native language in the nation. (Note: Many elder people also speak a macaronic language of Italian and Spanish called Cocoliche, which was originated by the Italian immigrants in the late 19th century.) Italian immigration, which effectively began in the middle of the 19th century and reached its peak in the first two decades of the 20th century, made a lasting and significant impact on the pronunciation and vernacular of Argentina's variety of Spanish, giving it an Italian flair. In fact, Italian dialects (not Standard Italian) have contributed so much to Rioplatense that many foreigners mistake it for Italian.
- Portuñol is spoken in areas that border Brazil. It is a pidgin of Spanish and Portuguese.
- German conserved by the descendants of the immigrants coming directly from Germany as well as other German-speaking countries such as Switzerland and Austria. Descendants of Volga Germans of the Volga River in Russia, speak German especially in the Santa Fe and Entre Ríos provinces, part of La Pampa, and various sectors of the Buenos Aires Province.
- Lunfardo, a dialect that originated in Buenos Aires, is strongly influenced by immigrant languages; primarily by dialects from different Italian regions, but also from Portuguese, Galician, French, English, and Yiddish. They provided numerous lexical and syntactic elements to the Argentine language, as well as the typical pronunciation of Rioplatense Spanish. Lunfardo has exercised a strong influence on the informal speech throughout the country, especially through its use in tango lyrics and Porteño poetry.
- Welsh spoken in Patagonia: Indo-European language of the Brittonic Celtic languages group, spoken as a second language by descendants of Welsh immigrants from the second half of the 19th century) in Chubut Province. An estimation in 2017 indicates that the number of speakers was no greater than 5,000.
- Catalan is spoken by around 200,000 people in Argentina today, which includes the Mallorcan dialect of San Pedro.
- Plautdietch or low German, spoken by Mennonite colonies disseminated especially in the La Pampa Province, although it is also spoken in small communities in other provinces.
- English is the native language of the population of the Falkland Islands. The islands are Disputed territory between Argentina and the United Kingdom.
- See also: Belgranodeutsch, Paraná-Wolga-Deutsch, and Argentinien-schwyzertütsch dialect.

=== Sign language ===
Argentine Sign Language is understood by around two million deaf people of Argentina, their instructors, descendants, and others. There are different regional variants.

=== Quechuan languages ===
Southern Quechua distribution

Southern Quechua comes from the family of Quechuan languages. There are seven variations present that are marked by their geographical origin, including:

- South Bolivian Quechua is spoken by inhabitants of Puna and their descendants. This same variety is spoken in all of Jujuy, Salta, and Tucumán; after Spanish it is the second most widespread language of the country and the most important Indigenous language of the Americas. In 2004, there were 5,100 speakers.
- Santiagueño Quechua: which is different from Bolivian Quechua, though it has an 81 percent lexical similarity, is spoken by 100,000 people, according to data from Censabella (1999), even though other estimations raise the figure to 140,000 or 160,000 speakers in the Santiago del Estero Province, southeast of the Salta Province and Buenos Aires. A department for its study and conservation exists in the National University of Santiago del Estero. The smallest calculation of talks about a minimum of 60,000 speakers in 2000. Its speakers are currently composed of a Creoyle population that does not self-recognize as indigenous (even though it admits an indigenous past).

=== Tupi-Guarani languages ===
In the provinces of Corrientes, Misiones, Chaco, Formosa, Entre Ríos, and Buenos Aires dialects of Guarani are spoken or known by nearly one million people, including Paraguayan immigrants that speak Paraguayan dialects of Guarani or Jopara. In Corrientes, the Argentine Guarani dialect was decreed co-official in 2004 and made obligatory in educational instruction and the government.

- Chiripa is a language family of Tupi-Guarani, subgroup I. There are a few speakers in the Misiones Province and among Paraguayan immigrants.
- Mbyá is from the Tupi-Guarani family, subgroup I. It has a 75 percent lexical similarity with Guarani. In 2012, some 3,900 speakers were counted in the Misiones Province.
- Eastern Bolivian Guarani is also from the Tupi-Guarani family, subgroup I. Some 15,000 speakers in the provinces of Salta and Formosa.
- Correntino or Argentine Guarani pertains to the Tupi-Guarani family. It is spoken (together with Spanish) by nearly 70 percent of the population with an origin from the Corrientes Province (around 350,000 speakers). The Correntino government decreed in 2004 the co-officiality of the Guarani language and its obligatory use in teaching and government, even though it still has not been regulated.
- Kaiwá, called pai tavyterá in Paraguay, is from the Tupi-Guarani family, subgroup I. It is spoken by no more than 510 people in Misiones Province.
- Tapieté from the Tupi-Guarani family, subgroup I, is spoken by some 100 speakers of a village near Tartagal, Salta.
- Missionary Guarani Jesuit was an old variety of Guarani spoken by Jesuit Missionaries became extinct around 1800.

=== Mapuche ===
The Mapuche language is an isolated language that had approximately 8,400 speakers in the provinces of Neuquén, Río Negro, Chubut, and Santa Cruz in 2004, with an ethnic population of 110,000 people.

=== Aymara ===
Central Aymara is a language of the Aymaran group, spoken by 4,100 inhabitants of Jujuy, of the North of Salta, besides the immigrants of Puna and of Peru.

=== Mataco-Guaicuru languages ===
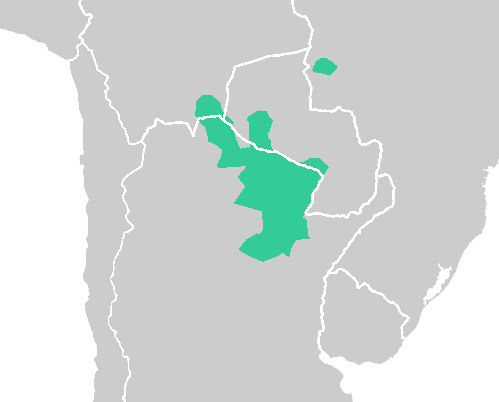
Extension of the Mataco-Guaicuru languages

From the Mataco or Mataguyao group:

- Iyojwa'ja Chorote, Choroti, Yofuaha or Eklenjuy is from the Mataco-Guaicuru family and is a distinct language from Chorote Iyo'wujwa. It was spoken in 2007 by some 800 people in the Salta Province.
- Chorote iyo'wujwa, Ch'orti', Manjuy, Majui is from the Mataco-Guaicuru family. There were some 1,500 speakers accounted for in 2007, 50 percent of which were monolingual.
- Nivaclé is from the Mataco-Guaicuru family, It has about 200 speakers in the Northeast of the Formosa Province. The term chulupí and similar terms are pejoratives and are like the word guaycurú (that in Guarani means something like 'barbarians') which comes from the Guarani invaders.
- Wichí Lhamtés Güisnay is from the Mataco-Guaicuru family and is spoken by some 27,000 people in the Pilcomayo River area, Formosa. The term mataco used to name the languages and towns of the Wichí people is a pejorative and comes from the invaders that were speakers of Runasimi (Quechua).
- Wichí Lhamtés Vejoz is from the Mataco-Guaicuru family. There are calculated to be 32,000 speakers distributed throughout the Chaco, Formosa, and Salta Provinces. Its main area of influence, in general, is found at the west of the area of the Toba people, along the superior course of the Pilcomayo River. It is unintelligible with other languages of Gran Chaco, and is also spoken in Bolivia.

From the Guaicuru group:

- Mocoví is from the Mataco-Guaicuru family. In 2012, there were some 2,800 speakers in Formosa, in the south of Chaco and the Northeast of the Santa Fe Province.
- Pilagá is from the Mataco-Guaicuru family and is spoken by some 2,000 to 5,000 people in the basins of the Pilcomayo and Bermejo rivers, providences Formosa and Chaco. In 2004, it was spoken by 4,000 people.
- Qom is also from the Mataco-Guaicuru family. Spoken in the year 2006 by 40,000 to 60,000 people in the East of Formosa and Chaco. In 2000 it was spoken by 21,410 indigenous people (19,800 in Argentina).

== Extinct languages ==
Approximate distribution of languages in the southern tip of South America in times of the Conquest

In addition to surviving indigenous languages, before the contact with Europeans and during some time during the Colonization of the Americas in Argentina they spoke the following languages, that are currently extinct:

- Abipón is from the Mataco-Guaicuru family and was spoken by the Abipón people, and was related to Kadiweu. There do not appear to be living speakers of this language.
- Cacán was spoken by the Diaguita and Calchaquí people in northern Argentina and Chile. It became extinct during the late 17th century or early 18th century. The language was documented by the Jesuit Alonso de Bárcena, but the manuscript is lost. Genetic affiliation of the language remains unclear, and due to the extremely limited number of known words, it has not been possible to conclusively link it to any existing language family.
- Chané is from that Arawakan language family, without a subgroup classification. It has been compared to Guana or Kashika language of Paraguay, or Terêna from Brazil, but both are distinct. It was spoken in Salta some 300 years ago. The ethnic group is named Izoceño, and now they speak Guarani.
- Kunza was the language of the Atacama people and is also extinct in Chile. Due to the lack of information it is considered an isolated language.
- Henia-Camiare was spoken by the Comechingón people. There are not sufficient elements to establish its connection to another language, nor is it possible to try to reconstruct it.
- Querandí is the language of the old inhabitants of Pampas also known as the Querandí people. Its existence as the only language is speculative. The few known words of the language have been related to Puelche and the Chonan languages.
- Allentiac and Millcayac are languages from the Huarpean family that were spoken in the Cuyo region. The shortage of remaining elements hinders better classification of these languages.
- Lule-toconoté is considered to be of the Lule-Vilela family. Some authors affirm that Lule and Toconoté language were not the same language, spoken by the people that inhabited part of what is today known as Santiago del Estero and by those that migrated to Chaco in the mid-17th century.
- Selkʼnam is from the Chonan family that went extinct in the 1990s or early 2000s.
- Tehuelche is from the Chonan family that went extinct in 2019.
- Puelche is possibly loosely related to the Chonan languages. Rodolfo Casamiquela worked with the last speakers in the middle of the 20th century.
- Yaghan was spoken by aboriginal people in the Southern coastal areas of Tierra del Fuego. It became extinct in Argentina in the beginning of the 20th century, although it was conserved in a grand dictionary elaborated by Thomas Bridges and some important words gave name to places in Argentina such as Ushuaia, Lapataia, Tolhuin, etc. Cristina Calderón is an elderly Chilean woman living in Navarino Island, and the last living full-bloded Yaghan person; after the death of her sister Úrsula in 2005, Cristina became the last living native speaker of the Yaghan language.
- Missionary Guarani was spoken in the area of the Misiones Jesuit Guaranies, between 1632 and 1767, disappearing permanently around 1870, but left important written documents.
- Manek'enk (or Haush), the language of the Haush people, was spoken on the far eastern tip of the island of Tierra del Fuego. It was part of the Chonan language family. Before 1850, an estimated 300 people spoke Manek'enk; the last speaker died around 1920.

== See also ==
- Demographics of Argentina
- Indigenous peoples in Argentina
- Immigration to Argentina
- List of indigenous languages of Argentina
