= List of Indigenous languages of Argentina =

This is a list of Indigenous languages that are or were spoken in the present territory of Argentina.

Although the official language of Argentina is Spanish, several Indigenous languages are in use. Most are spoken only within their respective Indigenous communities, some with very few remaining speakers. Others, especially Aymara, Quechua (South Bolivian Quechua and Santiago del Estero Quichua), Toba (Qom) and Guaraní (Western Argentine Guaraní, Paraguayan Guaraní, Mbyá Guaraní), are alive and in common use in specific regions. Finally, some such as Abipón and Yaghan, are now completely extinct. Since 2004 the Guaraní language is official, together with Spanish, in the northeastern Corrientes Province.

Aboriginal languages in Argentina
           |____ Living
           |       |____ Tupi–Guaraní family
           |       |       |_Guaraní subfamily
           |       |          |___ Subgroup I
           |       |                   |___ Paraguayan Guaraní
           |       |                   |___ Western Guaraní (Avá Guaraní or "chiriguano")
           |       |                   |___ Mbyá Guaraní
           |       |                   |___ Chiripá
           |       |                   |___ Kaiwá [+]
           |       |                   |___ Tapieté
           |       |____ Guaycuruan family
           |       |          |___ Qom group
           |       |                   |___ Mocoví
           |       |                   |___ Pilagá
           |       |                   |___ Toba
           |       |____ Mataguayo ("Mataco") family
           |       |          |____Wichí group ("Mataco")
           |       |          |        |___ Nocten (Oktenay)
           |       |          |        |___ Güisnay (Wenhayéy)
           |       |          |        |___ Vejoz (Wehwos)
           |       |          |____Nivaklé group ("Chulupí")
           |       |          |        |___ Forest Nivaklé (Yita'a lhavós)
           |       |          |        |___ River Nivaklé (Chishamne and Shichaam lhavos)
           |       |          |____Chorote group
           |       |                   |___ Jo'wuwa or Iyo'wujwa (Manjui)
           |       |                   |___ Yofwaja or Iyojwa'ja (Eklenjui)
           |       |____ Quechua family
           |       |          |____Quechua II C
           |       |                    |___ Southern Bolivian (Kolla)
           |       |                    |___ Santiago del Estero Quichua
           |       |____ Araucanian family
           |       |          |_____________ Mapudungun (Mapuche)
           |       |____ Isolated and unclassified
           |                  |_____________ Aymara
           |                  |_____________ Yagan, Yámana or Háusi-kúta
           |____________ Endangered or nearly extinct
           |               |____ Lule–Vilela family
           |               |          |_____ Vilela [*]
           |               |____ Isolated and unclassified
           |                          |_____ Gennaken ("Puelche")
           |___ Extinct (an incomplete list)
                           |____ Arawakan family
                           |          |_____ Chané
                           |____ Charruan (?)
                           |          |_____ Güenoa
                           |          |_____ Chaná (?)
                           |____ Guaicuruan family
                           |          |_____ Abipón
                           |          |_____ Mbayá
                           |          |_____ Payaguá
                           |          |_____ Mbeguá (?)
                           |____ Lule–Vilela family
                           |          |_____ Lule
                           |____ Chon family
                           |          |_____ Manek'enk or Haush
                           |          |_____ Teushen           |               
                           |          |_____ Aönikën ("Tehuelche")
                           |          |_____ Śelknam ("Ona")
                           |____ Isolated and unclassified
                                      |___ Huarpe group
                                      |         |___ Allentiac or Alyentiyak
                                      |         |___ Millcayac or Milykayak
                                      |_____ Toconoté
                                      |_____ Omaguaca
                                      |_____ Cacán (Diaguita-Calchaquí)
                                      |_____ Kunza, or Likanantaí (Atacameño)
                                      |_____ Henia-camiare or "Comechingon"
                                      |_____ Sanavirón
                                      |_____ Het

[+] Dubious. Fabre states (with convincing arguments) that no Kaiwá live in Argentina. [*] Some authors give this languages as extinct. (?) Tentative classification

== Living languages ==
- Aymara
- Caiwá (Kaiwá)
- Chiriguano
- Chiripá
- Chorote
- Guaraní
- Mapudungun
- Wichí (Wichí Lhamtés)
- Mocoví
- Nivaclé (Chulupi)
- Pilagá
- Quechua
- Tapieté
- Toba Qom

== Extinct languages ==
A large number of languages once spoken in Argentina have disappeared. According to Censabella (1999), two thirds of the languages spoken when the Spaniards arrived became extinct. In some cases, the languages disappeared along with the ethnic groups that spoke them; in other, the acculturation and transculturation phenomena associated with deep changes in the living conditions of the indigenous peoples caused the extinction, even if a number of individuals of the ethnical group still survive.

- Abipón, from the Guaykuruan family, somewhat related to Kadiwéu of Brazil. No living speakers of this language are known.
- Chané, from the Arawakan family. It has been sometimes compared with Guana or Kashika language of Paraguay, and also with the Terena of Brazil, but both are different. Chané was spoken about 300 years ago in the north-east of Salta Province; the ethnical group, now called Izoceño, became subject as vassals to the Avá Guaraní people, and the language was lost. All surviving Chané individuals speak Western Guaraní.
- Güenoa (or Wenoa) and Chaná languages, of Charrúan stock, were spoken in today's central-eastern Argentina and Uruguay. Charruan languages became extinct by the beginning of the 19th century west of Uruguay River, and around 1830 in the eastern shores of the same river.
- Kunza (also Cunza, Likanantaí, Lipe, Ulipe or Atacameño), probably an isolated language, was spoken in northwestern Argentina, northeastern Chile and Bolivia, in and around the region of Atacama up to Bolivian Salar de Uyuni by the Lickan-amtay (Atacameño) people. It is almost certainly extinct in Chile too.
- Henia-Camiare or Hênia-Kamiare, sometimes considered as two different languages, was spoken by the ethnic group of the same name, known by Spaniards as "comechingones". The extant elements of this language (some toponyms and plant names) are not enough to establish its genetic relationships, nor to attempt a reconstruction.
- Het was the language spoken by the original dwellers of the Pampas, known as Pampas or Querandíes, before they became intermixed with peoples of Mapuche origin and progressively switched to Mapudungun. Its very existence as a unique language (by opposition to a group) is merely speculative.
- Allentiac or Alyentiyak and Millcayac or Milykayak languages belonged to the Huarpe or Warpe family and were spoken in the Cuyo region in central-western Argentina. The scarcity of remaining elements prevents accurate classification or reconstruction.
- Lule, supposed to be part of the Lule–Vilela family, was spoken by peoples living in today's Salta Tucumán and Santiago del Estero provinces. Only a few toponyms and names remain, but their precise meaning is often obscure. However, the language is fairly well documented in a vocabulary and grammar composed by the Jesuit Antonio Machoni in 1732.
- Tonocoté, sometimes confused with Lule, was spoken by a settled people dwelling in western and central regions of today's Santiago del Estero Province. There is some speculation among scholars about the possible Arawakan origin of that ethnic group, while other sources state that they were switching to Quechua in the 16th century. No evidence of the language has survived.
- Yaghan, Yámana, Háusi-Kúta or Yagán is a language spoken by indigenous peoples of southern shores and islands of Tierra del Fuego. A very analytical language, it had an extensive vocabulary. In Argentina Yaghan became extinct at the beginning of the 20th century, but lexicons and early recordings remain. It is recognised in a number of well known toponyms as Ushuaia, Lapataia, Tolhuin, etc. Some elder speakers (between 1 and 5) remain in Chile, where the language is nearly extinct.
- Selkʼnam (Ona)
- Puelche
- Tehuelche language
- Vilela language

Other extinct languages are known just by the ethnic group that spoke them, since very scarce (if any) linguistic material remains. Among them: Omaguaca; Sanavirón; several languages probably belonging to the Guaycurú family but known by their Guaraní ethnonyms as Mbayá, Payaguá, Minuané, Mbeguá, Timbú, Corondá, Quiloazá and Colastiné; and others related to the Chon stock, as Manek'enk and Teushen.

== See also ==
- List of indigenous languages of South America
