= Languages of Chile =

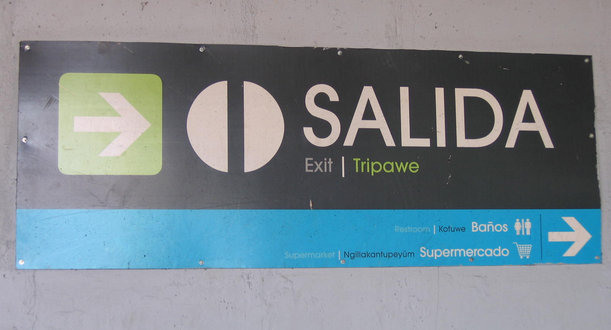
- Sign in Puerto Montt in Spanish, English and Mapuche
- Official: Spanish (de facto)
- Indigenous: Currently spoken: Aymara; Kawésqar; Mapudungun; Quechua; Rapa Nui; Cacán; Extinct or sleeping languages: Chono; Gününa këna; Kunza; Selkʼnam; Tehuelche; Yaghan
- Regional: Croatian; Greek; Italian; English; French; Kreyòl; German; Romani
- Vernacular: Chilean Spanish, Patagónico
- Foreign: English, German, French, Italian, Portuguese
- Signed: Signed Spanish; Chilean Sign Language (LSCh)
- Keyboard layout: Spanish Latinamerican QWERTY

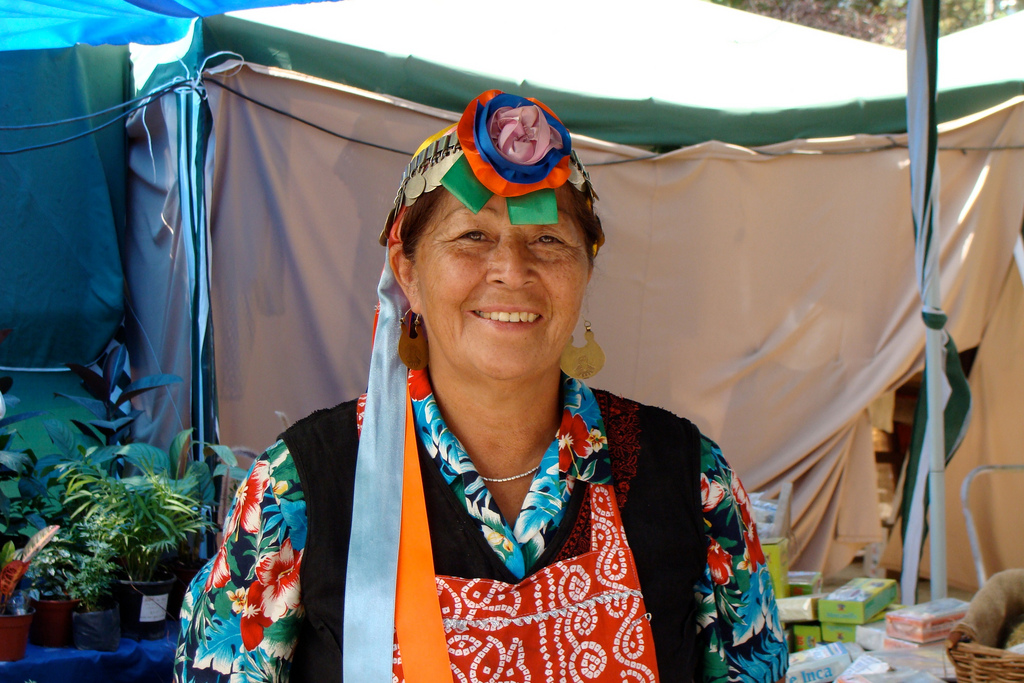
A Mapuche woman in traditional dress

Spanish is the de facto official and administrative language of Chile. It is spoken by 99.3% of the population in the form of Chilean Spanish, as well as Andean Spanish. Spanish in Chile is also referred to as "castellano". Although an officially recognized Hispanic language does not exist at the governmental level, the Constitution itself, as well as all official documents, are written in this language.

Indigenous peoples make up 4.58% of the Chilean population according to the 2002 Census, and the major languages of the population are as follows: Mapuche is spoken by an estimated 100,000–200,000 people; Aymara by 20,000 individuals; Quechua by 8,200 individuals; and Rapa Nui by 3,390 people. However, it is not explicit whether all these speakers use the language as their primary language.

According to Law 19253, also known as "The Indigenous Law" (1993), indigenous languages are officially recognized for use and conservation, in addition to Spanish, in the zones in which they are spoken. They can be used for instruction, the promotion of media communication, as names in the Civil Registry, as well as for artistic and cultural promotion.

Bilingual programs in areas occupied by indigenous communities are also under development. However, these programs exist only as small, isolated projects dedicated to the maintenance and promotion of indigenous languages, specifically Mapuche and Aymara, both with varying degrees of success.

== Indigenous languages of Chile ==
In Chile, there are 15 different linguistic dialects spoken that could be considered distinct languages. These languages are varied, and in Chile—unlike other Southern American countries—no large linguistic family exists. Therefore, all indigenous languages are isolated or belong to small families of three or four languages.

=== Indigenous languages currently spoken ===
- Mapuche: Mainly spoken in the Biobío, Araucanía, Metropolitan, and Los Ríos regions by 381,762 people, as of the year 2024, with different levels of linguistic competency. The Chesungun or Huilliche dialect, spoken by only 2,000 Huilliche people in the Los Lagos region, is a divergent dialect that some experts consider a distinct language from Mapuche. 718,000 people of a total Chilean population of 17,574,003 are Mapuche.
- Aymara: Spoken in 2024 by 60,605 people in the Arica and Parinacota regions of Tarapacá. It is close to Bolivian Aymara.
- Chilean Quechua, one of the varieties of Southern Quechua: Considered identitical to Sub-Bolivian, it is spoken by 39,430 people in 2024 in the region between Antofagasta and Bolivia.Within the Peruvian immigrants residing in established big cities, there are also speakers of distinct Quechuan dialects of Peru.
- Rapa Nui: Used by 7,006 speakers in 2024, majority of speakers are of Easter Island, and a few reside in continental cities like Valparaíso or Santiago.

=== Indigenous languages in danger of extinction ===
- Kawésqar: Spoken by 656 people during the 2024 census, mainly in Puerto Edén.
- Kunza: Spoken in 2024 by around 2,616 Atacameño people around San Pedro de Atacama. It disappeared during the 20th century, and only a few hundred words are remembered. Currently, work is being done to recover it.
- Cacán: The language spoken by the Diaguita people in the North region of Chile.

=== Extinct indigenous languages ===
- Yaghan: Spoken in 2024 by 785 people. In Puerto Williams, Cristina Calderón, the last native speaker, died in 2022. She is the person who created the dictionary for the continuation and survival of the Yaghan language.
- Chono: It is conserved in only one linguistic registry and is connected to Chiloé and the Guaitecas Islands; it is completely unrelated to any other known language.
- Gününa këna: Formerly spoken by the Gününa küne or Puelche people.
- Selkʼnam (Ona): Spoken by the Selkʼnam people on the island of Tierra del Fuego, this language disappeared in Chile during the 20th century, and in Argentina during the 21st century.
- Tehuelche: Spoken by the Aonikenk or Tehuelches people, this language disappeared in Chile during the 20th century and is dwindling in Argentina. Extinct in 2019.

=== Classification of indigenous languages ===
The native languages of Chile belong to four or five linguistic families. In addition, half a dozen other languages are known, including isolated and unclassified languages, many of which are extinct today (indicated by the sign †). The following list includes more than a dozen indigenous languages amongst living languages and extinct languages in the country:

Classification of Indigenous Chilean Languages
Family	Group		Language	Territory
Aymaran A widely spoken language, the southern branch of Chile still has many speakers.			Aymara	Arica and Parinacota, Tarapacá
Austronesian An extended linguistic family of the Pacific Ocean, which reached Easter Island around the 5th century.	Malayo-Polynesian	Polynesian	Rapa Nui	Easter Island
Chonan The Chon languages form a clear phylogenetic group and only recent evidence has been provided to link it to Puelche.	Chon		Selkʼnam (†)	Magallanes
Chonan The Chon languages form a clear phylogenetic group and only recent evidence has been provided to link it to Puelche.	Chon		Tehuelche (†)	Aysén, Magallanes
Chonan The Chon languages form a clear phylogenetic group and only recent evidence has been provided to link it to Puelche.	Puelche		Gününa këna (†)	Los Ríos, Los Lagos
Huarpean Originally from Cuyo, during the 17th century, many Huarpes were deported to Santiago where they became a large community.			Allentiac (†)	Santiago
Huarpean Originally from Cuyo, during the 17th century, many Huarpes were deported to Santiago where they became a large community.			Millcayac (†)	Santiago
Quechuan These languages constitute different families of languages since not all varieties of Quechua are mutually understandable.	Quechua II		Southern Quechua	El Loa
Language isolates Attempts have been made to group these languages into larger families but without success.			Kawésqar	Magallanes
Language isolates Attempts have been made to group these languages into larger families but without success.			Kunza (†?)	Antofagasta
Language isolates Attempts have been made to group these languages into larger families but without success.			Mapudungun	Araucanía, Metropolitan Region of Santiago, Biobío, Los Ríos, Los Lagos
Language isolates Attempts have been made to group these languages into larger families but without success.			Yaghan (†)	Magallanes
Unclassified languages There is also a group of languages very scarcely documented and references to languages of extinct peoples, which have not been classified due to lack of information.			Cacán	Atacama
Unclassified languages There is also a group of languages very scarcely documented and references to languages of extinct peoples, which have not been classified due to lack of information.			Chono (†)	Los Lagos, Aysén

== Non-indigenous languages spoken by distinct communities or immigrants ==
- Arabic: spoken by the Lebanese, Syrian, Palestinian and Turkish communities.
- Croatian: spoken by Croatian immigrant communities, especially in the south of the country.
- English: spoken by immigrants and their descendants.
- German: maintained by the descendants of German immigrants who arrived in the south in the mid-19th century, mainly standard High German (acquired through education), but also vernacular forms such as German dialects from the shores of Lake Llanquihue.
- Haitian Creole: used by the Haitian community
- Italian: spoken by the Italian immigrant community.
- Korean: spoken by the Korean Community.
- Mandarin Chinese: spoken by the Chinese and Taiwanese communities.
- Romani: Spoken by the Romani people.
- Chilean Sign Language: Used by the country's Deaf community.
