= Selknam =

Selknam or Selkʼnam may refer to:

- Selkʼnam people, also known as the Ona, an Indigenous group in South America.
- Selknam (rugby union), a rugby union team in Chile.
- Selkʼnam language, also known as Ona, spoken by Selkʼnam people.
