= Querandí language =

Indigenous South American language

Querandí
- Didiuhet (?)
- Native to: Argentina
- Region: Patagonian pampas
- Ethnicity: Querandí etc.
- Extinct: late 18th century
- Revival: 2020s
- Language family: unclassified ("Het"; Chonan?)

Language codes
- ISO 639-3: None (mis)
- Glottolog: quer1237
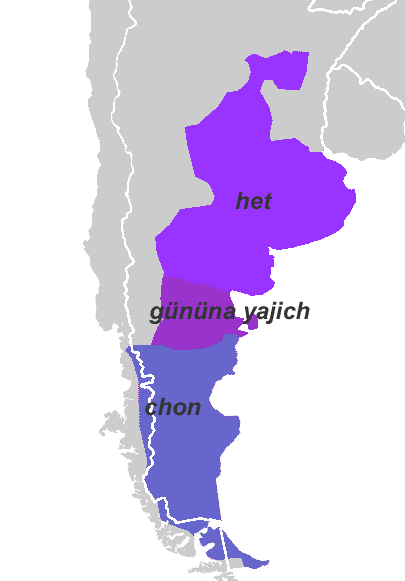
- Approximate distribution of the Het, Puelche, and Chon peoples prior to their genocide

The Querandí language is an Indigenous language of Argentina believed by some to be a member of the Het language family. It is almost entirely unknown, mainly on the basis of a few phrases and words, as well as on the basis of onomastics.

== Classification ==
It has been linked with Gününa Küne and Chon, but the lack of material makes confirming such a connection impossible. In particular, only two sentences and a few words recorded by French sailors around 1555 are known from the Querandí language. This evidence is too scarce to be able to conclusively identify a relationship, although on the basis of this little data, Viegas-Barros shows that the language of the Querandíes could have been related to Gününa Küne. It was said in 1637 that Father Alonzo de Barcena had written a book, titled Arte y Vocabulario de la lengua de los Querandíes, about the Querandí language. No trace of this book has been found so far.

== Revival ==
Based on the limited documentary evidence, the Querandí have begun to revive the use of their language.

== Vocabulary ==
Loukotka (1968) lists the following vocabulary items for Querandi:

gloss	Querandí (Didiuhet)
moon	zobá
bow	afia

Querandi zoba '(likely) moon' may be related to Tehuelche sheewen 'sun' or sheewen-on 'moon'

Some maledictions in Querandí are:

Assaganoup o zoba 'the moon will make you regret it'

Caudy caudy vvuahiph gomálat 'Oh traitor, traitor, you must be killed'
