= Teushen =

Ethnic group

Teushen Tehues
Total population
- extinct

Regions with significant populations
- Argentina

Languages
- Teushen language

Religion
- Traditional tribal religion

Related ethnic groups
- Tehuelche and Puelche people

The Teushen or Tehues were an Indigenous hunter-gatherer people of Patagonia in Argentina. They were considered "foot nomads", whose culture relied on hunting and gathering. Their territory was between the Tehuelche people to the south and the Puelche people to their north.

Before 1850, estimates claimed that there were 500 to 600 Teushen people. They were slaughtered in the Argentinian genocides of Patagonia, known as the Conquest of the Desert. By 1925, only ten to twelve Teushen survived. They are considered extinct as a tribe.

The Teushen language is almost entirely unknown. Linguists believe, from the limited data available, that it was closest to Tehuelche, the language of the people to the south of the Teushen.

== See also ==
- Haush
- Selkʼnam
- Tehuelche
