= Liolaemus casamiquelai =

Conservation status
- Least Concern (IUCN 3.1)

Scientific classification
- Kingdom: Animalia
- Phylum: Chordata
- Class: Reptilia
- Order: Squamata
- Suborder: Iguania
- Family: Liolaemidae
- Genus: Liolaemus
- Species: L. casamiquelai

Binomial name
- Liolaemus casamiquelai Avila, Perez, Morando & Sites, 2010

Species of lizard

Liolaemus casamiquelai is a species of lizard in the family Liolaemidae. The species is endemic to Argentina.

== Etymology ==
The specific name, casamiquelai, is in honor of Argentine paleontologist Rodolfo Magín Casamiquela.

== Geographic range ==
L. casamiqeulai is found in Río Negro Province, Argentina.

== Habitat ==
The preferred natural habitat of L. casamiquelai is desert, at altitudes of 834–876 m (2,736–2,874 ft).
