= Haush language =

Extinct Chonan language of Argentina

Haush
- Manekʼenk
- Native to: Argentina
- Region: Mitre Peninsula
- Ethnicity: Haush people
- Extinct: c. 1920
- Language family: Chonan: Chon proper; Haush

Language codes
- ISO 639-3: None (mis)
- Glottolog: haus1240
- Haush

The Haush language (also Manekʼenk) was an indigenous language spoken by the Haush people and was formerly spoken on the island of Tierra del Fuego. The Haush were considered the oldest inhabitants of Tierra del Fuego; at the time of first European contact, they inhabited the far eastern tip of the Mitre Peninsula.

Before 1850, an estimated 300 people spoke Haush. The last speaker of Haush died around 1920 and the language is considered extinct.

Haush is considered to be related to the Selkʼnam, Gününa Yajich, Teushen, and Tehuelche languages, which collectively belong to the Chonan language family.

== Vocabulary ==
Carlo Luigi Spegazzini (1899) cites the following Haush vocabulary.

=== Words ===
Haush	English
ča(a)wataʔ	small mushroom
se	wife
maʔčaju-	young man
kotek	to whistle
k’ero	small hawk
t’elk’en	child

=== Phrases ===
anan k-as-pe-nk naʔ
canoe AN-inside-be(.sitting)-CER.M DEI1
'He is in the canoe.'

hajketa(s) sola-n(k)
3 be.strong-CER.M
'He is strong.'

asi n a-ma: čeʔne-s
INTERR ? DISP-DEI3 come-DUB
'Who's coming?'

a-ma(a) henk čeʔne-s
DISP-DEI3 man come-DUB
'A man comes.'

naʔ pe-j ma(a) n
DEI1 be(.sitting)-IMP 2 ?
'Sit here.'

ma(a) (a)jam-i so:l
2 light-IMP fire
'You, light the fire.'

{asa ma(a)} k-ameč’-i k’om-nk
why AN-grab-INF AUX.NEG-CER.M
'Why won't you grab?'

kar k-ʔaj-Ø o(n) a(a) t’a-Ø
something AN-give-IMP INFR for eat-INF
'Give me something to eat.'

== See also ==
- Yaghan language
- Selkʼnam language
- Kawésqar language
