= Teushen language =

Language spoken in Patagonia

Teushen
- Tehues (Teuéx)
- Native to: Argentina
- Region: Chubut
- Ethnicity: Tehues
- Extinct: 1970s
- Language family: Chonan?: Chon proper; Continental Chon; Teushen

Language codes
- ISO 639-3: None (mis)
- Glottolog: teus1236
- ELP: Teushen

The Teushen language was an indigenous language of Argentina, possibly now extinct. It was spoken by the Teushen people, a nomadic hunter-gatherer people of Patagonia, who lived between the Puelche people to their north and the Tehuelche people to the south, occupying the central part of the Chubut region; they are now extinct.

The language is related to the Selkʼnam, Gününa Yajüch, and Tehuelche languages. These collectively belong to the Chonan language family.

In the early 19th century, some Tehuelche people also spoke Teushen.

== See also ==
- Haush language
- Kawésqar language
- Selkʼnam language
- Tehuelche language
- Yaghan language
