= Mitre Peninsula =

Eastern point of Tierra del Fuego

Coordinates: 54°46′S 65°46′W

Designations

Ramsar Wetland
- Official name: Península Mitre
- Designated: 20 August 2024
- Reference no.: 2557

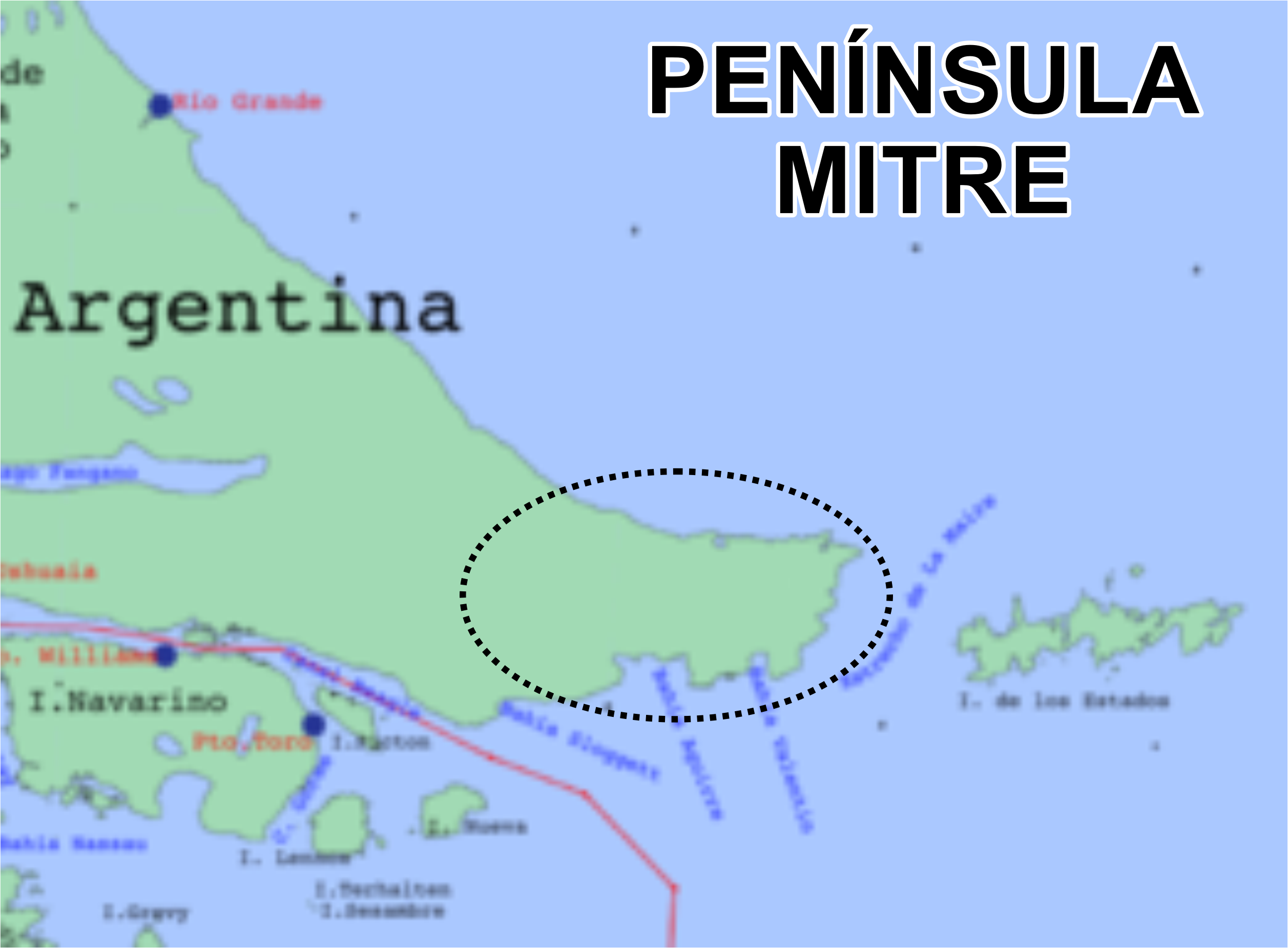

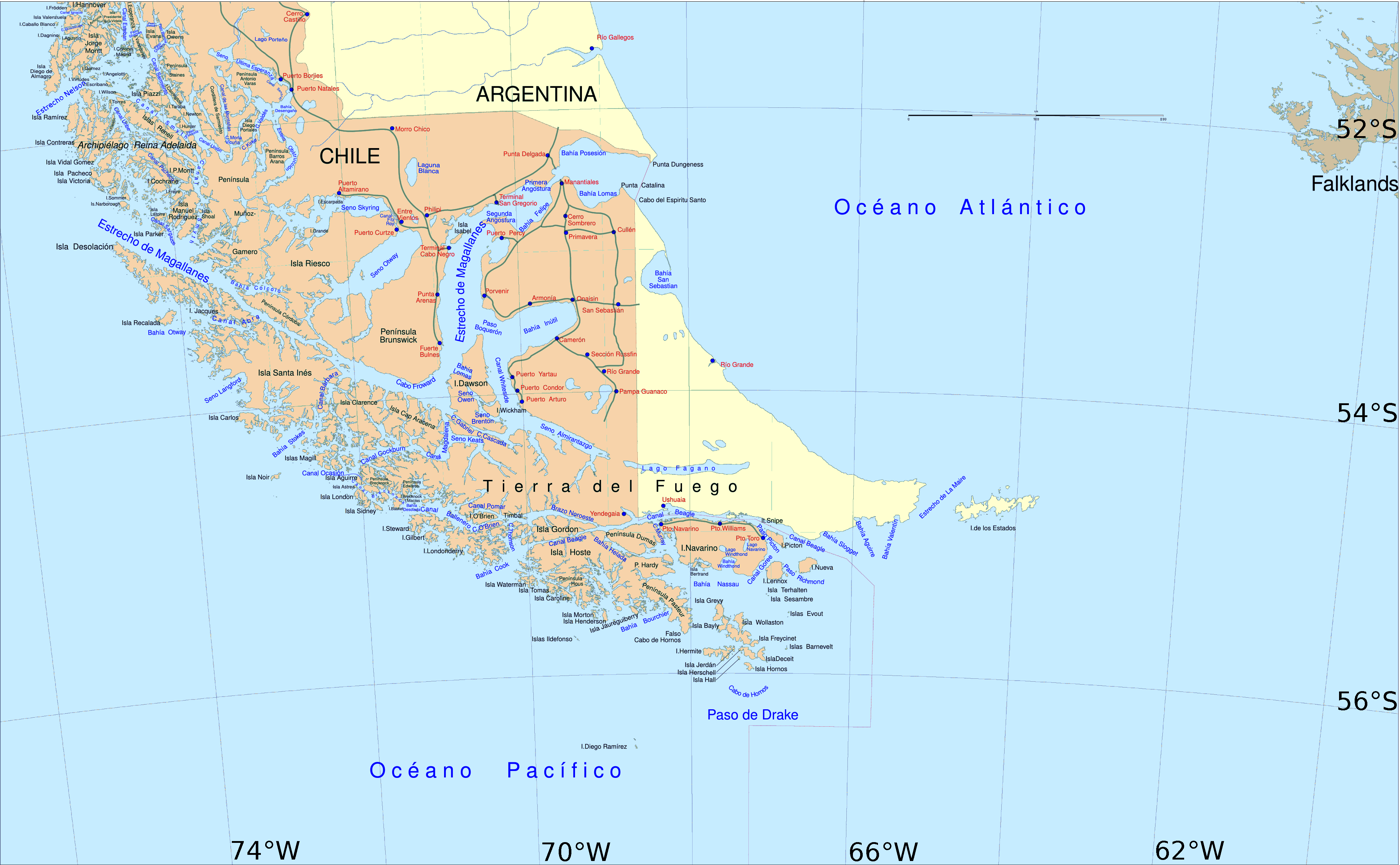

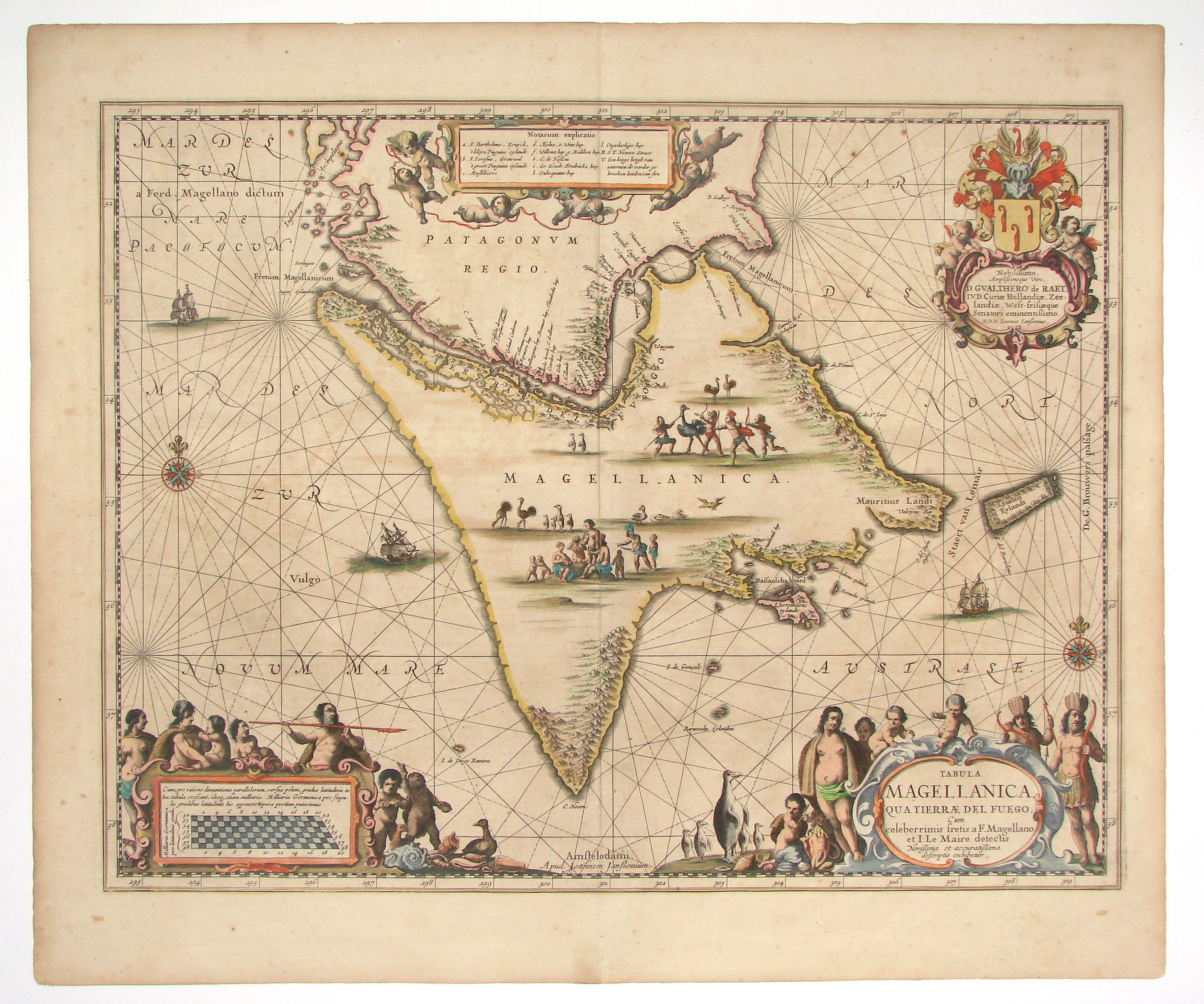
Mauritius Landt on Dutch map of 1657

Mitre Peninsula is the easternmost part of Isla Grande de Tierra del Fuego, located in the very southeast of the island, with its easternmost point, Cabo San Diego, 29 km northwest of Isla de los Estados, from which it is separated by Le Maire Strait. In the south, the peninsula is bounded by the Beagle Channel, and in the north by the Argentine Sea. It is under 4000 km^{2} in area. The highest peak is Cerro Campana in the southern Montes Negros range with 1026 meters. Monte Atocha is nearby the southwest.

The peninsula was named by explorer Julio Popper to honor Bartolomé Mitre.

The area is part of Ushuaia municipality and the department of Tierra del Fuego Province (Argentina). The only settlements (all estancias) are Estancia Policarpo on the north coast (on Policarpo River), Estancia Bahía Aguirre (southwest coast), Estancia Bahía Sloggett (further west), and Estancia Puerto Rancho (close to the southernmost point of the island, Cabo San Pio).

A former settlement is Bahía Thetis, on the namesake bay five kilometers west of Cabo San Diego. There is a lighthouse at Cabo San Diego (Cabo San Diego Light), established in 1934, and another one at Cabo San Pio (Cabo San Pio Light), established in 1919. Both are still in operation.

In the south of the peninsula are the southernmost caves of the world. The peninsula was designated as a protected Ramsar site in 2025.

Formerly, the area was inhabited by the indigenous Haush and Selkʼnam.

Two roads approach the peninsula from the west, but only the northern one enters it: Road 24CA, from the northwest, running along the north coast until Estancia Maria Luisa, followed by a trail until Estancia Policarpo, and Road 24CJ, along the south coast until Estancia Harberton. Both roads are branching east from National Route 3, which runs north–south west of the peninsula. Road 24CJ is the direction of Ushuaia, and 24CA of Río Grande.
