= Het peoples =

Indigenous people of the northern Patagonian pampas west of the Paraná River

Het is the term used by Thomas Falkner, an English Jesuit, at the end of the 18th century for various nomadic groups from the Argentine Pampas and Patagonia, including the so-called Indigenous Pampas and northern Tehuelches, but excluding the Mapuche (speakers of Mapudungun).

Falkner subdivided the Het into the Chechehet, the Diuihet or Didiuhet, and the Taluhet. The easternmost Didiuhet, near modern Buenos Aires and influenced by the Guarani, were called the Querandí. It is not clear if these peoples were related linguistically or only culturally.

The Het were neighbored on the north by the Chaná, on the northwest and west by the Mapuche, and on the south by the Puelche.

== Peoples ==
Faulkner in the middle-to-late 1700s had listed few ethnic groups in the northeastern pampas region that were not Araucanian:

- The Taluhet occupied the modern provinces of San Luis in the east, Córdoba, and Santa Fe in the west.
- The Diuihet (Divihet, Didiuhet, Diliuhet) inhabited the coastal region between the La Plata and Paraná rivers in Buenos Aires Province, southern Santa Fe, and inland through La Pampa and as far as Mendoza. The easternmost Diuihet were the Querandí.
- The Chechehet lived as far south as the mouths of the Colorado and Río Negro rivers in southern Buenos Aires Province.
- The Tehuelhet are now known as the Tehuelche people.

== Language ==
Het
- (=Gününa Küne)
- (disputed)
- Geographic distribution: Argentina
- Linguistic classification: Macro-Panoan ?: Mosetén–Chonan ?; Chon ?; Gününa Küne–Het ?; Het
- Subdivisions: Chechehet †; Querandí †; ?Taluhet † (unattested)

Language codes
- Glottolog: None
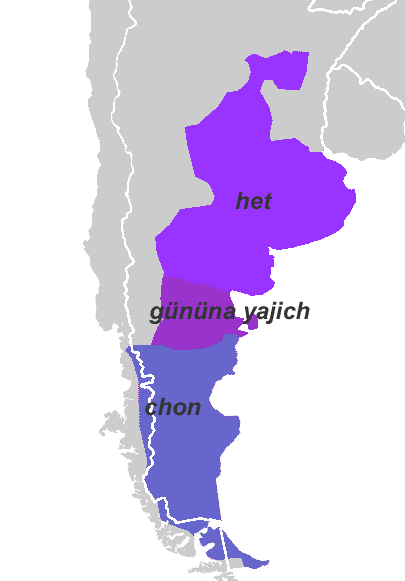
- Het

- Approximate distribution of languages in the southern tip of South America at the time of the Conquest.

In 1922, Robert Lehmann-Nitsche noted the common "het" in the demonyms and proposed the "Het" language family with multiple members, including Chechehet, Querandí, and Taluhet, although later reduced the family himself to just Chechehet. This idea was later picked up by Loukotka and Mason, but strongly opposed by Antonio Tovar and José Pedro Viegas-Barros. Modern researchers consider the Chechehet language to be another name for Gününa Küne. In accordance with this theory, Glottolog combines linguistic materials for Chechehet with Puelche.

Viegas-Barros, based on the work of Rodolfo Casamiquela, states that the Het languages are in fact "ghost languages" that never existed, the language name arising from problems of interpretation.

The supposed linguistic similarities between languages of different tribes, grouped by Falkner together as "Hets", are highly disputable.

According to Lyle Campbell, the languages are equivalent to Gününa Küne. Campbell (2024) declares Loukotka's findings as stemming from a confusion with a long history".

=== Vocabularies ===
Loukotka (1968) lists the following basic vocabulary items for Chechehet and Querandí; Taluhet is unattested.

gloss	Chechehet	Querandí (Didiuhet)
two	chivil	
moon		zobá
earth	chu	
bow		afia
great	hati	

== Sources ==
- Campbell, L. (2024). "Phantom, False, and Spurious Languages of South America". The Indigenous Languages of the Americas: History and Classification. Oxford University Press. ISBN 978-0-19-767346-1.
