= Catalan language in Argentina =

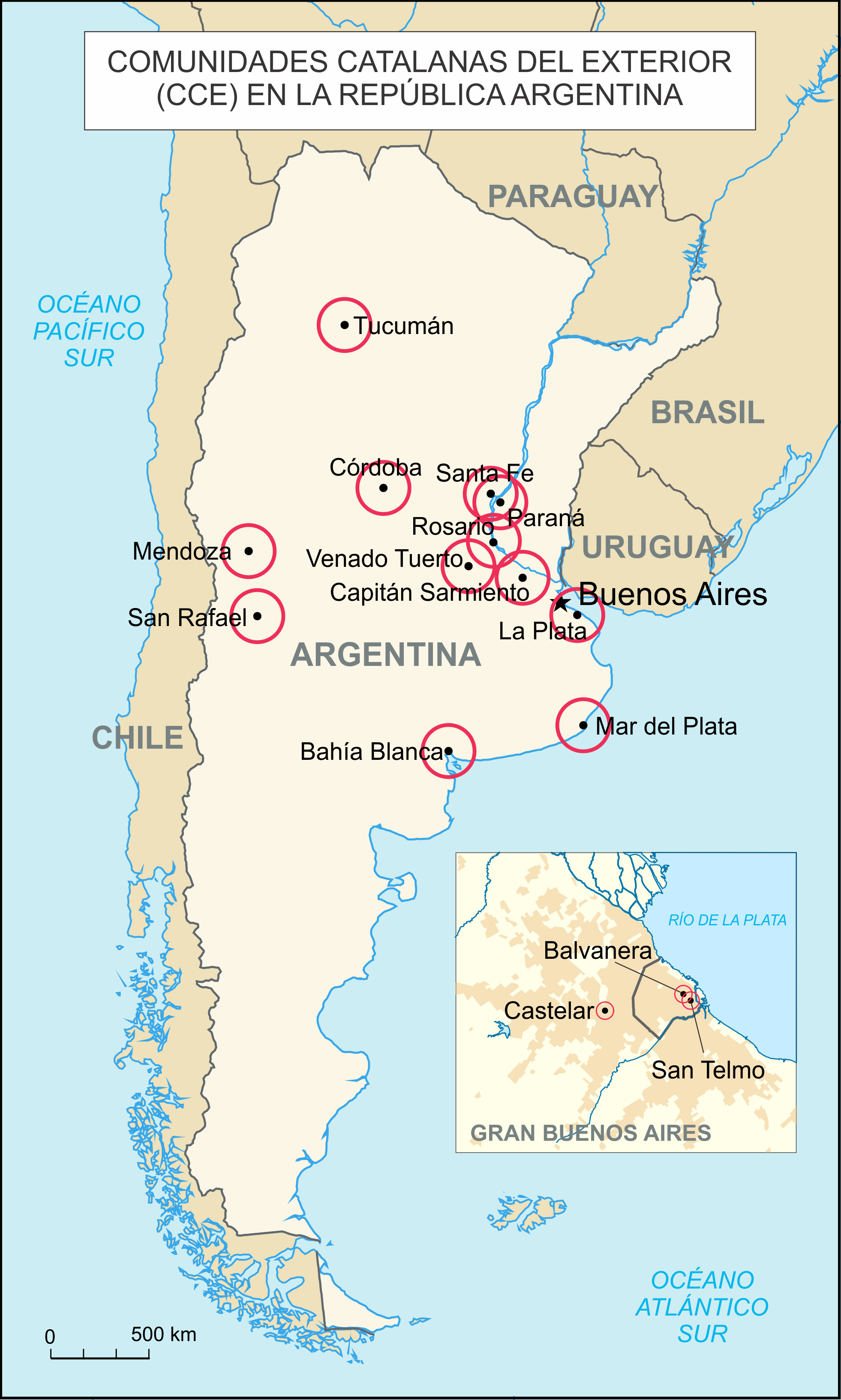
The current Catalan communities of Argentina.

The Catalan language has existed in Argentina at least since the 19th century, when large communities of peninsular Catalans, Valencians and Balearic Islanders began migrating to the South American country. One of the most notable migrations was that of Mallorcans to the city of San Pedro. Today, Argentina is the non-European country with the largest Catalan-speaking community in the world, with around 200,000 speakers, meaning that 0.45% of the Argentine population can speak the language.

== History ==
When in the 18th century the monopoly of trade with the Americas by Seville - Cádiz began to end, Catalans, Mallorcan and Valencian sailors and merchants could now go to the Americas without registering. The first emigration was not important. Between 1765 and 1820, Catalan emigrants to Argentina were only 1,200. However, there were two Argentine presidents (of the government and parliament) born in Catalonia: Juan Larrea and Domingo Matheu.

Years later, Catalans emigrated to Argentina again. In 1857, the first Catalan mutual group was created in Buenos Aires, the Montepío de Montserrat. Today, it is still the main institution of the Catalan community in Argentina. The Montepío fulfilled a social function of great importance, to which must be added the contribution to the maintenance of Catalan culture. The neighborhood where it is located, Montserrat, also takes its name from the Virgin of Montserrat.

At the beginning of the 20th century, the colonization of Argentine lands by Valencians took place , a venture promoted by the writer Vicente Blasco Ibáñez. Two towns were created, Cervantes , in the Río Negro Province and Nueva Valencia, in the Corrientes Province. There was also a Valencian colony in San Juan, which has maintained the language and other traditions such as fallas or pilota.

In addition, the arrival of Mallorcans began to become common. The emigration from Manacor to Argentina had two main causes: demography and economy. The population of the city had a rapid growth, which would cause an increase in the demand for housing. With the emigration, Manacor became the town that had the most emigrants in the entire island of Mallorca, with a rate of -42%.

Immigration to Argentina was so strong that even the city of Goyena was founded by Mallorcans from Son Servera on April 2, 1902. Since its foundation, the population of Goyena has been made up of Mallorcans. The city of San Pedro also received many Mallorcan immigrants, so much so that in the first half of the 20th century they made up 25% of the city's population.

The immigrants continued to speak Catalan in San Pedro, which produced the first linguistic variation of the Catalan language in Argentine lands with the second generation. The Mallorcan gastronomic influence in San Pedro has also been very important. The ensaïmada has become a typical product of San Pedro, so much so that the city has been declared the National Capital of the Ensaimada Argentina. Currently it has different communities, one of the most present being the Mallorcan. Hence the city has adopted this tradition as its own.

== Influence on local culture ==
The continued Catalan presence in Argentina has left several cultural and linguistic traces, often shared with Uruguay and Chile. One of the most obvious is the so-called pito catalán, which is what they call in Argentina the well-known gesture of making a clap and a whistle. Another characteristic Argentine feature, the interjection che (so common that it is even used to refer to Argentines in general), could also have Catalan origins, in this case the xe typical of the Valencia region. It is not clear that this is so, since it could also come from the Italian cè or from a Guarani word, with the proposal of a Valencian origin being the most accepted proposal. Another Valencian (or Mallorcan) trace in Argentina and Uruguay is the game of truc, called there truco.

In addition, the Spanish of Argentina has numerous words that could be of Catalan origin. Once again, there is no scientific certainty, since in some cases Old Spanish had similar words, but it has often been postulated that some of the following words could come directly from Catalan: frazada (flassada, blanket), retar (reptar, challenge) (in the sense of scolding), trompada (in Argentina, a punch), cremar íd., garrón (garrón) (in the sense of a bone of a bovine animal with little meat, which has given rise to the Spanish expression comerse un marrón, initially garrón).

As a curiosity, the adjective atorrante, very common in the country, defines someone lazy, shameless or careless. There are several popular etymologies, one of which explains that, at the end of the 19th century, vagrants and unemployed people in the vicinity of Buenos Aires often took refuge from the inclemency of the weather inside large pipes that were in the works in progress. These pipes were engraved with the name of the manufacturer, A. Torrent (or similar) and from here these citizens of bad living would have taken the nickname.

== Argentine Mallorcan ==
Argentine Mallorcan is a variant of Catalan spoken in San Pedro, Argentina, from the late 19th century and into the 20th century, brought by a colony of people from Manacor and Felanitx. Although not all Mallorcan emigrants to Argentina went to San Pedro, many did. In 2014, some residents still retained the language. However, the language in San Pedro is likely to become extinct after the death of its current speakers.

=== Features ===
Among the phonetic features of Catalan speakers in San Pedro, the most important is the hesitant aspiration of the letter s in the final position of a syllable or word, in the same way as the Spanish of the Riu Platen. For example: “tu et donaràh conte que se mescla molt”, “Tomeu, vols menjà ventrehca de middia?”, “a ca nohtra”, “eh veïnats toth eren cahtellans”, “noltros dos, anàvem a ehcola”.

Many loans from Rioplatense Spanish are also used , which have been classified as established (used by the entire Catalan-speaking community) and momentary (only used occasionally). Some of the most common loans in Mallorcan from Argentina are: alquilar (to rent), assat (grilled meat roast), bolsa (bag), camot (sweet potato), carpinter (carpenter), cortar (to cut), cossetxa (harvest), cossetxar (to harvest), criadero (farm), departament (apartment, housing), empezar (begin), entonces (then), estableciment (commercial establishment), fetxa (date), hasta (until), letxon (pig), limpiar (clean), limpiessa (cleaning, cleanliness), mesita (nightstand), mutxatxo (lot), peça (room), poll (chicken), sequia (drought), sobrino (nephew), tomar (take), vez (once) and volta (turn).

== See also ==
- Languages of Argentina
