= Haush =

Indigenous people of Tierra del Fuego

Manek'enk
- Map showing the location of the Haush in the Southern Patagonia

Regions with significant populations
- Argentina

Languages
- Haush

Religion
- Traditional tribal religion

Related ethnic groups
- Selkʼnam, Tehuelche, Teushen

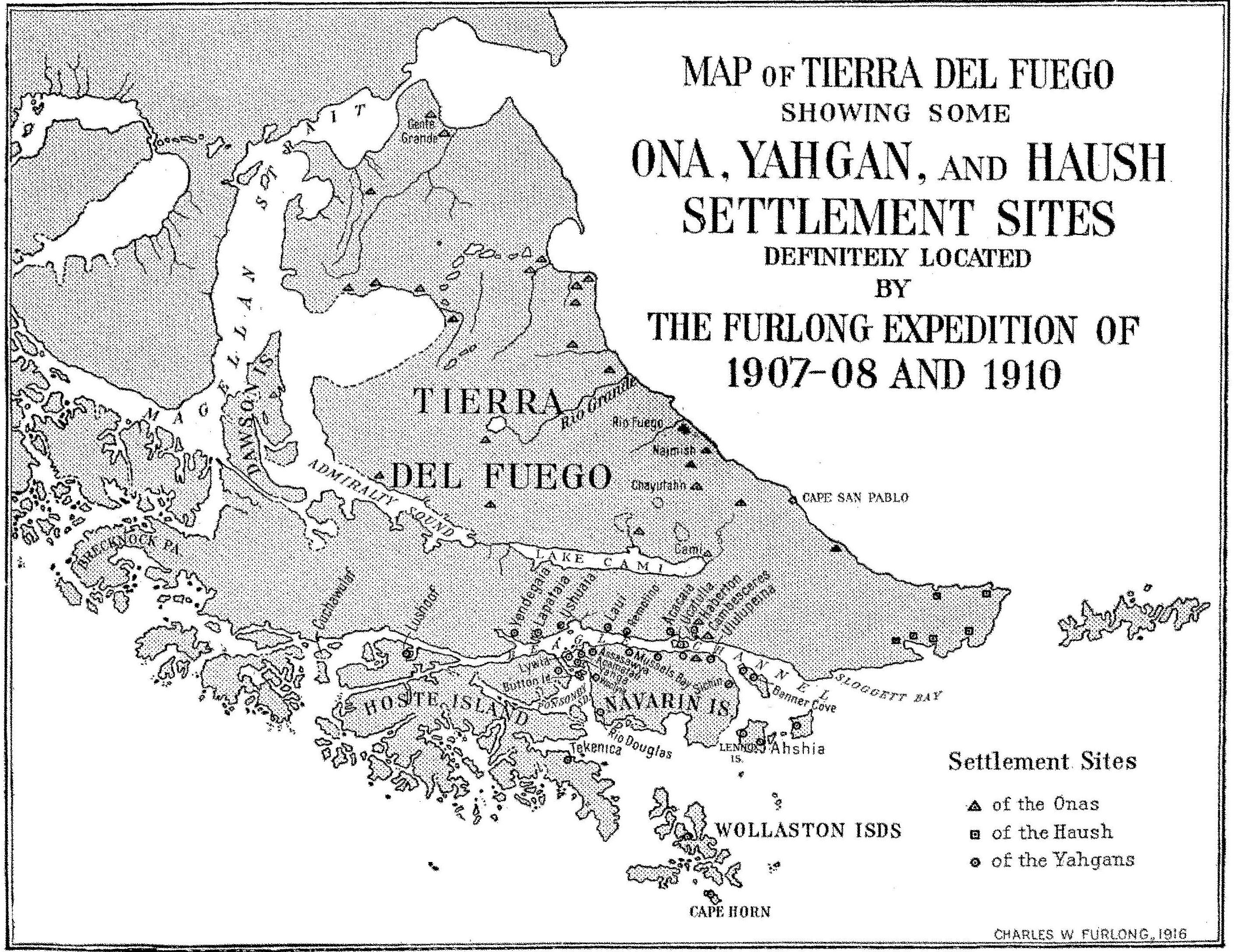
1917 map of Tierra del Fuego showing some Selkʼnam, Yahgan, and Haush settlement sites

The Haush or Manekʼenk people were an Indigenous people who lived on the Mitre Peninsula of the Isla Grande de Tierra del Fuego. They were related culturally and linguistically to the Selkʼnam (also known as Ona) people who also lived on the Isla Grande de Tierra del Fuego, and to the Tehuelche people of southern mainland Patagonia.

== Name ==
Haush was the name given them by the Selkʼnam people, while the Yahgan (also known as Yámana) people called them Italum Ona, meaning Eastern Ona. Several authors state that their name for themselves was Manek'enk or Manek'enkn. Martin Gusinde reported, however, that in the Haush language Manek'enkn simply meant people in general. Furlong notes that Haush has no meaning in the Selkʼnam language, while haush means kelp in the Yahgan language. Since the Selkʼnam probably met the Yahgan people primarily in Haush territory, Furlong speculates that the Selkʼnam borrowed haush as the name of the people from the Yahgan language.

== Origins ==
Most authors believe that the Haush were the first people to occupy Isla Grande de Tierra del Fuego. The Haush are related to the Selkʼnam and Tehuelche, and the three groups are presumed to have developed from a predecessor group in mainland Patagonia. The three groups were hunters, particularly of guanacos, and do not have any history of using watercraft.

As the Haush and Selkʼnam did not use watercraft, the Straits of Magellan would have been a formidable barrier to reaching the Isla Grande de Tierra del Fuego. (Note: Furlong states that the Haush were not "a canoe people, though there seems to be some evidence that during the quieter season of the year some of them used canoes." Lothrop reported that the Haush "had never used a boat.") The Selkʼnam had a tradition that a land bridge had once connected the island to the mainland, but later collapsed. Lothrop dismissed that as geologically implausible. Furlong suggested that canoe Indians (Yahgan or Kawésqar (Alacalufe) people) carried the Haush and Selkʼnam across the Straits.

== Territory ==
The Haush may have occupied all of the Isla Grande de Tierra del Fuego several thousand years ago, before the Selkʼnam reached the island. Many place names in what was Selkʼnam territory in historical times are identified as Haush. After crossing over from the mainland, the Selkʼnam are presumed to have killed or absorbed most of the Haush, and pushed the remnants into the Mitre Peninsula.

The Haush territory was split into two sub-areas. The northern sub-area, adjacent to Selkʼnam territory, extended along the east coast of the island from Cape San Pablo to Caleta Falsa on Polycarpo Bay. The southern sub-area extended from Caleta Falsa around the eastern end of the Mitre Peninsula to Sloggett Bay. The northern sub-area has more favorable conditions for habitation. The southern sub-area, which is now virtually uninhabited, has harsher conditions, being colder and having more rain, fog and wind than the northern sub-area. Furlong states that the Haush territory was from Cape San Pablo to Good Success Bay, with only an occasional trip as far west as Sloggett Bay, and that their principal settlements were at Cape San Pablo, Polycarpo Cove, False Cove, Thetis Bay, Cape San Diego and Good Success Bay.

The Haush were patrilineal and patrilocal. They were divided into at least ten family units, each possessing a strip of land running from inland hunting grounds to the seashore. Nuclear families (five or six people) would migrate individually through their extended family's territory, occasionally joining up with other nuclear families. Groups from several territories would gather for rites, exchanging gifts, and exploiting stranded whales.

== Culture ==
The Haush were hunter-gatherers. The Haush obtained a large part of their food from marine sources. Analysis of bones from burial sites on Isla Grande de Tierra del Fuego indicate that the pre-European contact Selkʼnam obtained most of the meat they ate from guanacos and other land animals, while the pre-European contact Haush, like the Yahgan, obtained the majority of the meat they ate from marine sources, including seals and sea lions. As guanacos were relatively scarce in Haush territory, they probably traded with the Selkʼnam for guanaco skins.

They shared many customs with their neighbors the Selkʼnam, such as using small bows and stone-tipped arrows, using animal skins (from guanacos, as did the Selkʼnam, but also from seals) for the few items of clothing they used (capes, foot coverings and, for the women, small "figleafs"), and an initiation ritual for male youth. Their languages, part of the Chonan family, were similar, although mutually intelligible "only with difficulty".

== European contact ==
At the time of European encounter and settlement, the Haush inhabited the far eastern tip of the island on Mitre Peninsula. Land to their west, still in the northeast of Tierra del Fuego, was occupied by the Selkʼnam, a related linguistic and cultural group, but distinct.

The first contact between the Haush and Europeans occurred in 1619, when the Garcia de Nodal expedition reached the eastern end of the Mitre Peninsula, in a bay that the expedition named Bahia Buen Suceso (Good Success Bay). There they encountered fifteen Haush men, who helped the Spaniards secure water and wood for their ships. The Spaniards reported seeing fifty huts in the Haush camp, by far the largest gathering of Haush ever reported.

A Jesuit priest on a ship that visited Good Success Bay in 1711 described the Haush as "quite docile". The first expedition led by James Cook encountered the Haush in 1769. Captain Cook wrote that the Haush "are perhaps as miserable a set of people as are this day upon earth." HMS Beagle, with Charles Darwin aboard, visited Tierra del Fuego in 1832. Darwin noted the resemblance of the Haush to the "Patagonians" he had seen earlier in the voyage, and stated they were very different from the "stunted, miserable wretches further westward", apparently referring to the Yahgan.

The Haush population declined after European contact. In 1915, Furlong estimated that about twenty families, or 100 Haush, were left early in the 19th century, but later estimated that 200 to 300 Haush remained in 1836. By 1891, only 100 were estimated to be left, and by 1912, fewer than ten.

Salesian missionaries ministered to the Manek'enk, and produced texts that document their culture and language. Father José María Beauvoir prepared a vocabulary. Lucas Bridges, an Anglo-Argentine born in the region, whose father had been an Anglican missionary in Tierra del Fuego, compiled a dictionary of the Haush language.

== Sources ==
- Chapman, Anne; Hester, Thomas R. (1973). "New data on the archaeology of the Haush, Tierra del Fuego". Journal de la société des américanistes. 62 (1): 185–208. doi:10.3406/jsa.1973.2088.
- Chapman, Anne (1982). Drama and Power in a Hunting Society: The Selkʼnam of Tierra Del Fuego. Cambridge University Press. ISBN 978-0-521-23884-7.
- Chapman, Anne (2010). European Encounters with the Yamana People of Cape Horn, Before and After Darwin. Cambridge University Press. ISBN 978-0-521-51379-1.
- Cooper, John M. (December 1915). "Fuegian and Chonoan Tribal Relations". Proceedings of the Nineteenth International Congress of Americanists: 446–447.
- Darwin, Charles (1913) [1845]. Journal of Researches (The Voyage of H.M.S. Beagle) (2nd ed.). London: John Murray. Chapter X. Tierra del Fuego – via Project Gutenberg.
- Furlong, Charles Wellington (March 1917). "Tribal Distribution and Settlements of the Fuegians, Comprising Nomenclature, Etymology, Philology, and Populations". Geographical Review. 3 (3): 169–187. Bibcode:1917GeoRv...3..169F. doi:10.2307/207659. JSTOR 207659.
- Furlong, Charles Wellington (December 1915). "The Haush And Ona, Primitive Tribes Of Tierra Del Fuego". Proceedings of the Nineteenth International Congress of Americanists.
- Lothrop, Samuel Kirkland (2002) [1928]. The Indians of Tierra del Fuego. Patagonia inedita. Vol. 20 (Reprint ed.). Ushuaia: Zagier & Urruty. ISBN 1-879568-92-6.
- Yesner, David R.; Torres, Maria Jose Figuerero; Guichon, Ricardo A.; Borrero, Luis A. (2003). "Stable isotope analysis of human bone and ethnohistoric subsistence patterns in Tierra del Fuego". Journal of Anthropological Archaeology. 22 (3): 279–291. doi:10.1016/S0278-4165(03)00040-0. hdl:11336/34251.
