= Abipón =

Ethnic group

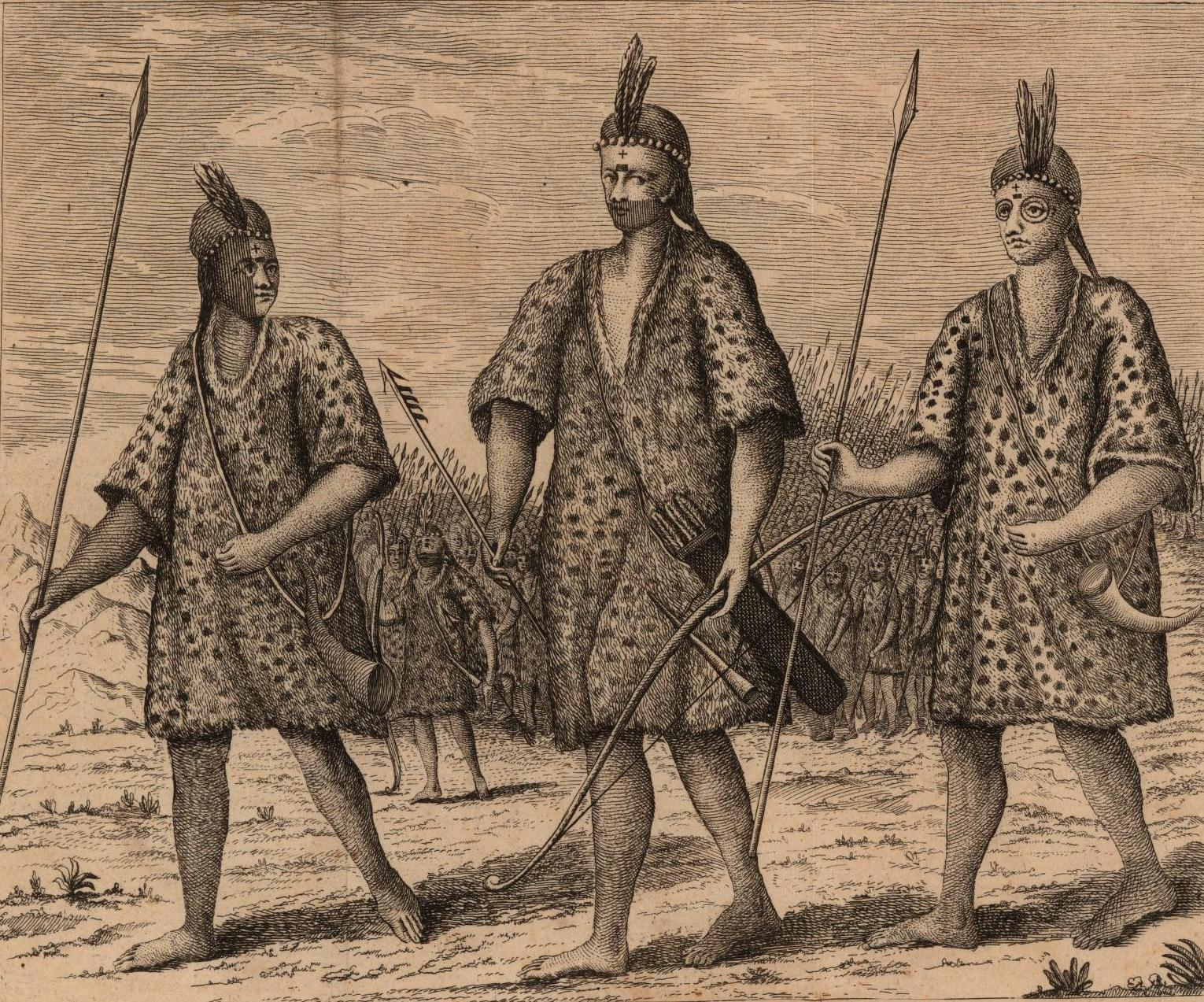
- Abipón warriors

Total population
- 817

Languages
- Mataco–Guaicuru languages, Abipón (Callaga)

Religion
- Animism, Shamanism, Christianity

Related ethnic groups
- Toba, Pilagá, Mocoví, other Guaycurú peoples

The Abipones (Spanish: Abipones, singular Abipón) were an Indigenous people of Argentina's Gran Chaco region and Paraguay, speakers of one of the Guaicuruan languages. They ceased to exist as an independent ethnic group in the early 19th century. A small number of survivors assimilated into Argentine society.

== History ==
The Abipones initially occupied the Gran Chaco of Argentina, in the lower portions of the Bermejo River. They were originally a seasonally mobile people of hunters, gatherers, fishers and to a limited extent farmers.

By 1641, the Abipones had already obtained the horse from the Spanish settlers and abandoned farming for cattle and horse raiding. By that time they still lived north of the Bermejo River They became feared by their neighbours and the Spanish farmers, and even threatened major cities.

It is likely they were driven south of their original range by the Spaniards and other native tribes, such as the Tobas. They were finally concentrated in the Argentinian territory lying between Santa Fe and Santiago del Estero, within the Rio Bermejo on the north and the Salado River on the south.

Before the introduction of the horse in the region, they subsisted by hunting, fishing, food gathering and only a limited amount of agriculture. The addition of the horse caused a change in the regional and in particular the Abipon's way of surviving. They shifted away from agriculture and towards hunting from horseback, wild cattle, rhea, guanaco, deer, and peccary. The horses also lead them to raid the Spanish ranches and even the cities of Asunción and Corrientes.

From 1710, a major military effort by the Spanish began gradually to impose authority on the Abipones. By 1750, Jesuit missions were established among them (mainly by Martin Dobrizhoffer, who had been a missionary in Paraguay for eighteen years), and they had been largely Christianized and turned sedentary. The colonies had incessant trouble with Spanish settlers, and were often raided by the Tobas and the Mocovís, hostile Guaycuru peoples.

By 1768, over half of the Abipones had succumbed to disease and their numbers were below 5,000. The expulsion of the Jesuits by the Spaniards in that year was fatal for the Abipones. When they attempted to resume their former lifestyles, they found their traditional lands occupied by settlers and other Indigenous nations. The Tobas and Mocovís, aided by disease, destroyed them as a nation in the course of less than half a century. The survivors assimilated into the general Argentinian population. They learned to speak Spanish, and abandoned their old customs.

The last speaker of the Abipón language is believed to have died in the 19th century.

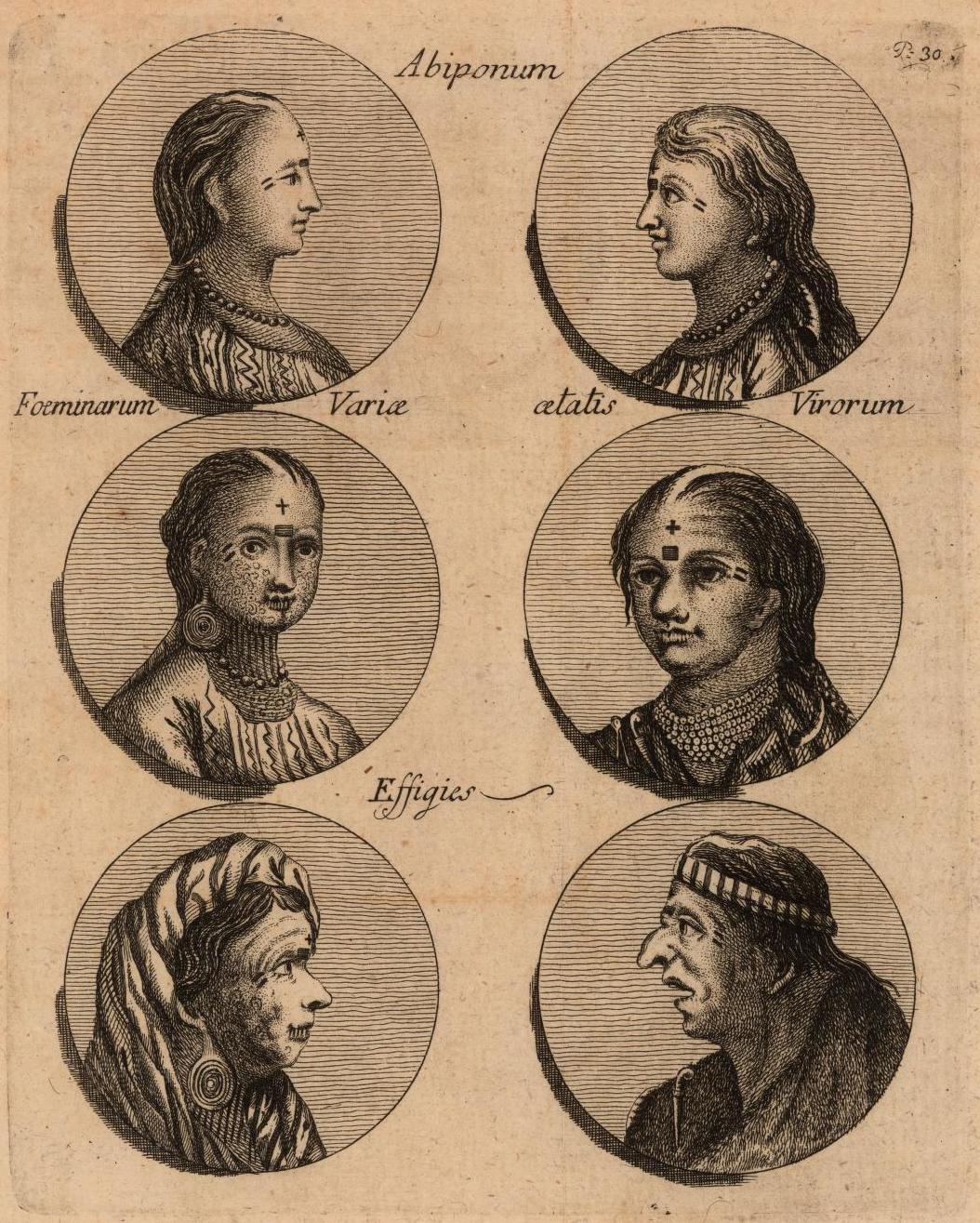
Abipón facial tattooing.

== Appearance and customs ==
According to Martin Dobrizhoffer, who lived among them for seven years, the Abipones were a group of tall, well-formed, handsome people, with black eyes, aquiline noses and thick black hair, which they plucked out from the forehead to the crown as a tribal mark. The faces, breasts and arms of the women were tattooed with black figures of various designs according to their age and social status, and the lips and ears of both genders were pierced.

The men were brave fighters, their main weapons being the bow and arrow, the spear and the club. These weapons were carved out of a local hardwood tree known to them as netergé–, as well as the boleadoras. In battle, they wore an armour fashioned out of a tapir's hide, over which a jaguar's skin was sewn. Even Abipón women were reputedly aggressive and held considerable power in their people's religious rites.

The Abipones were good swimmers and horsemen. During the five-month-long flood season, they lived on islands or even in shelters built in the trees.

They shared most customs of the Guaycurú, including the couvade. They rarely married before the age of 30, and were singularly chaste. Charles Darwin reported that "With the Abipones when a man chooses a wife, he bargains with the parents about the price. But it frequently happens that the girl rescinds what has been agreed upon between the parents and bridegroom, obstinately rejecting the very mention of marriage. She often runs away and hides herself, and thus eludes the bridegroom." Infanticide was common, never more than two children being reared in one family. The young were suckled for two years.
