= Cape San Pío =

Southernmost point in Argentina

Cape San Pío lighthouse
- Location: Cape San Pío; Argentina

Tower
- Constructed: March 10, 1919
- Construction: brick tower
- Height: 8 metres (26 ft)
- Shape: conical (bowling pin)
- Markings: orange and red stripes (or red and white stripes)
- Operator: Argentine Naval Hydrographic Service

Light
- Focal height: 180 feet (55 m)
- Range: 9.2 miles (14.8 km)
- Characteristic: Gp Fl.(2) W 16s

Cape San Pío (Spanish: Cabo San Pio) at 55°3′S 66°31′W, the southernmost tip of mainland Isla Grande de Tierra del Fuego as well as of Argentina, except for the small islet Islote Blanco (55°3′48″S 66°33′12″W) that lies about 1.5 kilometres (0.93 mi) off the coast in SW direction (about 0.5 kilometres (0.31 mi) further to the south).

The cape marks the eastern entrance to the Beagle Channel and has an 8 metres (26 ft) high light Faro Cabo San Pío that dates back to 1919. The brick tower with orange and red bands (or red and white stripes), and an exterior ladder, is shaped like a bowling pin. The characteristic is two white flashes every 16 seconds and the range is 9.2 miles (14.8 km).

== See also ==
- The Moat channel
