= Argentine Sign Language =

Deaf sign language of Argentina

- Native to: Argentina
- Signers: 60,000 (2017)
- Language family: unclassified

Language codes
- ISO 639-3: aed
- Glottolog: arge1236
- ELP: Argentine Sign Language

Argentine Sign Language (Spanish: Lengua de señas argentina, LSA) is used in Argentina. Deaf people attend separate schools, and use local sign languages out of class. A manual alphabet for spelling Spanish has been developed.

== Name and legal recognition ==
The name Lengua de señas argentina was first used in 1985 by Spanish-speaking linguists. Among speakers of LSA, the language shares its name with the verb "to sign" or the fingerspelled "LSA" or "LS" is used.

Argentine Sign Language (LSA) was officially recognized by the government of Argentina in 2023. it had been previously recognized as a natural language of the Deaf communities in Cordoba, La Plata, and Mendoza.

== History ==
LSA is thought to have emerged beginning in 1905, when the boys-only Ayrolo Institute, the first boarding school for the Deaf, was opened in Argentina. However, the school adhered to oralism, and thus LSA was not encouraged. This attitude continued into the 1930s, and with the opening of a boarding school for Deaf girls. However, the 20th century also saw the formation of a number of Deaf associations, providing environments where LSA could be used regularly, for those who opposed the oralism approach.

It was not until the 1990s that proponents of LSA as the primary language of the Argentine Deaf community gained institutional power in the country's Deaf associations.

== Linguistic variation ==
LSA is largely standard across the country, but more pronounced lexical and phonetic variations have been found in Northeast Argentina (Formosa and Chaco), and have been attributed to poorer socioeconomic conditions in the region leading to less travel by Deaf residents, and thus more linguistic isolation.

Researchers have also noticed variations between women and men's LSA, as Argentine schools for the Deaf were sex segregated until 1990. These variations include different signs for colors, days of the week, and numbers. Among younger signers of LSA, the number system originating from the male school is more predominant.

== Phonetics ==
LSA phonemes fall into the categories of Movement (M), Hold (H), and Transition (T). Most signs follow the pattern T-M-H, unless they make contact with the body. Researchers have identified four contour Movement patterns and five local Movement patterns.

Researchers have described sixteen handshape patterns, each with its own variations depending on finger use, thumb position, and extension. Signs may use one or both hands.

== Manual alphabet ==
In Argentine Sign Language (LSA), fingerspelling of the manual alphabet is used to spell out words and convey specific letters of the alphabet manually through handshapes. This system allows Deaf individuals to represent words, names, or concepts for which there are no standard signs, or to clarify spelling in situations where precision is paramount. Manual alphabet handshapes are also integrated into some signs.

LSA's manual alphabet uses either one or two hands, and some signs are located on the body, an unusual characteristics among manual alphabets. Researchers have described similarities between the LSA alphabet and an older version of the Italian manual alphabet.

The manual alphabet in LSA consists of a set of handshapes representing each letter of the Spanish alphabet. Each handshape corresponds to a specific letter, and the fingerspelling process involves sequentially forming these handshapes to spell out the desired word or message. The clarity and accuracy of fingerspelling in LSA rely heavily on precise hand movements, finger positions, and facial expressions to ensure effective communication.

Fingerspelling is commonly used in situations where direct translation from Spanish to LSA is not feasible, such as proper nouns, technical terms, or newly introduced concepts. Additionally, fingerspelling may be employed for emphasis, clarification, or to reinforce understanding within a conversation or educational context.

Proficiency in fingerspelling is an essential skill for both Deaf individuals and those interacting with the Deaf community, as it enhances communication flexibility and comprehension in diverse linguistic settings. Training in fingerspelling is often incorporated into LSA educational programs and language-learning initiatives to promote linguistic proficiency and fluency among users of LSA.

== Lexicon ==
LSA's lexicon contains nouns, verbs, determiners, pronouns, adverbs, conjunctions, prepositions, and interjections. Researchers have suggested that LSA signs do not intrinsically belong to one of these categories, but rather have categories assigned based on their use in context.

Unlike Spanish, LSA nouns do not automatically inflect for gender. In situations where gender is being distinguished, the signs "male" and "female" are usually used within a larger phrase. To designate the gender of kinship terms, the handshape corresponding to "o" or "a' (the Spanish masculine and feminine endings respectively) are used, along with mouthing.

LSA has several ways to indicate a plural noun, including repetition or signing the same sign with both hands.

LSA has six pronouns, corresponding to first, second, and third person, and their plurals. Plural pronouns can use different numbers of fingers to indicate number; for example, two fingers to indicate "the two of us", three for "the three of us", and four for "all of us".

== Grammar ==
LSA uses subject-verb sentence order with intransitive verbs, and subject-object-verb order used with transitive verbs. However, these orders may vary "according to various linguistic constraints and pragmatic purposes.".
