= Gününa Küne language =

Extinct Chonan language

Gününa Küne
- Gennaken, Puelche, Tehuelche
- Günün a yajüch
- Pronunciation: [gɨnɨn a jaxətʃ]
- Native to: Argentina
- Region: Río Negro and southern Neuquén
- Ethnicity: Puelches
- Extinct: 1960, with the death of José María Cual
- Language family: Chonan ?: Gününa Küne
- Dialects: ?Chechehet

Language codes
- ISO 639-3: pue
- Glottolog: puel1244
- ELP: Gününa-Küne
- Map of the Gününa Küne language.

- Gününa Küne is classified as Extinct by the UNESCO Atlas of the World's Languages in Danger.

pwel "east"
- People: Gününa künä (Puelche)
- Language: Gününa yajüch
- Country: Günün a atük

Gününa Küne (Puelche) is an extinct Chonan language formerly spoken by the Gününa Küne people in the Pampas region of Argentina. The language is also known as Gennaken (Guenaken), Northern Tehuelche, Gününa Yajüch, Ranquelche, Septentrional Austral Tehuelche and Pampa. It was also spoken by the Chechehet.

== Classification ==
Gününa Küne has long been considered a language isolate. Based on very limited evidence, Viegas Barros (1992) suggested that Gününa Küne might be closely related to the poorly known Querandí language, spoken by the Querandí, one of the Het peoples, and Viegas Barros (2005) posited that it is related to the Chon languages.

== Documentation ==
In 1829, D'Orbigny toured the area of southern Buenos Aires and the mouth of the Río Negro. There he collected words of the "Puelches', "Aucas' and "Tehuelches' —that is, in Günün a Iajüch, Mapuzungun and Teushen, respectively—in the vicinity of Carmen de Patagones, in a permanent settlement of linguistically heterogeneous groups.

The French traveler, intrigued by the indigenous languages of the area, arrived at the tolderías and contacted some interpreters:

"In a tent of friendly Patagonians I found a woman named Lunareja who spoke enough Spanish as if to serve as an interpreter; belonged to the Puelche nation and was married to a Patagonian, so that I knew both languages equally, which was of the greatest use to me. I also knew Araucanian, but the notions of this language could be better transmitted to me by the Indians."

In L'Homme américain (de l'Amérique méridionale) he includes some comments on which highlights pronunciation features, the use of the morpheme ya- prefixed to the parts of the body, the numbering system or the absence of gender markings on adjectives, as well as a list of words that compares with those of other languages of South America.

=== Studies of Gününa yajüch ===
In 1864, Hunziker recorded a vocabulary and a collection of phrases from a language called Genakenn in the Viedma region. In 1865, the explorer Jorge Claraz traveled from south of Buenos Aires to Chubut being guided by individuals who spoke Gününa iajëch, collecting the names of places, words and sentences in his Diario de viaje de exploración al Chubut (Chubut exploration travel diary) (1865–1866).

In 1913, Lehmann Nitsche used the data collected by Hunziker and Claraz to create a comparative vocabulary of Tehuelche languages: El grupo lingüístico tschon de los territorios magallánicos (The Chonan Linguistic Groups of the Magellanic Territories).

In 1925, Harrington gathered words from bilingual Tehuelche speakers which he published in 1946 in Contribución al estudio del indio gününa küne (A Contribution to the Study of the Gününa küne Indian), claiming that they called their language Gününa yájitch or Pampa. During the 1950s, Casamiquela collected vocabulary, songs and prayers from various elders, outlining a morphosyntactic analysis.

In 1960, Ana Gerzenstein made a phonetic and phonological classification in her Fonología de la lengua gününa-këna (Phonology of the Gününa-këna Language).

In 1991, José Pedro Viegas Barros outlined a morphosyntactic projection in Clarificación lingüística de las relaciones interculturales e interétnicas en la región pampeano-patagónica (Linguistic Clarification of Intercultural and Inter-ethnic Relations in the Pampas-Patagonian Region), and in 2005 he developed a phonological description in Voces en el viento (Voices in the Wind).

Puelche is a dead language. Casamiquela released the first and last name of the last Puelche speaker: José María Cual, who died in 1960 at the age of 90.

== Phonology ==
=== Vowels ===
Gününa Küne has 7 vowels:

	Front	Back	
	Unrounded	Unrounded	Rounded
Close	i	ɯ	u
Close-mid	e	ɤ	o
Open-mid		ʌ	
Open	a		

A short sounding /e/ is realized as [ɛ].

=== Consonants ===
Gününa Küne has 25 consonants:

		Bilabial	Alveolar	Retroflex	Palatal	Velar	Uvular	Glottal
Nasal		m	n					
Plosive	voiceless	p	t			k	q	ʔ
Plosive	ejective	pʼ	tʼ			kʼ	(qʼ)	
Plosive	voiced	b	d			ɡ		
Affricate	voiceless		t͡s	t͡ʂ	t͡ʃ			
Affricate	ejective		t͡sʼ	t͡ʂʼ	t͡ʃʼ			
Fricative			s	ʂ	ʃ	x		h
Lateral	voiceless		ɬ					
Lateral	voiced		l		ʎ			
Rhotic	trill		r					
Rhotic	tap		ɾ					
Semivowel					j	w		

It is not clear if there is a uvular ejective stop [qʼ].

== Bibliography ==
- Casamiquela, Rodolfo M. (1983). Nociones de gramática del gününa küne. Paris: French National Centre for Scientific Research.
- Adelaar, Willem (2004). The Languages of the Andes. Cambridge University Press. ISBN 978-0-521-36275-7.

== See also ==
- Boreal Pehuelche
