= Querandí =

South American people

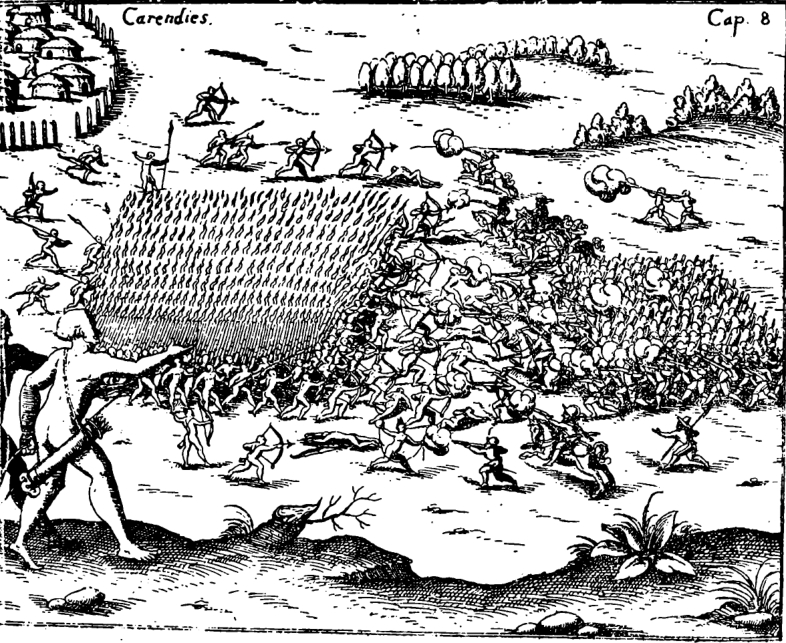
- The Querandí people as depicted by Ulrich Schmidl in the late 16th century.

Total population
- 3,658 (2010)

Languages
- formerly Querandí

Related ethnic groups
- other Het peoples

The Querandí were one of the Het peoples, Indigenous South Americans who lived in the Pampas area of Argentina; specifically, they were the eastern Didiuhet (Diuihet). The name Querandí was given by the Guaraní people, as they would consume animal fat in their daily diet. Thus, Querandí means "men with fat". Prior to the 19th century, they were also known as the Pampas. The Mapuche (or araucanos) called them Puelche.

This is today the present Argentine provinces of La Pampa, most of the province of Buenos Aires, the center and the south of the province of Santa Fe (especially to the south of the Tercero-Carcaraña River), a great part of the province of Cordoba (adapted ecologically to the temperate Pampasia, their northern limits were in the region of the Gran Chaco - around 31° lat. South) and the peneplains of the present provinces of San Luis and Mendoza, although these zones were more difficult to inhabit due to its extreme climate and lack of surface water.

Physically, the Querandí people had a well-proportioned body. They were tall and extremely warlike. They wore leather clothes, similar to a fur blanket; women would also wear a skirt that covered their bodies down to their knees. With a semi sedentary lifestyle, they grouped their leather tents by their water supply in the winter, and they would go on their raids inland in the summer.

At the time of the arrival of the Europeans, they stood out as great runners, hunting, or rather capturing, by running down Pampan deer, ñandúes, and even guanacos, although to facilitate their activity they had invented two devices (one that would become a classic in Argentina): the bolas, and the more primitive one consisting of a stone tied to a cord made with leather or sinews called by the Spaniards a stone-lost boleadora. They would also hunt tinamous, deer, quail and ñandúes with the help of their bows and arrows and their bolas. They also made pottery.

They believed in a great god whom they called Soychu, who had a contender or evil spirit: Gualichu.

According to the 2010 census, there are 3,658 self-identified Querandí in Argentina.

== Relations with the Europeans ==
In 1516, the Spaniard Juan Díaz de Solís landed on the shores of the River Plate (Río de la Plata), but the natives resisted his attempt of conquest and the expedition failed.

Ferdinand Magellan touched the port soon afterwards and went up the River Plate in search for a connection between the Atlantic and Pacific Oceans. When he saw that there was no such connection, he continued navigating southwards along the land presently called Patagonia, making contact with the Tehuelche peoples, whom he called Patagones. After this, he discovered the strait bearing his name and connecting the Atlantic and the Pacific Oceans.

The Querandí tribe first met Europeans when Pedro de Mendoza's expedition arrived in the area of Buenos Aires in 1535. The first foundation of Buenos Aires took place in March 1536 by Mendoza (1487–1537), who had been given the title of "Adelantado" and empowered by Charles V, Holy Roman Emperor “to conquer and colonize the lands in Solis' River, called River Plate". The exact place where the city was founded is not accurately known, as no traces of the foundation act have been found.

The Querandí people, who lived in the surrounding area, were friendly at the beginning and obtained Spanish goods in exchange for food resulting from hunting and fishing; but, suddenly, they chose to interrupt contact and food became scarce among the Spaniards.

With the intention of subjugating the Querandí, Pedro de Mendoza organized a military expedition led by his brother, Diego de Mendoza, which was defeated on the banks of the Luján River on June 15, 1536, in a battle between the Spaniards and the Querandí. The Spanish cavalry was neutralized by the Querandí bolas and the remainder of the force managed to avoid being wiped out and retreated to Buenos Aires in the night. According to Ulrich Schmidl, a soldier in the battle, about forty Spaniards and a thousand people were killed in the fight.

From that moment, Buenos Aires was at the mercy of hunger and the sporadic Querandí raids. The surviving people allied with one another to besiege and force the abandonment of the recently founded city. With the Spaniards abandoning their livestock, they adopted horse-riding and pursued wild cattle and other game, thus generating a new equestrian lifestyle. They continued being nomads, and they could more easily make contact with other native peoples and successfully made war on the Spanish.

Further attempts at conquest and population settlement in the Pampas by the Spaniards left from three different places: Peru, Chile and Asunción in Paraguay. From Peru, the cities of Santiago del Estero (1553), Tucumán (1565), Córdoba (1573), Salta (1582), Catamarca (1583), La Rioja (1591) and Jujuy (1593) were founded.

From Chile were founded the cities of Mendoza (1561), San Juan (1562) and San Luis (1594). And from Asunción del Paraguay, was founded Santa Fe (1573) and Buenos Aires (1580) and Corrientes (1588). Resistance by mounted warriors prevented the Spanish from settling further to the South. The Spanish conqueror Juan de Garay, who carried out the second foundation of Buenos Aires on June 11, 1580, was killed in 1583 during an ambush by Querandi people on his camp on the banks of the Carcarañá River, near the old site of Sebastian Cabots Sancti Spiritus Fort.

== Sources ==
- Ulrich Schmidl, Viaje al Río de la Plata, 1567.
- Thomas Falkner, Description of Patagonia and the adjoining parts of South America, Pugh, Hereford, 1774.
- Bruce G. Trigger, Wilcomb E. Washburn, Richard E. W. Adams, The Cambridge History of the Native Peoples of the Americas, Vol III South America Part 2. , Cambridge University Press, 2000.
