= Abipón language =

Extinct language of Argentina

Abipón
- Native to: Argentina
- Ethnicity: Abipón people
- Extinct: by late 19th century
- Language family: Guaicuruan: Southern; Abipón
- Dialects: Rrikahé; Nakaigetergehé; Yaaukaniga

Language codes
- ISO 639-3: axb
- Glottolog: abip1241
- Map with approximate distributions of languages in Patagonia at the time of the Spanish conquest. Source: W. Adelaar (2004): The Andean Languages, Cambridge University Press.

Abipón is an extinct Guaicuruan language that was at one time spoken in Argentina by the Abipón people. Its last speaker is thought to have died in the 19th century. The language is also known as Abipone, Callaga and Apibon.

== Phonology ==
=== Consonants ===
	Labial	Dental/ Alveolar	Palatal	Velar	Uvular	Glottal
Nasal	m	n̪	ɲ			
Plosive/Affricate	p	t̪	tʃ	k	q	
Fricative				ɣ	ʁ	h
Liquid	w	r, l	j	w		

=== Vowels ===
	Front	Back/Central
Closed	i	ɨ
Mid	e̞	o̞
Open	a	

== Bibliography ==
Cited in the Catholic Encyclopedia

- Hervas (1785), Origine, Formazione, Mecanismo, ed Armonia degli Idiomi (Cesena)
- Hervas (1787), Vocabulario poliglotto
- Hervas (1787), Saggio practico delle Lingue ...
- Adrian Balbi (1826), Atlas ethnographique du globe (Paris)
- Alcide d'Orbigny (1839), L'Homme americain (Paris)
- Daniel Brinton, The American Race.
- UPSID
