= Chonan languages =

Extinct language family of South America

Chonan
- Patagonian
- Geographic distribution: Patagonia and Pampas
- Extinct: 2019, with the death of Dora Manchado (Tehuelche)
- Linguistic classification: One of the world's primary language families.
- Subdivisions: Chon proper; Gününa Küne-?Querandí

Language codes
- Glottolog: chon1288
- Approximate map of the native peoples of the Southern Cone in 1550.

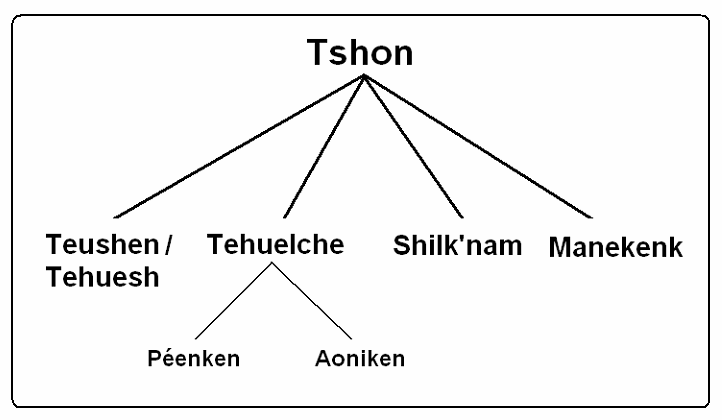
The classification of Chonan languages, according to Roberto Lehmann-Nitsche.

The Chonan languages are an extinct family of indigenous American languages which were spoken in Tierra del Fuego and Patagonia. Two Chonan languages are well attested: Selkʼnam (or Ona), spoken by the people of the same name who occupied territory in the northeast of Tierra del Fuego; and Tehuelche, spoken by the people of the same name who occupied territory north of Tierra del Fuego. The name of the family is from čonn, the Selkʼnam word for 'man'.

== Classification ==
The Haush spoke a language similar to Selkʼnam. Some scholars also add to the family the Teushen language—once spoken by the Teushen, located between the Tehuelche and Puelche—though it is poorly attested.

Viegas Barros (2005) attempts to demonstrate that Gününa Küne to the north is related to the Chon languages and would constitute one branch of an extended Chonan family. This proposal has been picked up by Lyle Campbell. Based on the scanty evidence that is available, the Het peoples (or at least the Didiuhet [Querandí]) might be speakers of languages within the proposed Gününa Küne branch.

If this is correct, the Chon family would be as follows:

- Chonan
  - Tshon
    - Island
      - Selkʼnam (Ona)
      - Haush (Manekʼenk)
    - Continental
      - Tehuelche (Aonikenk)
      - Teushen (Téuesh)
  - Puelche–Het
    - Gününa Küne (Puelche)
    - ? Het
      - Querandí
      - Chechehet

== Vocabulary ==
Loukotka (1968) lists the following basic vocabulary items for the Patagon (Chonan), Gennaken, and Chechehet (Het) languages. Additional words are also provided.

gloss	Patagon (Chonan) languages					Gennaken (Gününa Küne)	Chechehet (Het)	
gloss	Selkʼnam	Mánekenkn	Téuesh	Péeneken	Áoniken	Gennaken (Gününa Küne)	Chechehet	Querandí
one	shórsh	setaul	xáuken	háuke	chochä	chéye		
two	shóki	aim	xaukáya	xoxieg	xánkä	päch	chivil	
ear	shün	shunó	shán	shaʔa	shán	chütsk		
tooth	orx	ánktn	korr	urr	hor	xaye		
hand	chen	shakut	chan	kʔchen	chen	yapal		
foot	yul	halié	kel	kel	kel	yapgit		
sun	kren	anián	sheuen	sheuen	sheuen	apiúkük		
moon	kre	anim	teruch	kenginkon	kängünkon	apioxok		zobá
dog	uéshn	ishna	xelxénoe	shamehuen	xälänuü	dáshü		
earth	harwn		geut, geute		tēm	atek	chu	
bow	hàʔ					yakak		afia
great							hati	
