= Kunza language =

Extinct language of Chile and Peru

Kunza
- Atacameño, Ckunsa
- Likanantaí, Ckunsa
- Native to: Chile, Peru, Bolivia
- Region: Atacama Desert
- Ethnicity: 2,000 Atacama
- Extinct: after 1964?
- Revival: 2020s
- Language family: Language isolate

Language codes
- ISO 639-3: kuz
- Glottolog: kunz1244
- Historic geographical extent of the Kunza language

- Atacameño is classified as Extinct by the UNESCO Atlas of the World's Languages in Danger.

Kunza (Kunza: Likanantaí) is the extinct language isolate of the Atacama people, once spoken in the Atacama Desert of northern Chile and southern Peru who have since shifted to Spanish. The last speakers were documented in 1964; However, there is currently a revitalization effort.

Other names and spellings include Cunza, Ckunsa, Likanantaí, and Atacameño. The word Ckunsa means 'our' in Kunza.

From what data is available, it is believed that it is a polysynthetic language. However, there is not sufficient information to determine which languages it was related to, if any. Thus, it is conventionally classified as a language isolate.

== History ==
The language was spoken in northern Chile, specifically in the Chilean villages of Peine, Socaire (near the Salar de Atacama), and Caspana, and in southern Peru.

The last Kunza speakers were found in 1953 according to anthropologists. Loukotka (1968) reports a few speakers in Bolivia and in the village of Peine in Chile. There are 2,000 Atacameños as of 2004.

A revitalization effort was initiated in the 21st century.

== Classification ==
Kaufman (1990) found a proposed connection between Kunza and the likewise unclassified Kapixaná to be plausible; however, the general consensus among linguists was that both languages are isolates.

== Language contact ==
Jolkesky (2016) notes that there are lexical similarities with the Mochika, Kandoshi, Jaqi, Kechua, Mapudungun, and Uru-Chipaya language families due to contact.

== Phonology ==
=== Consonants ===
The vocabulary of Kunza is well-documented, but the phonetic realizations of lexical transcriptions are not so certain due to the widely differing systems of transcription that were used. Because of this, the accepted phonologic system for Kunza is tentative, and potentially even speculation. Even so, it is well known that the stops and affricates were distinguished between plain and glottalized (the latter being represented by a doubled consonant in some transcriptions, even in initial position).

San Román (1890) makes a considerably greater distinction between different velar and uvular consonants. He distinguishes between ⟨c⟩ and ⟨k⟩, the latter used to represent a "very strong" consonant. His ⟨khˆ⟩ represents a "strong palatal sound", which he found "impossible...to write". Adelaar and Muysken (2004) believe this represents a "strongly aspirated postvelar stop". San Román characterizes Kunza as using many "doubled consonants", pronounced "more separately and strongly than the Italians". He also mentions a sound of a "certain tenderness", which he writes ⟨qc⟩, in contradiction to the perceived "roughness" of the language.

Consonants
		Bilabial	Alveolar		Palatal	Velar	Postvelar	Glottal
		Bilabial	plain	sibilant	Palatal	Velar	Postvelar	Glottal
Nasal		m	n					
Stop/ Affricate	voiceless	p	t	t͡s	t͡ʃ	k	q	ʔ
Stop/ Affricate	ejective	pʼ	tʼ		t͡ʃʼ	(kʼ)	(qʼ)	
Fricative	voiceless		ɬ	s		x	χ	h
Fricative	voiced	β				ɣ		
Approximant		(w)	l		j			
Trill			r					

/w/ is only present in loanwords. /kʼ/ and /qʼ/ are not directly attested, but are presumed to have been present based on data collected in 1981. Velar and postvelar sounds are not consistently distinguished in the data.

=== Vowels ===
The use of doubled vowels in transcriptions suggests the existence of a contrast of length. Very few words begin with a vowel, almost all of them being non-lexical grammatical words or loanwords. The only vowels possible in initial position are /a i/.

Vowels
	Front	Central	Back
Close	i iː		u uː
Mid	e eː	(ə)	o oː
Open		a aː	

== Sample text ==
In 1867, Johann Jakob von Tschudi collected two versions of the prayer Our Father in Kunza.

Version 1
tican cunsa hirico is astansi i cotas cielos.
santi hijia chea vaclo.
cum cachia chema reino lepalo.
as voluntas acquis en la oiri penii cachi li cielo.
hi tancta cumsa he capin vasina canalo aun capin.
i cum perdonácalo cun manuya acquis pen cuna perdonama cun deudorctpas.
i cum deja chacalo cum colac cutia y tentacioniyas.
hichucul cumas librácolo hiri malipanta.
i kis yaclo.

Version 2
Tican tansi cielo stansi santificado chema izcu charcer
chema halu acs koytans levaldise. Señor voluntad tansiacs
koytansi cielo sacuma ctanta acsa viñayapun acsancalo
anjapin acperdona acs deuma chancosinys acperdona acsec-
tunas andejachaculo colcoma en tentación aca librame Señor
hualchas unic. Amen.

== See also ==
- Arackar, a species of dinosaur whose name is derived from Kunza
