= Selkʼnam language =

Chonan language spoken by the Selkʼnam people

Selkʼnam
- Ona
- Selkʼnamčan
- Native to: Argentina, Chile
- Region: Patagonia, Tierra del Fuego.
- Ethnicity: Selkʼnam
- Extinct: after 1981; 1 fluent L2 speaker (2014)
- Revival: currently being revitalised by the modern community
- Language family: Chonan: Chon proper; Island Chon; Selkʼnam
- Writing system: Latin script

Language codes
- ISO 639-3: ona
- Glottolog: onaa1245
- ELP: Ona
- Ona is classified as Extinct by the UNESCO Atlas of the World's Languages in Danger.

- People: Selkʼnam
- Language: Selkʼnamčan
- Country: Karukinka

Selkʼnam, also known by the exonym Ona, is a language formerly spoken by the Selkʼnam people in Isla Grande de Tierra del Fuego in southernmost South America.

One of the Chonan languages of Patagonia, Selkʼnam is now extinct, due to the late 19th-century Selkʼnam genocide by European immigrants, high fatalities due to disease, and disruption of traditional society. The last fluent native speakers died in the 1980s. Radboud University linguist Luis Miguel Rojas-Berscia worked with two individuals to write a reference grammar of the language, namely, Herminia Vera Ilioyen (died 2014), a semi-speaker who spoke Selkʼnam until the age of 8, and Joubert "Keyuk" Yanten, a young man who started learning the language after learning he was part-Selkʼnam at the age of 8. At the time the grammar was written, the latter was believed to be the only living individual fluent in Selkʼnam, albeit not natively.

== Classification ==
Within the Southern Chon language family, Selkʼnam is closest to Haush, another language spoken on the island of Tierra del Fuego.

There is speculation that Chon together with the Moseten languages, a small group of languages in Bolivia, form part of a Moseten-Chonan language family.

== History ==
The Selkʼnam people, also known as the Ona, are an Indigenous people who inhabited the northeastern part of the archipelago of Tierra del Fuego for thousands of years before Europeans arrived. They were nomads known as "foot-people," as they did their hunting on land, rather than being seafarers.

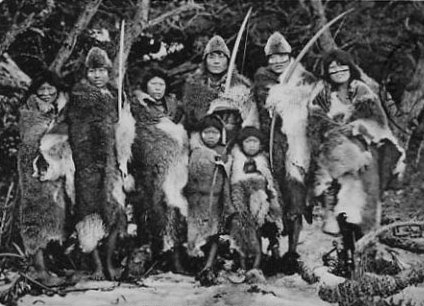
A Selkʼnam family

The last full-blooded Selkʼnam, Ángela Loij, died in 1974. They were one of the last aboriginal groups in South America to be reached by Europeans. Their language, believed to be part of the Chonan family, is considered extinct as the last native speakers died in the 1980s. Currently, Selkʼnam communities are revitalizing the language. A man of mixed Selkʼnam and Mapuche ancestry, Joubert Yanten Gomez (Indigenous name: Keyuk), has successfully taught himself the language.

== Phonology ==
Based on available data, Selkʼnam seems to have had 3 vowels and 23 consonants.

=== Vowels ===
Selkʼnam's three vowels were /a, ɪ, ʊ/.

=== Tone ===
There was also a simple tone system, which Najlis (1973) analyzed as high and low tone, and Martini (1982) analyzed as pitch accent.

=== Consonants ===
Consonants
		Bilabial	Alveolar		Post- alveolar	Velar	Uvular	Glottal
		Bilabial	dental	plain	Post- alveolar	Velar	Uvular	Glottal
Nasal		m		n				
Plosive/ Affricate	plain	p		t	t͡ʃ	k	q	ʔ
Plosive/ Affricate	glottalized	pˀ		tˀ	t͡ʃˀ	kˀ	qˀ	ʔ
Fricative			s̪	s	ʂ	x		h
Liquid	rhotic			ɾ				
Liquid	lateral			l				
Semivowel		w			j			

== Grammar ==
The Selkʼnam language is an object–verb–subject language (OVS). This is a rare word order: only 1% of languages use it as their default word order. There are only two word classes in Selkʼnam: nouns and verbs.

== Vocabulary ==
The Selkʼnam language has Chonan vocabulary similar to the Haush language, though some words have been adopted from Spanish and English, such as the word for 'cat', in Selkʼnam, kʼlattítaŭ; from the Spanish word gatito, which translates to 'kitten'.

=== Comparative vocabulary ===
The following is a list of examples of comparative vocabulary from Chonan languages: Selkʼnam, Haush and Tehuelche; and also vocabulary from the unrelated Yahgan (Yámana).

English	Selkʼnam	Haush	Tehuelche	Yahgan
Egg	Heil	Hel	Hel	Hach
Man	Chon	Kon	Chonke	Ona
Woman	Naa	Mna	Karken, naa	Kipa
Hand	Chen	Chen	Chen	Marʼpo
I, me	Ya		Iá, ya	
Sea	Koy	Kowen, chowen	Koy	Yká
You	Ma, mak		Maha, maak	Sa

== See also ==
- List of endangered languages
- Languages of Argentina
- Languages of Chile
