= Rodolfo Casamiquela =

Argentine paleontologist and archeologist

Rodolfo Magín Casamiquela
- Born: December 11, 1932; Ingeniero Jacobacci, Río Negro Province, Argentina
- Died: December 5, 2008 (aged 75); Cipolletti, Río Negro Province, Argentina
- Scientific career
- Fields: paleontology

Rodolfo Magín Casamiquela (December 11, 1932 – December 5, 2008) was an Argentine paleontologist, archaeologist, historian, writer, and teacher best known for discovering the dinosaur Pisanosaurus mertii in 1967.

== Awards ==
- Konex Platino (2006)

== Honors ==
Casamiquela is commemorated in the scientific name of a species of lizard, Liolaemus casamiquelai.

== Books ==
Casamiquela published over 20 books and various reports. This list contains some of them (all in Spanish):

- Sobre la significación mágica del arte rupestre nordpatagónico (1960)
- Estudio de Nillatum y la religión araucana (1964)
- Rectificaciones y ratificaciones hacia una interpretación definitiva del panorama etnológico de la Patagonia y área septentrional adyacente (1965)
- Noticias sobre una breve expedición arqueológica a la zona de Lihuel Calel (provincia de la Pampa) y observaciones complementarias (1967)
- En pos del gualicho (1988)
- El otro lado de los viajes (1993)
- Toponimia indígena de la provincia de La Pampa (2005)
- Los ríos mesetarios norpatagónicos: aguas generosas del Ande al Atlántico (2010, publicación póstuma, con varios autores)
