= Tehuelche language =

Recently extinct Chonan language of Patagonia

Tehuelche
- Patagón
- aonekko ʼaʼien
- Pronunciation: [aonekʼo ʔaʔjen]
- Native to: Argentina
- Region: Santa Cruz
- Ethnicity: Tehuelche
- Extinct: January 4, 2019, with the death of Dora Manchado
- Revival: few learners (2012)
- Language family: Chonan: Chon proper; Continental Chon; Tehuelche

Language codes
- ISO 639-3: teh
- Glottolog: tehu1242
- ELP: Tehuelche
- Map with approximate distributions of languages in Patagonia at the time of the Spanish conquest. Source: W. Adelaar (2004): The Andean Languages, Cambridge University Press.

Tehuelche (Aoniken, Inaquen, Gunua-Kena, Gununa-Kena) is one of the Chonan languages of Patagonia. Its speakers, the Tehuelche people, were nomadic hunters who occupied territory in present-day Chile, north of Tierra del Fuego and south of the Mapuche people. It is also known as Aonekkenk or Aonekko ʼaʼien ([aonekʼo ʔaʔjen]).

The decline of the language started with the Mapuche invasion in the north, that was then followed by the occupation of Patagonia by the Argentine and Chilean states and state-facilitated genocide. Tehuelche was considerably influenced by other languages and cultures, in particular Mapudungun (the language of the Mapuche). This allowed the transference of morpho-syntactic elements into Tehuelche. During the 19th and 20th centuries, Spanish became the dominant language as Argentina and Chile gained independence, and Spanish-speaking settlers took possession of Patagonia. Because of these factors the language began dying out. In 1983/84 there were 29 speakers, but by the year 2000 there were only 4 speakers left, and by 2012 only 2. In 2019 the last speaker, Dora Manchado, died. The 2010 National Population Census in Argentina revealed 27,813 people who identified as Tehuelche. Today many members of the Tehuelche ethnic group have limited knowledge of the language and are doing their best to ensure language revival, as Tehuelche is still a very important symbol for the group of people who identify themselves as Tehuelche.

In spite of the death of Manchado in 2019, the language has been documented (from her), recuperated and revitalized by various groups of Aonekkenks, with the collaboration of a group of linguists and anthropologists, that have made various studies and academic works about this language.

== Classification ==
Tehuelche belongs to the Chonan family together with Teushen, Selkʼnam (Ona) and Haush. The latter two languages, spoken by tribes in northeast and far northeast Tierra del Fuego, have different statuses of documentation and linguistic revitalization by their corresponding communities.

== Dialects ==
Mason (1950) lists dialects as:

- Tehuelche
  - Northern
    - Payniken
    - Poya
  - Southern
    - Inaken

== History and demographics ==
The northern Tehuelche were conquered and later assimilated by the Mapuche during the Araucanization of Patagonia. Some 1.7 million Mapuche continue to live in Chile and southwest Argentina. Further south they traded peacefully with y Wladfa, the colony of Welsh settlers. Some Tehuelche learnt Welsh and left their children with the settlers for their education. A solid photographic record was made of this people. However, they were later nearly exterminated in the late 19th-century government-sponsored genocides of Patagonia. Of some 5000 speakers in 1900, as of 2005 there were about 20 speakers left. Tehuelche is now extinct as of 2019.

== Phonology ==
=== Vowels ===
Tehuelche has 3 vocalic qualities which can be short or long.

	Front	Central	Back
Mid	e eː		o oː
Open		a aː	

=== Consonants ===
Tehuelche has 25 consonantal phonemes. Stops can be plain, glottalized or voiced.

		Labial	Dental	Palatal	Velar	Uvular	Glottal
Nasal		m	n				
Stop	plain	p	t	tʃ	k	q	ʔ
Stop	ejective	pʼ	tʼ	tʃʼ	kʼ	qʼ	
Stop	voiced	b	d		ɡ	ɢ	
Fricative			s	ʃ	x	χ	
Approximant		w	l	j			
Trill			r				

== Morphology ==
=== Pronoun ===
	Singular	Dual	Plural
1st person	ia	okwa	oshwa
2nd person	ma꞉	mkma	mshma
3rd person	ta꞉	tkta	tshta

=== Alignment ===
Tehuelche is a Marked nominative alignment language. Nouns are marked for the nominative (subject) but are unmarked in the accusative (object), a rather uncommon feature in world languages.

== Documentation ==
Written documentation of Tehuelche began quite early after contact with Europeans. Early evidence of the language is recorded in the Robert Fitzroy's official report on the journey of the Beagle. Chamberlain's 1911 article gives a comprehensive report on documentation of Tehuelche up to that time.

Fitzroy's English-Patagonian (Tehuelche) vocabulary
English	Tehuelche
Another	Sark.
Axe	pĭkĕl, or pĭckĕl.
Band, worn round hair	cochĭn.
Barberry (the)	călga.
Boat	tă lĭna căr′rŏ.
Balls (two)	somĕy, or somăĭ.
Balls (three)	ăchĭcŏ.
Boots	chŏcă.
Bridle	sumŏ.
Clothes	tĕrŏna.
Comb made of a coarse dry grass	par′chĭn.
Dog	wărchĭn, or wauchĭn, or wachĭn.
Fire	se ăk, or ze ăk.
Give it to me	ey′ nĭ ŏts.
Guanaco	co.
Go away	aūrŏs, or orŏs, and cha′nŏs.
Horse	căl′gŏ.
Knife	pa′ĭkă.
Knife (small)	pepă.
Mantle	chorĭllĭo.
Me	cătĭăm.
Meat	sĕy′pră, or zĕypră.
No	cŏmps.
Ostrich	măs′hlŏrs.
Pole	ask.
Put	caĕ.
Ship	carrŏ.
Sinews of the Ostrich, used for sewing mantles, &c.	ĭllŏyu.
Skunk	sŭrrenă.
Slave	zapallo.
Spurs	ta.
Sword	cuchillo.
Tent	cŏw, or caŭ, or toldo.
Water	la.
Wood	cark.
Yes	ohaĭ.
A particular root which is eaten for food	tŭs.
Another similar root	chalăs.
