= Mbyá Guaraní people =

Indigenous people in South America

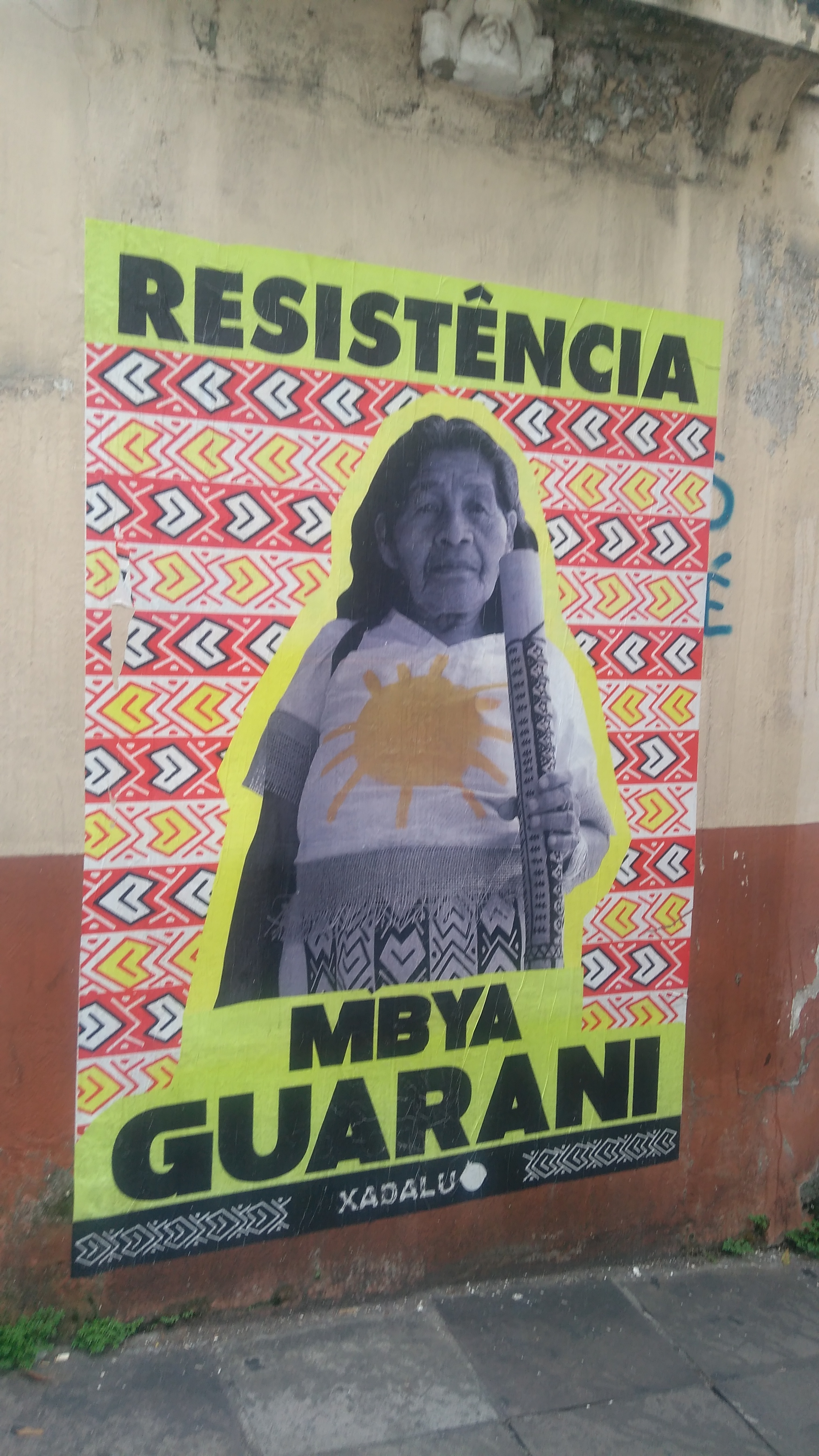
- A sign reading "Mbyá Guaraní Resistance" in Porto Alegre, Brazil.

Total population
- 33,801

Regions with significant populations
- Paraguay: 12,100
- Brazil: 8,400
- Argentina: 3,000
- Uruguay: 10,301

Languages
- Guaraní (Mbyá), Portuguese, Spanish

Related ethnic groups
- Guaraní, Guarani-Kaiowá

The Mbyá, also called Mbyá Guaraní (in Mbyá: mby’as), are a branch of the Guaraní people who live in South America, across a wide territory that ranges through Paraguay, Brazil, Argentina, and Uruguay.

== Branch of the Guaraní people ==
Because of their linguistic similarities and similar rituals, linguists and anthropologists consider the Mbyá, along with the Pai Tavytera, Eastern Bolivian Guaraní, Guarayos, Chané, and others, as a subgroup of the Guaraní people.

Although they are now known by the name "Mbyá," they refer to themselves as the "Nhandeva," a word that means "us" or "our people," which is also the name used internally by various other Guaraní peoples. Another such group, often referred to by ethnographers as the Nhandeva, is called "Chiripá" by the Mbyá, and the two groups each claim exclusive status as the true Guaraní.

The ritual name used by the Mbyá to refer to themselves is Jeguakava Tenonde Porangue'í, meaning "the First Chosen to Carry the Sacred Adornment of Feathers" or "The First Adorned."

== Pre-history ==
Many archeological remains point to the presence of the Guaraní peoples in a wide swath of South America dating long before colonial powers arrived.

There is no consensus among specialists as to when they arrived in the Southern Cone, where they had settled by the time the conquistadors reached the region. Some archeologists estimate that, between 3,000 and 5,000 years ago, proto-Guaraní collectives, perhaps motivated by a population spike, migrated from the Amazon basin to the south, occupying territories already home to other groups. Although there is evidence of such mobility among the proto-Guaraní, they were not primarily hunter-gatherer nomads but relied on planting grains, vegetables, and tubers for nutrition. They would plant these crops in the middle of the forest, opening clearings with controlled burn techniques.

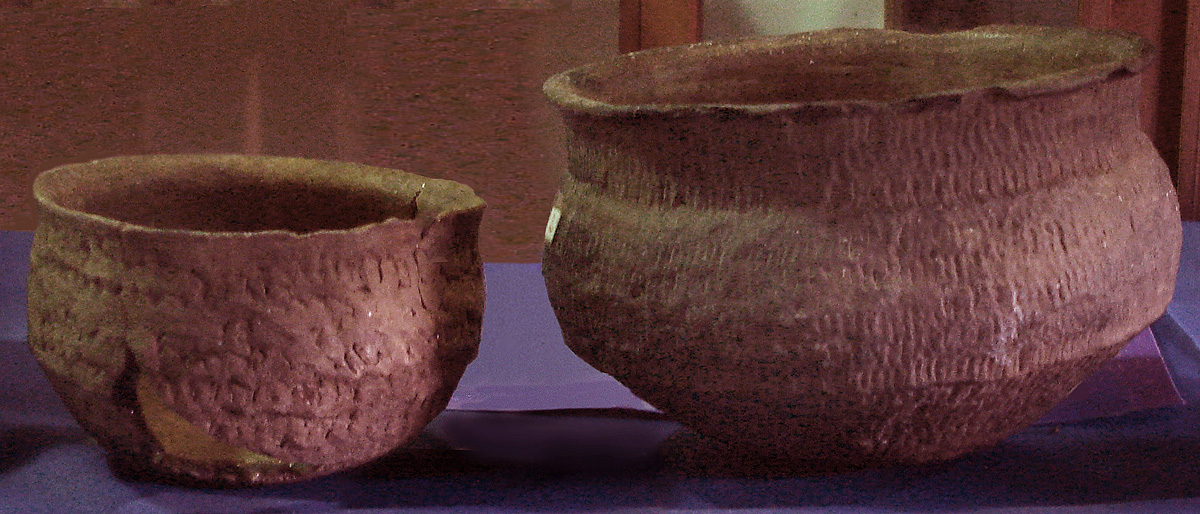
Ancient Guaraní pots used as funerary urns.

The proto-Guaraní from whom the Mbyá descended were also potters and basket-weavers, producing objects used to collect, prepare, and serve food. Researchers have found clay pots used as funeral urns, arrowheads, and other inorganic materials at proto-Guaraní archeological sites.

Based on the location of these archeological sites, experts guess that the Guaraní, in the period prior to European contact, were present in the Atlantic Forest, Araucaria moist forests, and other rainforest and deciduous forest environments. They lived in family groups of varying sizes and obtained everything they needed from their environment, including through collecting medicinal plants, constructing traps for hunting, and crafting pottery.

== History ==
=== Jesuit Reductions (17th-18th centuries) ===
In the 18th century, the Mbyá were identified as inhabitants of the Mba'everá forest. In that period they lived, among other places, in the jungles between the Acaray River and the Monday River in what is now Paraguay. They were also referred to as the Tarumá, Apyteré, Tembekuá, Tambeaopé, Ka'yngua, Ka’yguá, Cainguá, or Baticola.

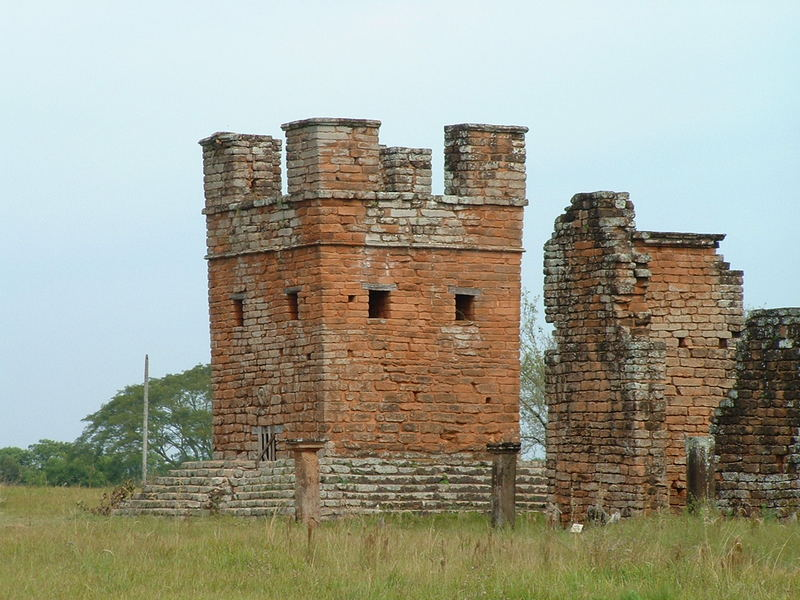
Ruins of the Trinidad Jesuit reduction in Paraguay.

There is no consensus among anthropologists as to the ancestry of the contemporary Mbyá, Nhandeva, and Pai Tavytera groups, or as to whether they were among the Guaraní who entered settlements organized by Portuguese Jesuit missionaries that were known as Jesuit reductions. One hypothesis points to the possibility that the Mbyá had resisted conversion to Catholicism and settling in Jesuit reductions, whereas the Nhandeva were the descendants of Guaranís who participated in the Jesuits' conversion process. Another thesis posits that none of these groups had submitted to the missionary process, choosing to preserve their independence despite frequent displacement from territory that is now part of Paraguay, Brazil, Uruguay and Argentina. The latter theory maintains that the differences between these various Guaraní peoples stems from different kinship and family ties as the Guaraní population decreased during the missionary period. This theory also argues that many of the surviving Guaraní groups who had settled in the reductions fled to live in the forests during the 1756 Guaraní War.

Both of these theories aim to explain changes in Guaraní cosmology to incorporate some European-influenced elements, which persist to this day. These changes include abandoning ritual cannibalism, incorporating aspects of Christian eschatology into Guaraní shamanism, and, in the case of the Mbyá and Nhandeva, the reproduction and use of objects brought by the Jesuits, including musical instruments such as the ravé (rabeca) and the mbaraká (guitar).

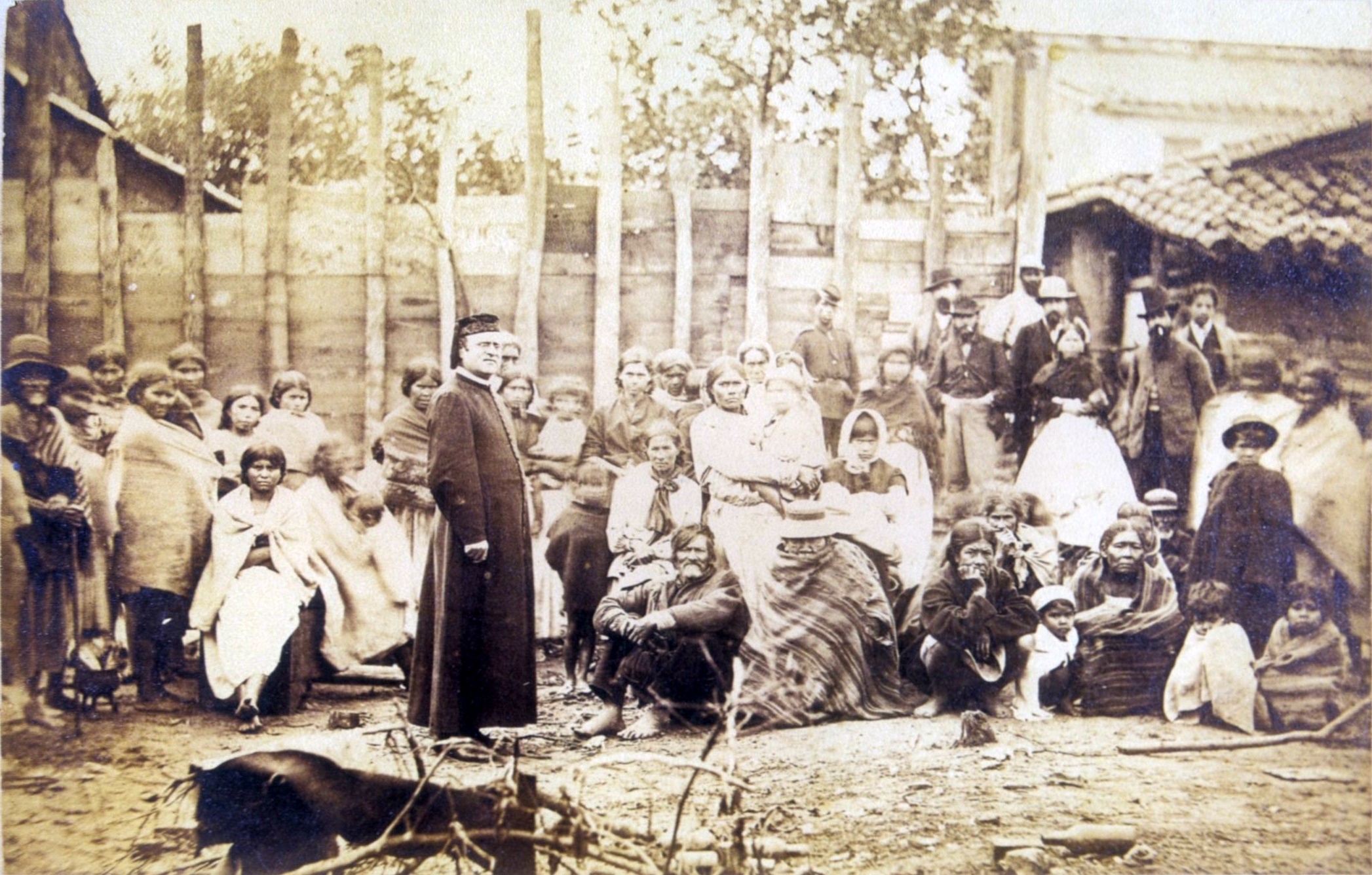
A Brazilian priest with indigenous survivors of the Paraguayan War, including Mbyá Guaraní (in the lower right-hand corner), in 1869.

=== Paraguayan War (1864-1870) ===
The Mbyá were among the Guaraní peoples who were forced to fight on both the Paraguayan and Brazilian sides during the Paraguayan War. There are no estimates of how many Guaranís, fighters and civilians alike, died in the war, because they were lumped in with all other "peasants" and "soldiers" in contemporary Paraguayan government records as part of an "ethnic denial" policy that was very typical of the period.

The Paraguayan War is considered one of the worst massacres in the history of the Americas. Historians diverge greatly as to how many died in the war and how much territory Paraguay lost to Brazil. Mbyá oral history contains various stories related to the Paraguayan War. Many speak of the terrible violence suffered by their ancestors, of the forced enlistment of men near the front lines of the war, and of their ancestors fleeing the conflict zones.

== Demographics ==
In Paraguay, the 1981 census identified 5,500 people of Mbyá ethnicity. The 1992 census identified 4,744. At the Paraguayan Forum of Indigenous Groups (FEPI), in 1995 there were 10,990 Mbyá represented. The difference between these numbers can be attributed to a resistance toward national censuses among members of the Amerindian group. Other estimates in the year 2000 indicated an even higher 12,100 Mbyá in Paraguay.

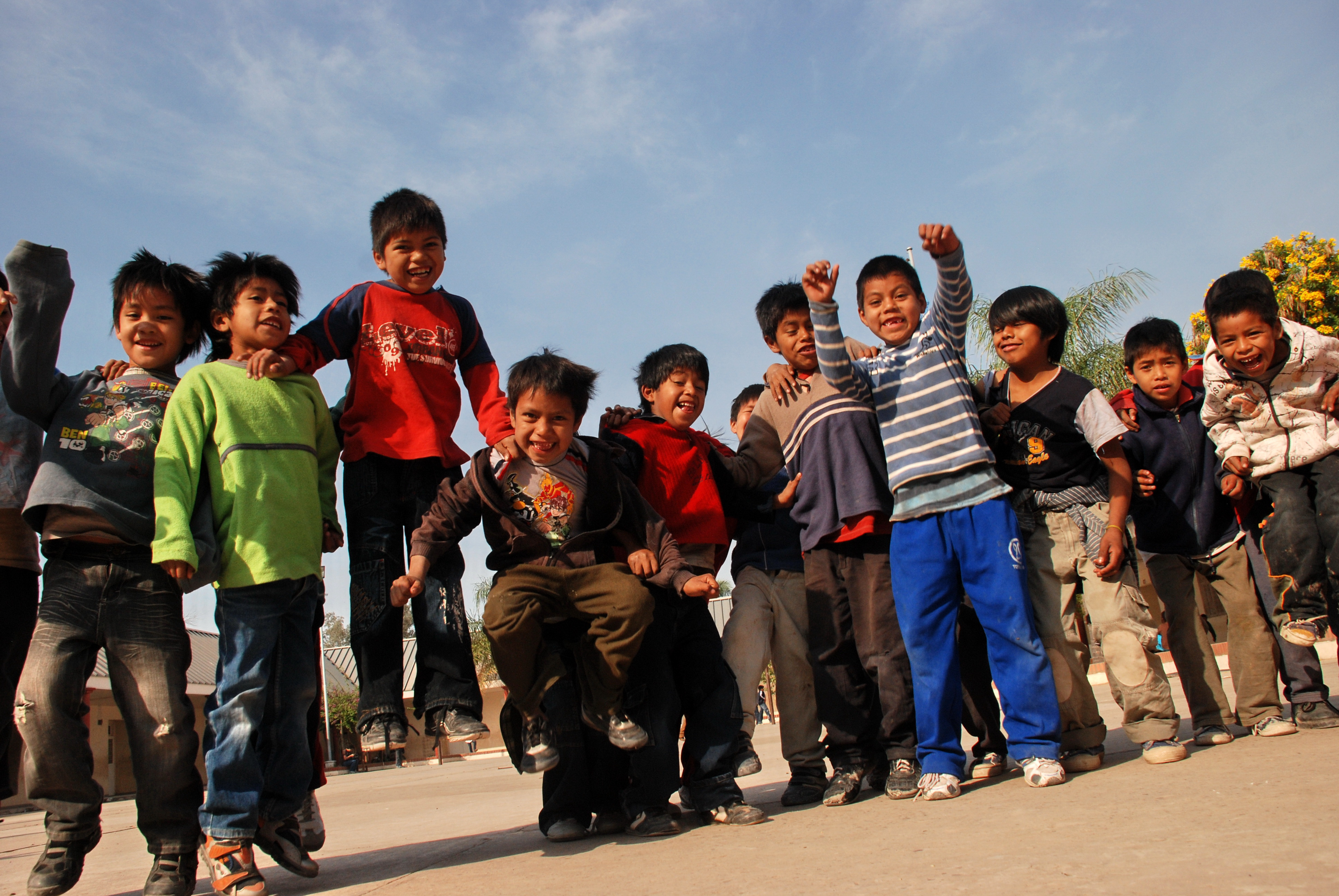
Mbyá children in Kaaguy Poty, Misiones, Argentina.

In the Argentine region of Misiones, Mbyá coexist, in the same familial communities, with members of the Xiripá Guaraní and Pai Tavytera groups. There are 74 such communities, known as tekoás, in the region, and there are approximately 3,000 Mbyá in Argentina as a whole. Two large communities in Misiones near Iguazu Falls, Fortin Mborore and Yriapú, are home to more than 600 people, many of them coming from Paraguay or Brazil.

In Brazil, the Mbyá population is concentrated in the south and southeast, in the hills of the Atlantic Forest and along the coast. There are also some small and mid-size groups on demarcated indigenous land further inland. They are also commonly found in roadside camps in the states of Paraná, Santa Catarina, and Rio Grande do Sul, mainly along the BR-101 and BR-116 highways. According to the Instituto Socioambiental, a Brazilian environmental and indigenous rights organization, there are currently 8,400 Mbyá in Brazil. There are also communities containing descendants of a single Mbyá family that, after the Paraguayan War, migrated to Brazil's North Region, settled in the forests of Pará and Tocantins states, and, with time, spread in small familial groups throughout central-western Brazil.

There are also a small number of Mbyá living in Uruguay, split between the Tekoá Marae´i community near Santiago Vázquez and a community in the Treinta y Tres area.

== Present-day ==
=== Organization ===
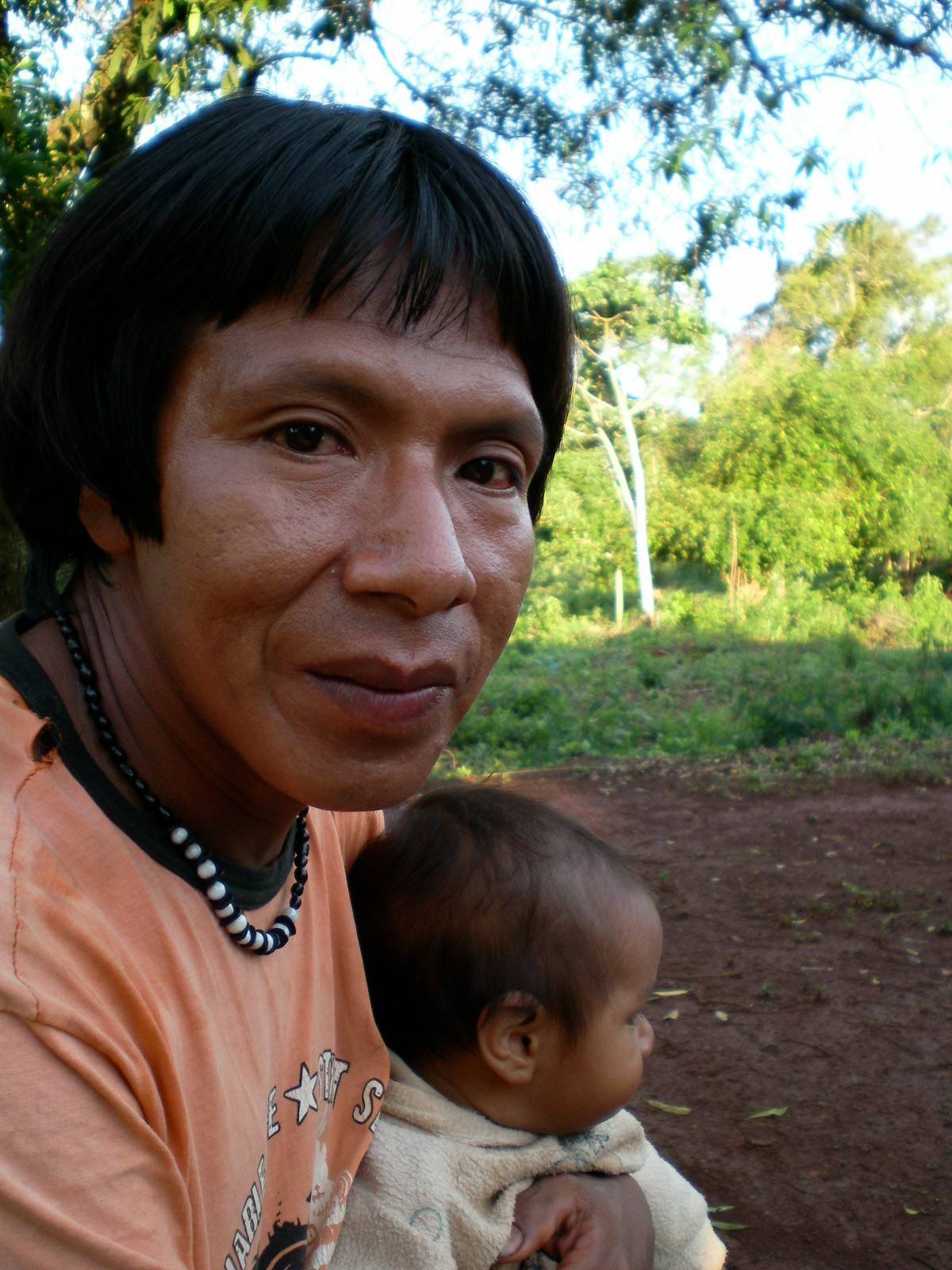
A chief of one Mbyá tribe visiting the Yriapú village in Misiones, Argentina.

Generally, the Mbyá live in small groups of four or five families, distributed in temporary camps and villages. The temporary camps are usually found along the roadside, where the group members often sell handicrafts. The villages are larger and more permanent settlements, found both within and outside of demarcated indigenous land. These villages are known as tekoa, and they're ideally in places where the traditional Mbyá way of life, referred to as ñande reko, can be reproduced. They are characterized by the presence of a traditional house of worship known as an opy, used to perform rituals. These villages are also ideally surrounded by forests and fields, with a good water source, but this is not always possible for today's Mbyá. The Mbyá hunt, fish, and gather food, as well as plant crops in their fields, principally maize (avatí), cassava (mandió), potatoes, peanuts (manduí), beans (kumandá), squash (mindain), and watermelon (janjau). Today, the spaces occupied by Mbyá communities are less and less able to provide them with the resources they need, making it necessary for them to consume industrial products.

The communities are usually headed by two leaders: a spiritual leader or shaman, known as a karaí, and a political leader or chief, known as mburuvichá, who is responsible for contact with those outside the village. Sometimes these two roles are combined.

The Mbyá are present between the Apa River and the Paraná River in southern Paraguay, primarily scattered across the Paraguayan department of Guairá. They also live in the Argentine province of Misiones and parts of southern and southeastern Brazil and some areas in Uruguay, reaching the Brazilian coast. This multinational slice of land corresponds to what the Mbyá consider their original territory. Mobility is one of the group's primary characteristics, and the Mbyá are constantly circulating throughout this territory. However, national borders, restrictions on entering private property, and governments' designations of tribal reserves make this characteristic cultural practice difficult to continue.

=== Culture ===
The Mbyá speak a different dialect of Guaraní than that spoken in Paraguay, with distinct phonetics, morphology, syntax, and vocabulary. The Mbyá dialect is then divided into two sub-dialects, the tambéopé and the baticola. Many Mbyá are trilingual, speaking Mbyá, Paraguayan Guaraní, and Spanish, for those living in Spanish-speaking areas. Those who live in Brazil often also speak Portuguese.

The spoken word is of central importance in Mbyá culture. Traditionally, the Mbyá culture had no writing system, so the spoken word was the only way to transfer customs and knowledge. Knowledge is transmitted through conversation around the fire, accompanied by drinking maté and smoking a pipe known as a petyngua, as well as through rituals in the opy house of worship. Speech is considered a divine attribute, the result of cosmic inspiration. In Mbyá tradition, the creator figure is described as a spirit, nhe’e, who represents speech and eloquence as derived from the gods. Verbal dialogue is also the principal means of communication between the Mbyá and the outside world. Speaking the Mbyá language is a mark of identity for the group. To be considered Mbyá, one must speak the language and live among family in the community.

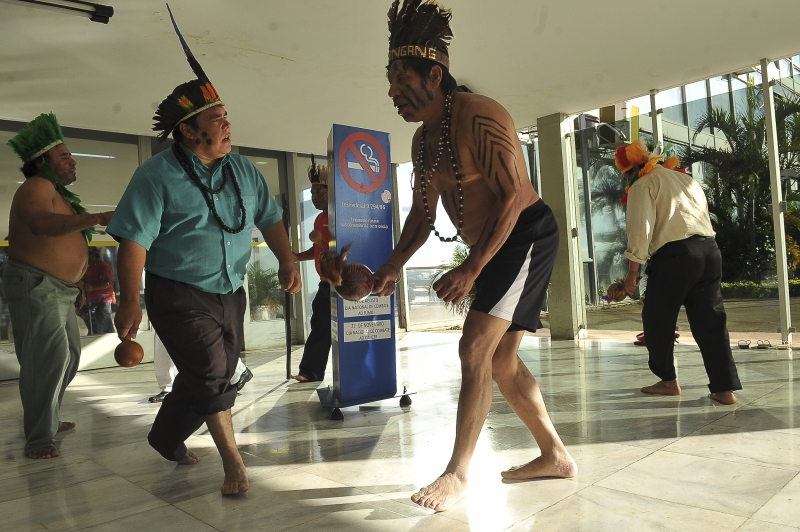
Members of the Kaingang, Mbyá, and Charrúa people occupy the lobby of the Brazilian Health Ministry in Brasília.

The concept of family and parentage among the Mbyá is directly related to their geographic mobility, a noteworthy characteristic of the group's culture. The most basic social structure of the group is the nuclear family, followed by the extended family, made up of all blood relatives. There is, however, a generic term for "relative," retarã. All Mbyá are considered retarã—that is to say, they are all considered relatives. This broad conception of community allows for the Mbyá's territorial mobility. Individuals and families are always moving, rarely staying more than one or two years in each place that they settle. They circulate among the various villages and encampments of their people: visiting relatives, spreading news, participating in rituals and activities that require collective work (such as constructing buildings), seeking spouses, trading objects, and so on. Death, disease, a lack of resources, and internal political conflicts are also reasons that Mbyá individuals and families migrate. Traveling by foot (jeguatá), much like speaking, is seen as having a divine aspect. It forms part of the composition of Mbyá identity.

Rituals are special collective moments for the Mbyá community. One of the group's most traditional rituals is the Ñemongarai, the child-naming ritual, which happens during the peak of the maize harvest. In this ritual, a shaman who does not belong to the community (a nod to the cultural importance of mobility) names the children of the village. Based on each small child's behavior, the shaman attempts to determine which divine being of the Mbyá pantheon sent its spirit to the child, and the shaman gives them a name related to the divine being and its characteristics. This moment is considered the point at which the child's soul is incorporated into their body, when they become an Mbyá.

In general, times of abundance and harvest are celebrated with collective rituals, when possible. When various groups meet in a village, to resolve political issues or hold celebrations, it's common for those gathered to hold a welcome ritual with music and dancing. These gatherings are marked by conversation, the serving of traditional foods, and a festive climate, given the importance of collective efforts and the gathering of relatives for the Mbyá.

=== Health and Shamanism ===
Today the Mbyá are confined in small areas, and the environments necessary to sustain their traditional way of life are disappearing, so they have been forced to adopt certain ways of life of those who they refer to as juruá (descendants of Europeans, literally "mouth with hair"). This higher level of contact has caused serious and growing damage to their health. Diseases previously unknown among Mbyá communities have reached their villages. This has made it necessary for the Mbyá to adopt some medical practices from the outside world.

Traditionally, healing treatment through medicinal plants is provided by shamans called karaí, also known as opy'guá or "lord of the opy," who also perform rituals meant to influence the weather, prevent future events, and ensure fruitful hunts and harvests. These shamans also lead ritual songs and dances, as well as determine the spiritual names of small children. Their most important function is telling the creation myths, which are also believed to have curative power. These spiritual leaders are divided by age, experience, and knowledge, although these divisions are not primarily hierarchical. Both women and men can be shamans, with the men referred to as karaí and the women as kunhã-karaí. Practicing traditional Mbyá medicine has been made more difficult by deforestation: Many shamans find it increasingly difficult to find the herbs that they need for their treatments. Consequentially, young Mbyá often lack the knowledge of medicinal plants that their ancestors long passed on.

=== Differing Circumstances ===
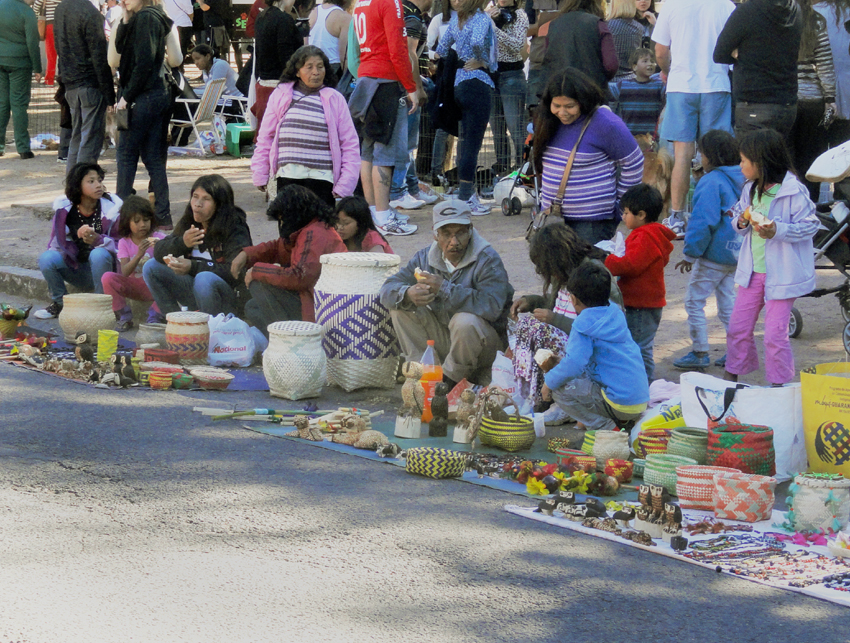
Guaraní along the roadside in Feira do Bom Fim, Porto Alegre, Brazil.

The situations in which Mbyá communities find themselves are diverse. There are groups in the forests of Paraguay and the Gran Chaco who remain relatively isolated from society. On the other hand, in Argentina, some communities that are confined in tribal reserves rely on lunch distributed by bilingual schools as their only real source of food. The familial groups who travel outside the villages and indigenous territories in Argentina and Brazil usually make their living by selling handicrafts, products that reference Mbyá material culture and cosmology, and by providing agricultural labor for private landowners. When they establish themselves in a particular location, they are also able to seek out government aid.

In Brazil over the past decade, groups of young Mbyá singers and dancers have begun performing at schools and universities. Some of these performing groups, through working with partners outside the Mbyá, have recorded their songs on CDs that they sell along with their handicrafts to supplement their income. These performers also aim to spread awareness of the indigenous cause in Brazil and inform Brazilians of the Mbyá culture and way of life.
