= Western Bolivian Guarani =

Language of Bolivia

- Simba, Simba Guarani
- Native to: Bolivia, Argentina, Paraguay
- Native speakers: 7,000 (2002)
- Language family: Tupian: Tupi–Guarani; Guarani (I); Guarani; Western Bolivian Guarani

Language codes
- ISO 639-3: gnw
- Glottolog: west2640
- ELP: Simba Guaraní
- Linguasphere: 88-AAI-fca

Western Bolivian Guarani, known locally as Simba and Simba Guarani, is a Guarani language spoken in Bolivia, in the Chuquisaca Department north of the Pilcomayo River.

Western Bolivian Guarani is one of a number of "Guarani dialects" considered distinct languages by Ethnologue: Chiripá, Eastern Bolivian Guarani, Mbyá Guarani, Aché, Kaiwá, Xetá, and Paraguayan Guaraní. Of these, Paraguayan Guaraní is by far the most widely spoken variety and it is often referred to simply as Guaraní.
