= Oltre (album) =

Studio album by Claudio Baglioni
- Released: November 17, 1990
- Recorded: Real World Studios; Townhouse Studios; Studio de la Grande Armée; Forum Music Village; Pick Up; Studio Emme; Easy Records; Linford Manor
- Genre: World; Pop; Ballad
- Length: 99 m
- Language: Italian
- Label: CBS Records International
- Producer: Claudio Baglioni

Claudio Baglioni chronology
La vita è adesso (1985)	Oltre (1990)	Io sono qui (1995)

Oltre - un mondo uomo sotto un cielo mago, simply known as Oltre, is the eleventh studio album by Italian songwriter Claudio Baglioni, released on 17 November 1990 by CBS Italiana, a subsidiary label of CBS Records International.

The album is characterized by world music features and it was recorded in the Real World Studios of English songwriter Peter Gabriel and in several European recording studios. Baglioni defined the album as the first of a trilogy about time: Oltre represents the past, Io sono qui is the present and Viaggiatore sulla coda del tempo represents the future.

The concept album divided critics due to its complexity and completely different format respect the previous works by Baglioni, it is also the most successful double album in Italian discography.

The album is based on a narrative inspired by Guscio, an epic poem written by Claudio Baglioni and included in the album’s box set distributed to the 500,000 fans who had pre-ordered it. Described by Baglioni as a “magical” work, it is conceived as a journey in search of one’s origins and destiny.

The album follows a stream-of-consciousness structure centered on Cucaio, Baglioni’s alter ego, whose story is told in reverse. It is divided into four sections corresponding to the four natural elements—water, fire, earth, and air—while the cover artwork, inspired by Aboriginal art, reinforces the symbolic dimension of the project.

== Recording ==
In summer 1988, Baglioni began to compose a new album three years later the release of La vita è adesso. First recording sessions were made in the Real World Studios near Bath, under the direction of Celso Valli and Pasquale Mineri, while Peter Gabriel was recording his soundtrack for The Last Temptation of Christ.

The collaboration with Pasquale Minieri, which would become central to the genesis of the project, had its roots in the immediately preceding years, particularly during the period of the Assolo tour. Minieri, who had studied at the conservatory under the guidance of Professor Franco Sbacco — an expert in electronic music — was already working extensively with synthesizers and computers, while also developing a strong passion for early twentieth-century classical music, particularly Stravinsky and Mahler. From this background emerged the idea of conceiving sound itself as a compositional element, a continuous search for timbral elaboration made possible by new electronic machines.

This approach fascinated Baglioni and contributed to the development of a relationship of mutual respect that strengthened during Assolo, initially planned as a single-date show and later expanded into a tour of sixty-five concerts. Throughout the tour, the two worked daily to improve the performance, experimenting with new sonic and musical solutions even during the breaks between shows. It was in this context that the idea for a new album, profoundly different from the previous ones, began to take shape.

On Topolino n. 1703, Baglioni implicitly revealed in an interview that his new album would be entitled A presto. Mineri said in an interview:

[...] There is a complicated process if you want to work with Claudio [Baglioni]. In a very first step, he took me to listen only the instrumental part, but he wrote all short stuffs, lasting about twenty seconds. Like... consider... 120 or 150 bars on the piano, and other 100 on the guitar. Very short musical things of twenty seconds, thirty seconds max. Then, we continued to choose, among all of these pieces, those we liked and to give them a definition in the various structures of the song. I mean: this song of thirty seconds is good for a verse, that for a riff, that for a bridge. [...] Then we tried to put togher all of that pieces in all the possible ways, until we came to the phase with the completed songs which were more than twenty (at last we chose only twenty). The lyrics phase, due to his way of working, came just at the end and, once the disc was completed from the musical point of view, he wrote all the lyrics three times: he did not like them and trashed them, and he rewrote them again.

— Pasquale Mineri

The preliminary work took place mainly in Ansedonia, where Baglioni and Minieri spent about a year and a half composing, recording, editing, and preparing the musical material. During this phase, Baglioni wrote numerous fragments of about twenty seconds that were later assembled as structural elements of the songs — introductions, hooks, verses, or musical bridges — eventually resulting in around forty compositions complete from a musical standpoint. Only later were twenty tracks selected for inclusion on the album.

On 8 September 1988, the Italian leg of the Human Rights Now! tour took place at the Stadio Comunale in Turin, featuring Bruce Springsteen, Sting, Peter Gabriel, Youssou N'Dour and Tracy Chapman. Baglioni was chosen as the Italian representative, performing songs related to the theme of the event and declaring his decision to take part in the concert in support of the human rights cause.

During the performance, in contrast to the stands of the stadium filled with fans of the singer-songwriter applauding him, a section of the audience gathered under the stage began to contest Baglioni. Contemporary reports mention tomatoes and small bottles thrown at the singer, who responded by recalling the importance of the humanitarian cause behind the event, which went beyond the simple “desire to be together.” The situation became so tense that Peter Gabriel was forced to go on stage during the performance and improvise a duet with Baglioni in order to calm the protest. Despite this, Baglioni completed the concert. The episode had a strong impact on him, leading him to withdraw from public appearances for a period and to focus exclusively on the album.

Meanwhile, recording session proceeded in different studios located in Europe, with the collaboration of international artists and collaborators of Peter Gabriel, like Tony Levin and Manu Katché, as well as Italian stars like Pino Daniele and Mia Martini. Spanish guitarist Paco de Lucía and Senegalese singer Youssou N'Dour took part to the project. Artists contributed with their native culture and music, giving to the album an ethnic sound.

The decision to involve musicians from different musical cultures responded to a precise artistic intention: to enrich the project’s sonic identity through stylistic cross-influences. Each musician contributed not only technical skill but also imagination and personal interpretation. Manu Katché, for example, often asked to play the same piece in numerous variations to explore its expressive possibilities before choosing the final version. In some sessions, as recalled by Minieri, the studio lights were even turned off to encourage the musicians’ instinctive improvisation and prevent them from reading the chords.

An emblematic episode concerns the song Io dal mare: the piano part originated from an idea spontaneously proposed by David Sancious — a member of Bruce Springsteen’s E Street Band — who was working in the same studio with Peter Gabriel. After hearing the song during a break, he suggested a musical solution that was retained in the final version.

In October 1989, pre-orders for the album began under the provisional title Un mondo più uomo sotto un cielo mago. CBS, however, postponed the album’s release to 1990, which fueled rumors that Baglioni was not satisfied with the work completed up to that point and had therefore decided to completely rewrite the album, delaying its release.

When the project reached the final selection stage — from the initial forty compositions to the twenty that would be included on the album — Claudio Baglioni began writing the definitive lyrics. However, it was a difficult moment: he did not feel convinced by what he was writing and sensed a gap between the project’s original idea and the form it was taking.

During 1990, as media pressure grew rapidly due to the anticipation surrounding the album — with about half a million copies already pre-ordered — the artist went through a period of profound personal and professional crisis. Beyond the events connected to the Amnesty concert in Turin, he distanced himself from Rossella Barattolo, a manager from Taranto whom he had met in 1986 and who had become a key figure in coordinating his professional activities. The singer-songwriter had begun a romantic relationship with her which, although initially kept secret, had already become the subject of gossip in journalistic circles. When paparazzi managed to reveal and publicize the relationship in 1989 — publishing photos and reports about their secret affair — the couple came under intense pressure from the public and the media. This escalation of attention contributed to their temporary separation in 1990. The emotional instability was reflected directly in the work: once again Baglioni tore up the lyrics he had already written, reconsidering the entire project.

The situation also became delicate from a contractual perspective. Since the record company had already begun pre-orders and distribution planning, the delay risked exposing it to penalties and legal action for missing the scheduled deadlines.

The turning point came through a discussion with Fabrizio Intra, a longtime friend and CBS executive, and a clarifying conversation with his wife Paola Massari, who had always collaborated on his work and who — despite the marital crisis and the extramarital relationship — continued to support and assist him. Having regained a new sense of focus, Baglioni decided to return to work with a different, more inspired and radical spirit.

The first words he wrote during this new phase were “The immense breath of the ocean”, a line that would become the opening of the album’s final track, Pace. From that point he resumed the entire lyrical structure by drawing from a large poem previously written in stream-of-consciousness form, titled Guscio: a kind of primordial nucleus of the concept, the original container from which all the songs would develop.

From a musical standpoint, the project was already defined. Baglioni rewrote the lyrics several times without altering the musical bases previously completed with Minieri. The only subsequent step was the selection of the songs to be included in the double album and the definition of their final order, a crucial decision for the narrative coherence of the work. Once the definitive writing of all twenty lyrics was completed, Baglioni returned to that first poetic fragment from which the creative process had resumed — which in the concept corresponded to the final narrative moment of the album — and added the concluding phrase: “now I am free, a man, beyond”, destined to become the final words of the work and to symbolically close the existential journey told in the album.

In August 1990 the album was finally completed and the final recordings took place. Claudio Baglioni, Pasquale Minieri and Paola Massari then established the definitive tracklist, carefully choosing the order of the songs that would give narrative shape and structure to the entire album.

== Concept ==
Oltre is conceived as the poem of modern man: an inner journey in which myth and memory, childhood and destiny intertwine. The protagonist is Cucaio, the author’s alter ego, derived from the name Baglioni used to call himself as a child. He is not a hero, but a man searching for himself “under a magic sky”, lost in the labyrinth of time.

Like a contemporary Odysseus, Cucaio crosses a sea that is not only water but a liquid consciousness: each song represents a step in a return toward the origin, not toward a place, but toward what we have been and continue to be. The journey touches birth, love, guilt, loss and finally peace — not as an ending, but as understanding.

The album unfolds like a spiral: rather than moving in a straight line, it continually returns to itself, as memory does when it reconnects the past with the present. In the booklet — a flow of thoughts, symbols and colors inspired by primitive art — Cucaio becomes an archetype: the child, the poet, the man, the double. Baglioni’s language follows this movement, blending mythology, everyday life, linguistic invention and visionary imagery.

A modern poem in which the human being — passing through water, fire, earth and air — learns to look at life without fear and transform pain into awareness. In the end, Cucaio does not find an answer, but a condition: to become “a man, beyond”.

== Composition ==
Oltre is a concept album which follows the story of the alter ego Cucaio, his maturation and his search for himself. The name of the character is inspired by the bad pronunciation that Baglioni had of his name when he was a little child. The songwriter said:

Cucaio is the magical part of the disc, of this wizard sky which is not something impalpable but it is earthly. Cucaio is the man who can not properly pronounce his own name, who doesn't know where he originates neither where he's going; what are his anxieties, his problems and his joys. I believe that in everyone's life there are a human side and a magical one: the first suffers the most, because it knows that it can't emulate the second. This is Cucaio, and he represents the moment when moreover you should leave him in ordert to go beyond.

— Claudio Baglioni

Along with the album, there is a little booklet with a stream of consciousness through which the author explains the Gusci ("Shells") containing meaning of the songs.

=== Disc one ===
Side A

- Dagli il via - In this first track, Baglioni narrates his past with memories appearing without any order, together with questions, lost opportunities, forgotten loves. In the chorus he gives the start to a run for his freedom and his will to find his own destiny and those of the listener. The man running at the beginning of the song is Walter Savelli, the pianist of Baglioni.
- Io dal mare - The sea is depicted as the mother of Cucaio and the whole humanity, giving a visual suggestion. The arpeggio at the beginning of the track was created by David Sancious during a pause from his work with Gabriel for The Last Temptation of Christ, while Pino Daniele contributed with his guitar and style. Manieri said that Pino Daniele wanted to do "that stuff with Claudio" before a surgery to his heart, and the group was temporarily moved to Formia to record the song. In an interview for the journal Chitarre, Baglioni said:

Pino Daniele is a separated chapter. I was very impressed the great Neapolitan character in his voice, in his way to play: that beautiful voice and guitar wail. There's that end at sixth almost resembling a tarantella played in quarters... These are the stuffs that music offers to you: words not mix so easily, they are too heavy.

— Claudio Baglioni

- Naso di falco - The main theme is the moment when man becomes aware to have a dream, while he is looking for himself. The song begins with the depiction of a curious newborn hawk asking the same ingenuous questions that Baglioni asked when he was a child. These kind of questions are alternated with more mature and unanswered ones related to events like the Ustica Massacre in 1980, Timișoara alleged repression in 1989, Colombian conflict, Chernobyl disaster in 1986, and the Heysel Stadium disaster in 1985. At the end, the hawk flies to a place "where a dream is still free and air is not ash".
- Io lui e la cana femmina - It is dedicated to the two German Shepherd dogs owned by Baglioni: he describes them as if they are human beings with whom stroll around, dreaming to be free and without inhibitions like an animal, to be the same. The song features the French musician Richard Galliano with his accordion.
- Stelle di stelle - Baglioni talks about TV and music "stars" of the past whose art continues to live, like the light of stars reaches Earth despite they died millions or billions of years ago due to immense distances in the Universe. The atmosphere is intimate and music is minimal. Mia Martini contributed with her voice and during a 1992 interview for RadioVerdeRai she said:

I think that Stelle di stelle is one of the most beautiful songs ever made. It was an idea of Claudio, he called me and asked me if I was available to sing a track with him in the album.[...] The first time he made me listen to the song it was not exactly like that, as it was later developed by Claudio. It was a shorter track that we had to sing in unison. We had listened together to this first draft, I really liked that, and then Claudio re-called me and he said: 'I've listened to your voice, while you rehearsed with me, and I've changed completely the draft, practically creating a song inside another.

I thought it was a beautiful idea, also really new, because it is a cutting-edge song, no one had written it in that way, both for the melodic and harmonic side. He even added a new part of lyrics, while before we had to sing the same words, suddenly, my voice became a conscience's one.

With my presence, pessimism of the artist who does this journey backwards, and then stops to shine and disappears from the scene, is illuminated for a while by a bit of hope. And therefore I say him those things in order to lift his pessimism: ‘but could the sky end here, could the sea end before the horizon…’ I offer to him this hope which is basically the strength that the artist wants to receive in order to move on, because the road ahead is too hard.

He later added a melodic part, that is the one I sing, that is not consequent to the melody sung by him but it is written as if it is a bass score, even a double bass one. In the song there are very few instruments, there's a piano, drums - only brushes, quite refined and light - and there's that double bass which is marvellously record with three overlays and three different basses, so everything becomes more captivating and involving, my part is musically more intended as a drum between rhythmic and support of the double bass, it is also funny for me to enter in this melody in a complete different way from my normal interpretations.

— MIa Marini

Side B

- Vivi - The song tells the story of an ended love which is not bright as once, but with the desire to become so. It depicts the fury of the will to live. The lyrics has a marked erotic tone and exalts life and sensual passion with the relations between the four elements (Earth, Air, Water and Fire) conceived by pre-Socratic philosophers, as well as the cycle of life. Song ends with a succession of ethnic groups (Ainu, Akha, Lacandon, Tasaday, Nambikwara, Gond, Māori, Maasai, Guna, Hopi, Yanomani, Semang, Onge, Kogi, Waorani, Penan, Caingua, Vedda, Sammi, Caraja, Inuit, Indigenous Australians, Tuareg, Jurana). The track features the purva melakarta succession of Indian carnatic music.
- Le donne sono - Baglioni describes the interaction of men with women and he proposes a series of portraits of women depicted with admiration, irony, affection and perplexity. The song concludes depicting men as sailors in an ocean of women that they will not never understand.
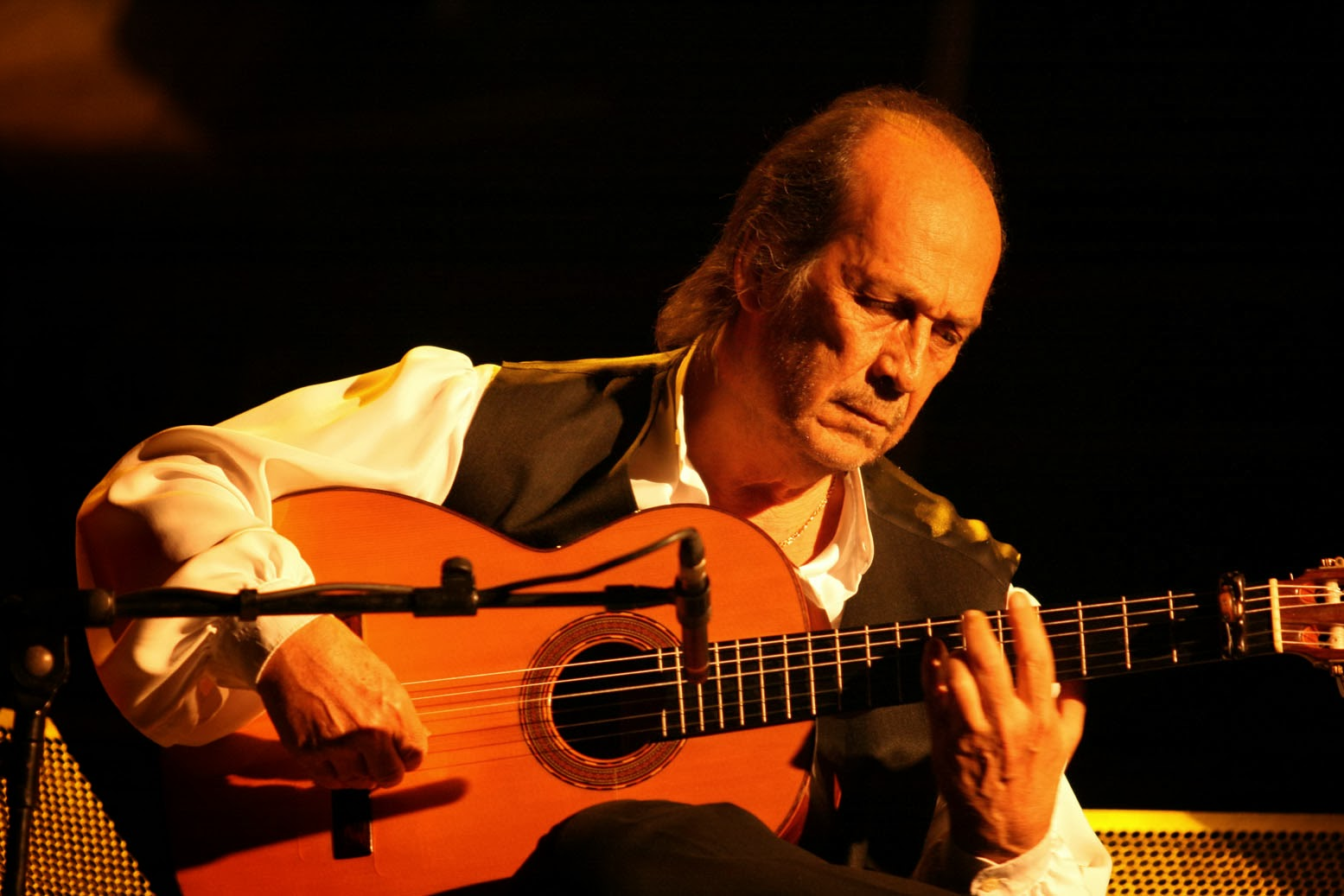
  Paco de Lucìa
- Domani mai - The theme of physical love returns, but this time the song depicts the lament for a future breakup of a couple due to an impossible relationship between the lovers. Paco de Lucìa plays the guitar giving a Spanish atmosphere: during the preparation of the album, de Lucìa studied the sheet for a week and returned to the recording studio with his ideas for the song. Baglioni said about him:

Paco de Lucìa is a musician that I always loved, for his extraordinary ability to create a so particular music, which lives of incredible beats following one other, too hard to count, and also an extraordinary harmonic ability, a world unrolling itself with continuous surprises.

— Claudio Baglioni

- Acqua dalla luna - The song depicts the desire to enchant the audience like a magician or a circus artist and to amaze in particular who is sad, less fortunate or people marginalized for an alleged oddity. The surreal circus of the song has a Fellinian atmosphere and it is full of weird characters (like an unbalanced tightrope walker, a defeated tamer and a mute storyteller), seen by Baglioni with the eyes of a child. A final reflection suggests that it would be nice if artists were allowed to alleviate every kind of sorrow or pain, but it is as impossible as to find fluid water on the Moon.
- Tamburi lontani - Introduced by horns of the London Symphony Orchestra, the song talks about the pain of living. Each person has an own drum, rhythm and singing with which human relations occur. The rhythm in particular has strict bonds with vital pulsations (like the heartbeat) and cycles of Earth (like the alternation of seasons). Baglioni asks a confirm to his interlocutor on the fact that time, despite all odds, has not provoked a definitive departure between each other, and it is related to the separation between his wife, Paola Massari, and his son, Giovanni. At the end, time shows itself again as powerful and indifferent towards human unhappiness, but at the same time there is a drive for rebellion against this condition.

=== Disc two ===
Side A

- Noi no - This song has the attitude of a collective singing which becomes more evident during a concert, where public is directly involved in the performance. It is an anthem dedicated to rebels fighting against injustices, to anyone who wants a better future for himself, future generations and the entire world.
- Signora delle ore scure - The "Lady of dark hours" to whom Baglioni refers is unknown: she is described as a young woman living in the night, maybe from a distant tropical country, and the desire for her is sinful.
- Navigando - A playful romance with a female figure is compared with the sailing of seas. The sailor shipwrecks among beauties from all the world, as if each woman has the beauty of all the women in the world. Baglioni reprises the melakarta from Vivi when he describes somatic features of exotic women, and at the end he realizes he had been like "Odysseus, Sinbad and Gilgamesh": the songwriter has lost himself in his voyage and when the love ends he is alone "like a wolf in the lair". Richard Galliano plays again the accordion.
- Le mani e l’anima - The songs is dedicated to the drama of whom leaves his mainland in order to find a redemption in another country, describing in particular the African roots of men, with parallelism between body parts and natural elements typical of the African environment. The lyric self wants back his hands and soul, his "African soul" (Africanima) and his body by synecdoche, because Africa is the soul of the whole world. At the end, Italian pejorative way mocking the stereotypical accent of African peddlers is used to spell phrases of resignation (like Che vù campà, Che vù parlà and Che vù tornà) overcome by African rhythm, meaning that Africans has to claim the right to be not considered as inferior or culturally underdeveloped and the right to consider Africa as mother and soul of the entire world. Instrumental track was composed in the Real World Studios, while voices were recorded in Rome. Senegalese songwriter and mbalax pioneer Youssou N'Dour took part to the choirs:
  I had met Claudio in Italy, but I can't remember who had presented him to me. We played in the recording studio all night, in Rome, and he had gave me the complete freedom in the interpretation of his song. I had only tried to follow the melody and to give my contribute. I've a very positive memory of him, who is also musically very prepared.
  — Youssou N'Dour, during a brief interview with Caggiani in Warsaw on 13 September 2009
- Mille giorni di te e di me - The story of an ended love story lasted about three years, when each one goes towards those who will teach what they have learned together, dreaming of that "moment of eternal" which has never been realized between the lovers. Causes of split up are initially not clearly revealed, but the lyric self considered love as a shelter from the world and he tries to imagine a new relationship which would however had scars of the one ended. With the final salute to the former girlfriend, the lyric self delivers the memory of himself to who would be his substitute. In an interview with Italian journalist Vincenzo Mollica, Baglioni said:

It is a song which is born from the idea that love, the true one, sometimes originates when the love ends. It is a song which in his final phase became more complete and just originated because I think that a man, when he meets a woman and truly falls in love for her, tries to hide himself from her and then to hide her – so her casing – from the world's eyes. I think that it is the moment when a men really falls in love. [...] Basically the whole song is autobiographical, but with such taste of autobiography that artists have in put together different biographies, that is to create a web through which is mysterious to enter. There a verse, in particular, which says: “The one, who'll be after you, will smell your scent thinking that is mine" [Chi ci sarà dopo di te respirerà il tuo odore pensando che sia il mio]”. And this is a verse of which I'm particularly fond, because I think that memory has a scent, absence of people is still measured by their scent.

— Claudio Baglioni

Side B

- Dov’è dov’è - After an introduction of Italian actor Oreste Lionello who describes the moral decline of society, Baglioni compares himself with the child he was, when he ran from attentions of his relatives, and the grown-up himself who runs away from Paparazzi, fans, family and the world. Everyone is desperately looking for him like in a search of a fugitive criminal. It features actual voices of parents, former teachers and his wife, telling in choirs the character of the child Baglioni. At the end, the "criminal" is caught and took to process and events of his private life become a sort of accusation by meddlesome people.
- Tieniamente - It is dedicated to the events of 1989 Tiananmen Square protests and the title is a pun between "Tienanmen" and Tieni a mente ("Keep in mind"), appealing to not forget what happened.
- Qui Dio non c’è - The song depicts the rage and suffering (both personal and collective) provoked by all wrong and evil things in the world, where maybe there is not any God despite He should have realized himself in nature.
- La piana dei cavalli bradi - The song begins with a natural atmosphere of horses running freely on plains, and then lyrics describes the distance between two lovers: probably, it refers to the two-years retirement of Baglioni in Ansedonia to compose music for the album, isolating himself from everyone. The lyric self accepts and waits its future, like horses in stables waiting to run. Finally, man could find his inner peace in that waiting and he begins to run towards "the plain of wild horses". In an interview for Rai Radio 2, Baglioni declared that he was inspired by the Plateaus of Castelluccio, in Umbria:
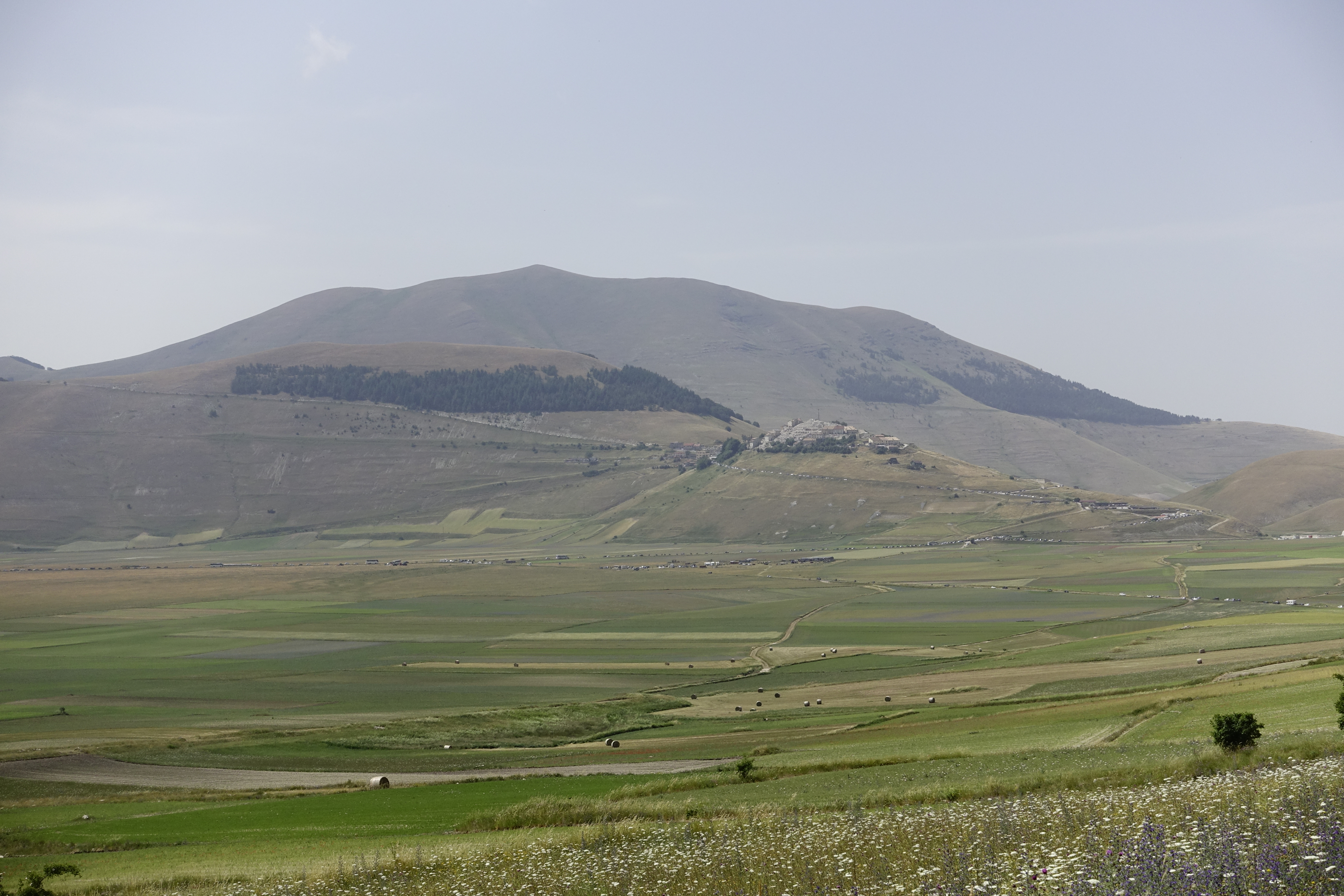
  Plateaus of Castelluccio

I've always carried Umbria in my heart and eyes, up to Castelluccio. Castelluccio is a small town above Norcia and which I know since 1971; Franco Zeffirelli made me know it, on occasion of one of my first singins, of my first performances. I was the [Italian] singing voice of Francis of Assisi in the film Brother Sun, Sister Moon, just directed by Franco Zeffirelli, and since that year, loving in particular that place, I've begun a pilgrimage, practically almost every year, and I've even started to took inspiration for a song called La piana dei cavalli bradi. And I've begun to think about the fact that we are all a bit waiting, like horses in stables, and men and horses look alike after all, and the horse like the man tries to subdue itself, because it feels that there's something to which it can't say no. The horse has an incredible strength, but it decides in a certain moment to let stuff go, a bit like the man does. And the horse's eye, a bit like the man's mind, contains some sparks of craziness and restlessness. [...] I've imagined in this song that men are horses, both similar for their ability to wait and their incredible strength - which can be bended only with a reason – and just in this final when you begin to run until you fly: after all, this would be the dream of all people.

— Claudio Baglioni, Mezzogiorno con..., Rai Radio 2, 19 May 1998

- Pace - In the final song of the album, the author makes pace with himself, his child self and with all the world: he is now an adult and he has find by himself that heart in this world so similar to human beings, under a sky tricking us like a magician. After saluting Cucaio, the lyric self declares to have become free, a "Beyond-Man" similar to the Nietzschean Übermensch.

This album doesn't do a balance, on the contrary it is a disc without answers at the end, because as we wanted – I, together with other people – represent it also graphically, the essence of the disc is a long wave, and a wave doesn't find again itself, it can never rejoin itself from the opposite part, from the final one. So, it's a way to continue, to exist in a continuous metamorphosis, hoping sometimes to have answers, but answers are a true miracle. Anyway, the most important thing is to ask yourself what's happening. And I thing that the disc, in its musical texture but also in its – let's say – literary texture, can reflect that. It's a disc without a true final answer but a disc with many questions.

— Claudio Baglioni, Maurizio Costanzo Show, 15 November 1990

== Release ==
In October 1990, the second stereophonic radio station of RAI, RaiStereoDue, aired the first two tracks of the album one month before the official release.

On the night of 4 November 1990, a few days before the presentation of the new album, Baglioni was involved in a car accident on a rainy night when his Porsche crashed on Via della Camilluccia, on the outskirts of Rome, against Villa Fendi, just a few meters from the artist’s residence in the Monte Mario district. He was rushed to the Quisisana Clinic, where medical reports stated that the singer-songwriter had suffered serious injuries to his hands and face, as well as an approximately eight-centimeter cut to his tongue. In the days immediately following, the deep cut to the tongue was further reduced through laser surgery, while the facial injuries were treated using new plastic surgery techniques. Medical bulletins specified that the surgical procedures would not force the singer-songwriter to interrupt his career. After being discharged from the clinic, on 15 November Baglioni appeared as the sole guest on an episode of the Maurizio Costanzo Show on Canale 5, marking his first public appearance after the accident. Still visibly shaken and noticeably thinner, he nevertheless performed at the piano with a vocal performance accompanied by the chorus of the Teatro Parioli audience.

On 29 December 1990, Claudio Baglioni appeared on the television program Fantastico, connecting from his villa in Ansedonia. On that occasion, together with his band, he performed the first song from the new album: the atmosphere was almost surprising, resembling a rehearsal filmed in the basement of his home. The presentation was intentionally simple and lighter compared to the solemnity the public was accustomed to.

During the broadcast he also announced the official presentation of the album, scheduled for 5 January 1991.

On that date, Baglioni appeared on a stage dominated by a large backdrop reproducing the cover of Oltre and performed three songs from the album, symbolically marking the work’s entrance into the new decade.

On 17 November 1990, three years after its announcement, the album of new material was released in Italy under the title Oltre – un mondo uomo sotto un cielo mago. The record immediately reached the number one position on the charts, supported by half a million copies sold in pre-orders, an extraordinary figure for the time that reflected the almost feverish anticipation surrounding its release.

In February 1991, CBS declared that the album sold more than 900 000 copies in Italy. It sold more than 6 million copies in the world.

In 1991, a version of Oltre was released in several countries, including Spain, Canada, Germany, France, Japan, and across North and South America. Oltre remains the only Claudio Baglioni album released worldwide.

== Reception ==
Oltre surprised Italian music critics and journalists. In a review for TV Sorrisi e Canzoni, composer Ennio Morricone wrote:

Here it is a songwriter [Baglioni] which has never standardize himself. He has always been coherent, never enslaved by "vices" which falsify the eventual originality that a good song must have.

— Ennio Morricone

Critic Gino Castaldo wrote on La Repubblica:

We should begin to took seriously mister Claudio Baglioni, songwriter by profession. [...] And let's say straightly that we are at the top levels of musical production [...] Magniloquence is evident, but after all it is a typical characteristic of Baglioni, who has done often excessive undertakings and it has to be seen in the context of this weird songwriter history, absolutely unique and all based on an inextinguishable desire for intellectual redemption that he has cultivated since when he was the biggest writer of songs for teenagers in love. [...] This time, ambition is truly unbridled, it is the one of the great allegory reuniting the sense of life, and here it is really hard to follow the speech, moreover supported by an outstanding musical work. [...] If Baglioni demonstrates to be a poet, it is just in some beautiful melodic intuitions, where his talent shines without any ambiguity. And there is more in those crumbs of notes than in all the unrealistic literary saga on which the disc is pivoted.

— Gino Castaldo, La Repubblica

== Track listing ==
Disc 1

All tracks are written by Claudio Baglioni.

No.	Title	Length
1.	"Dagli il via"	5:46
2.	"Io dal mare (featuring Pino Daniele)"	5:28
3.	"Naso di falco"	5:16
4.	"Io lui e la cana femmina"	4:16
5.	"Stelle di stelle (featuring Mia Martini)"	3:23
6.	"Vivi"	4:21
7.	"Le donne sono"	4:40
8.	"Domani mai (featuring Paco de Lucía)"	5:09
9.	"Acqua dalla luna"	4:31
10.	"Tamburi lontani"	5:49

Disc 2

All tracks are written by Claudio Baglioni.

No.	Title	Length
1.	"Noi no"	5:14
2.	"Signora delle ore scure"	4:50
3.	"Navigando"	4:03
4.	"Le mani e l'anima (featuring Youssou N'Dour)"	5:22
5.	"Mille giorni di te e di me"	5:38
6.	"Dov'è dov'è (featuring Oreste Lionello)"	4:55
7.	"Tieniamente"	3:44
8.	"Qui Dio non c'è"	5:38
9.	"La piana dei cavalli bradi"	4:56
10.	"Pace"	5:41

== Personnel ==
Credits from the booklet.

=== Dagli il via ===
- Simon Clark – piano
- Celso Valli – keyboards
- Phil Palmer – guitar
- David Rhodes – guitar
- Pino Palladino – bass
- Manu Katché – drums

=== Io dal mare (feat. Pino Daniele) ===
- Pino Daniele – guitar, backing vocals
- Paolo Gianolio – guitars
- David Sancious – keyboard
- Pino Palladino – bass
- Manu Katché – drums

=== Naso di falco ===
- Paolo Gianolio – guitars
- Frank Ricotti – percussion
- Marcello Bono – hurdy-gurdy
- Celso Valli – keyboards
- Pino Palladino – bass
- Manu Katché – drums

=== Io lui e la cana femmina (feat. Richard Galliano) ===
- Paolo Gianolio – guitar
- Celso Valli – keyboards
- Manu Katché – drums
- Richard Galliano – accordion
- Pierre Dutour – trumpet
- Michael Gaucher – saxophone

=== Stelle di stelle (feat. Mia Martini) ===
- Mia Martini – vocals
- Danilo Rea – piano
- Pino Palladino – bass
- Manu Katché – drums, percussion

=== Vivi ===
- Celso Valli – keyboards
- Nick Glennie-Smith – keyboards
- Phil Palmer – guitars
- Manu Katché – drums

=== Le donne sono ===
- Paolo Gianolio – guitars
- Danny Cummings – percussion
- Pino Palladino – bass
- Manu Katché – drums
- Ida Baldi, Rossella Corsi, Cesare De Natale, Susan Duncan-Smith, Roberta Longhi, Livio Macoratti, Paola Massari, Claudio Mattone, Matteo Montanari, Piero Montanari, Franco Novaro, Massimiliano Savaiano – choir

=== Domani mai (feat. Paco de Lucía) ===
- Paco de Lucía – guitar
- Paolo Gianolio – guitar
- Pino Palladino – bass
- Celso Valli – keyboards
- Manu Katché – drums
- Unione dei Musicisti di Roma – strings and mandolins, conducted by Celso Valli

=== Acqua dalla luna ===
- Celso Valli – keyboards
- Tony Levin – bass
- Steve Ferrone – drums

=== Tamburi lontani ===
- Danny Cummings – percussion
- Danny Thompson – double bass
- Manu Katché – drums
- Isobel Griffiths – brass and woodwinds, conducted by Celso Valli

=== Noi no ===
- Paolo Gianolio – guitars
- Celso Valli – keyboards
- Frank Ricotti – percussion
- Pino Palladino – bass
- Manu Katché – drums

=== Signora delle ore scure ===
- Paolo Gianolio – guitars
- Celso Valli – keyboards
- Tony Levin – bass
- Manu Katché – drums

=== Navigando (feat. Richard Galliano) ===
- Nick Glennie-Smith – keyboards
- Celso Valli – keyboards
- Tony Levin – bass
- Steve Ferrone – drums
- Hossam Ramzy – percussion
- Richard Galliano – accordion

=== Le mani e l’anima (feat. Youssou N'Dour) ===
- Youssou N'Dour – vocals
- John Giblin – bass
- Nick Glennie-Smith – keyboards
- Celso Valli – keyboards
- Danny Cummings – percussion
- Charlie Morgan – drums

=== Mille giorni di te e di me ===
- Paolo Gianolio – guitar
- Walter Savelli – piano
- Celso Valli – keyboards
- Tony Levin – bass
- Steve Ferrone – drums

=== Dov’è dov’è (feat. Oreste Lionello) ===
- Oreste Lionello – spoken voice
- Paolo Gianolio – guitar
- Phil Palmer – guitar
- Celso Valli – keyboards, programming
- Manu Katché – drums
- Riccardo Baglioni, Silvia Saleppico, Teresita Lastoria, Mario Pescetelli – vocals

=== Tieniamente ===
- Claudio Baglioni – piano
- Celso Valli – sound programming

=== Qui Dio non c’è (feat. Didier Lockwood) ===
- Didier Lockwood – violin
- Paolo Gianolio – guitar
- Pino Palladino – bass
- Celso Valli – keyboards
- Hossam Ramzy – percussion
- Frank Ricotti – percussion
- Manu Katché – drums
- London Symphony Orchestra – brass, conducted by Celso Valli
- Unione Musicisti Roma – flutes, conducted by Celso Valli

=== La piana dei cavalli bradi ===
- Paolo Gianolio – guitar
- Pino Palladino – bass
- Celso Valli – keyboards
- Danny Cummings – percussion
- Manu Katché – drums
- Unione Musicisti Roma – string orchestra, conducted by Celso Valli

=== Pace ===
- Paolo Gianolio – guitars
- Celso Valli – keyboards, programming
- Frank Ricotti – percussion
- Pino Palladino – bass
- Manu Katché – drums

== Production ==
- Claudio Baglioni – conceived, written and performed
- Celso Valli – arrangements, conductor
- Pasquale Minieri – production supervision
- Susan Duncan-Smith, Roberta Longhi, Paola Massari, Walter Savelli – production assistance

=== Recording ===
- Stuart Bruce
- Mark Chamberlain
- Claude Grilles
- Maurizio Maggi
- Paul Mortimer
- Eddie Offord

=== Mixing ===
- Graham Dickson
- Pasquale Minieri

=== Mastering ===
- Tim Young

=== Artwork ===
- Venezia Projects – cover project and artwork
- Guido Harari – photography
- Vittorio Venezia – graphic design

=== Studios ===
- Real World Studios Bath Westside – London
- Town House – London
- Grande Armée – Paris
- Forum – Rome
- Pick Up – Reggio Emilia
- Studio Emme – Florence
- Easy Records – Rome
- Heaven – Rimini
- Great Linford – Milton Keynes

=== Publishing ===
- Cosa Edizioni – Rome

== See also ==
- Claudio Baglioni
- World music

== Bibliography ==
- Caggiani, Filippo Maria (2010). Oltre Storia e analisi del capolavoro di Claudio Baglioni (PDF). Lulu.com. ISBN 978-1-4467-4308-9.
