= Guarani languages =

Language group

Guarani
- Tupi–Guarani subgroup I
- Geographic distribution: Argentina, Bolivia, Brazil, Paraguay
- Linguistic classification: Tupian: Tupi–Guarani; Guarani
- Subdivisions: Paraguayan; Western Bolivian; Eastern Bolivian; Chiripá; Mbyá; Kaiwá; Aché; Xeta; Classical †

Language codes
- ISO 639-3: grn
- Glottolog: tupi1277
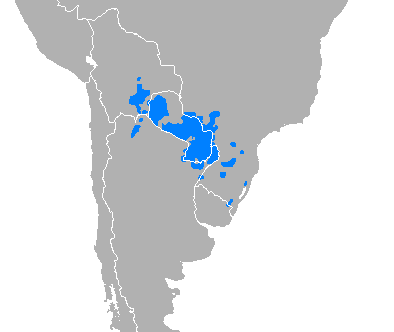
- Guarani-speaking world

The Guarani languages are a group of half a dozen or so languages in the Tupi–Guarani language family. The best known language in this family is Paraguayan Guarani, one of the national languages of Paraguay, alongside Spanish.

== Classification ==
The Guarani languages are:

- Guarani dialect chain: Western Bolivian Guarani (Simba), Eastern Bolivian Guarani (Chawuncu; Ava, Tapieté dialects), Paraguayan Guaraní (Guarani), Correntine Guarani (Taragui), Chiripá Guaraní (Nhandéva, Avá), Mbyá Guaraní (Mbya)
  - Western Bolivian Guarani (a.k.a. Simba), 7,000 speakers
  - Eastern Bolivian Guarani (a.k.a. Chiriguano, Chawuncu, Western Argentine Guarani), 55,000 speakers
    - dialects: Avá (subdialects Chané, Tapieté a.k.a. Ñandeva), Izoceño/Izocenio
  - Paraguayan Guarani (Guarani proper), 5 million mostly mestizo speakers
  - Correntine Guarani (Guarani correntino, Taragui/Taragüí), 100,000 speakers, mostly mestizos and criollo people
  - Chiripá Guarani (a.k.a. Avá, Nhandéva/Ñandeva, Apytare, Tsiripá/Txiripá), 12,000 speakers
  - Mbyá Guarani (Mbya), 25,000 speakers
- Kaiwá (Paí Tavyterá dialect)
- Aché (Guayaki) (several dialects)
- ? Xetá
- Classical Guarani

The varieties of Guarani proper and Kaiwá have limited mutual intelligibility. Aché and Guarani are not mutually intelligible. The position of Xetá is unclear.

These share some degree of mutual intelligibility and are close to being dialects; however, Chiripá is reported to be intelligible due to bilingualism, not inherently. Also, there is a degree of intelligibility with Kaiwá–Pai Tavytera, which is not included in the Ethnologue. Ethnologue considers Tapieté to be a separate language, intermediate between Eastern Bolivian and Paraguayan, and has shifted from the name Chiripá to Avá, though the latter is ambiguous. Paraguayan Guarani is by far the most widely spoken variety and is what is often meant by the term "Guarani" outside South America.

== Documentation ==
The Guaraní language has been an object of study since the arrival of the Jesuits in the seventeenth century. The differences among the three dialects of the Guaraní language can be noted primarily in their distinct phonologies and syntax, as these vary depending on the social context that the language is being used. Of note, the Mbyá prioritize oral transmission. Literacy within the Mbyá received an increased level of importance in the late 1990s as a product of new educational institutions in the villages. Lemle (1971) contends that in spite of there being almost forty dialects within the Tupí-Guaraní family, there exist numerous similarities between the words of these dialects.

== Literature ==
The Tupí-Guaraní branch within the Tupí family that has been the object of most linguistic studies within this family. As a result, the linguistic literature available on Tupí-Guaraní languages is extensive, ranging from grammars, bibliographies, histories of language development, typological studies, to dissertations on the phonology of the Guaraní language.

As efforts move forward to standardize Guaraní, the expansion of its use across sectors in Latin America will only increase. This can be seen with the broad expanse of literature being developed on the structure of Guaraní language, as well as its cultural importance. One of the key proponents in this venture, other than the Guaraní themselves, is academic Robert A. Dooley. Dooley has made an extensive collection of works of the language through his career, usually based around the discourse of the Guaraní-Mbyá language structure. Examples being on how different grammatical structures are understood by the speaker, can completely shift the narrative being shared, or the focus on the pragmatic structuring of Guaraní sentences, clause chaining, or spatial understandings of Guaraní. These research projects done by Dooley are crucial to understanding different cultural aspects, like discourses in relation to translating important religious factors which in turn are important for empowering the Guaraní themselves. This standardization is also supported by academics like Guillaume Thomas, who through examining Guaraní can differentiate between temporal suffixes and as such different tenses, and who through examining differing degrees of nominalization, is able to compare different variants of Guaraní-Mbyá between Argentina, Brazil, and Paraguay, in turn creating a type of database of difference that can be used for reference for the different language styles. Works such as these, and the work of scholars like Estigarribia and Pinta (2017) that compiles recent studies on the Guaraní will become of increasing relevance.

== Geographical distribution ==
=== Paraguay ===
Paraguayan Guarani, is, alongside Spanish, one of the official languages of Paraguay. Paraguay's constitution is bilingual, and its state-produced textbooks are typically half in Spanish and half in Guarani.

A variety of Guarani known as Chiripá is also spoken in Paraguay. It is closely related to Paraguayan Guarani, a language which speakers are increasingly switching to. There are 7,000 speakers of Chiripá in Paraguay.

Additionally, another variety of Guarani known as Mbyá is also spoken in Paraguay by 8,000 speakers. Lexically, it is 75% similar to Paraguayan Guarani.

The smallest Guarani speaking community in Paraguay is that of the Aché, also known as Guayaki, with a population of 850.

Finally, in the Paraguayan Chaco Department, there are 304 speakers of Eastern Bolivian/Western Argentine Guarani, known locally as Ñandeva or Tapiete. (However, outside Paraguay, Ñandeva refers to Chiripá.)

The largest Guarani group in the Chaco is that known locally as Guarayo who settled in Paraguay after the war with Bolivia (1932–35). They are originally from the Isoso area of Bolivia.

=== Argentina ===
In Argentina, Correntine Guarani is the official linguistic variety in the Corrientes Province, along with Spanish. It is the most intelligible variety of Paraguayan Guarani, being considered two diatopic varieties of the same language.

A different variety of Guarani, Western Argentine Guarani, is spoken further west by about 15,000 speakers, mostly in Jujuy, but also in Salta Province. It refers essentially to the same variety of Guarani as Eastern Bolivian Guarani.

Additionally, another variety of Guarani known as Mbyá is spoken in Argentina by 3,000 speakers.

=== Bolivia ===
Eastern Bolivian Guarani and Western Bolivian Guarani are widely spoken in the southeastern provinces of the country.

Eastern Bolivian Guarani, also known as Chawuncu or Chiriguano, is spoken in by 33,670 speakers (or 36,917) in the south-central Parapeti River area and in the city of Tarija. It refers to essentially the same variety of Guarani as Western Argentine Guarani.

Other Guarani groups that exist are the Gwarayú or Guarayos around 30,000, and Sirionó some 800 in Santa Cruz. What remains of the Yuki population estimated at around 240 live in the Dpt. of Cochabamba.

In August 2009 Bolivia launched a Guarani-language university at Kuruyuki in the southeastern province of Chuquisaca which will bear the name of indigenous hero Apiaguaiki Tumpa.

=== Brazil ===
The expansive territory of the Guaraní encompasses a space that traverses the Brazilian, Paraguayan, Argentine and Uruguayan borders. There are various points of tension in the history of the Guaraní, but this analysis will prioritize three: (i) the arrival of the Jesuits; (ii) the exploitative labour practices of the encomiendas; and finally, (iii) the expropriation of Guaraní land by the Spanish and Portuguese colonizers.

== Phonology ==
Guarani Consonants
	Bilabial	Labio- dental	Dental	Alveolar	Post-alv./ Palatal	Velar	Glottal
Nasal/ Prenasalized	(m), ᵐb		ⁿd	(n)	(ɲ), ᶮdʒ	(ŋ), ᵑɡ	
Plosive	p		t		c	k ɡ	ʔ
Fricative	β	v		s	ʃ	x	(h)
Rhotic				r, ɾ			
Approximant		ʋ			j	ɰ	
Lateral					l		

Note. Data in chart above retrieved from A. Gutman, B. Avanzati, and R. Dooley.

Guarani Vowels
	Front	Central	Back
High	i ĩ	ɨ ɨ̃	u ũ
Mid	e ẽ		o õ
Low		a ã	

Note. Chart above reprinted from A. Gutman and B. Avanzati.

== See also ==
- WikiProject Guaraní (in Spanish)
