= GNW =

GNW may refer to:

- Genworth Financial, an international financial services organization
- Good News Week, an Australian television program
- Greenwich station, in London
- Gross National Well-being or Gross National Wellness
- Hansa-Brandenburg GNW, a floatplane
- Western Bolivian Guarani, a language of Bolivia
