= Ava Guarani =

Ava Guarani may refer to

- the Ava Guarani people
- the Ava Guarani language
