= Pai Tavytera language =

Guarani language spoken in Paraguay

Pãi Tavyterã
- Ava, Pãi, Tavyterã
- Native to: Paraguay
- Ethnicity: 8,030 Pai Tavytera people (2007)
- Native speakers: 600 (2007)
- Language family: Tupian: Tupí–Guaraní; Guaraní (I); Kaiwá; Pãi Tavyterã
- Writing system: Latin

Language codes
- ISO 639-3: pta
- Glottolog: pait1247

Pãi Tavyterã is a Guarani language spoken by about 600 Pai Tavytera people in eastern Paraguay, in Amambay, eastern Concepción, eastern San Pedro, and northern Canindeyú Departments. The language has 70% lexical similarity with the Kaiwá language, spoken in Brazil. Among Pai Tavyetera people, language use is shifting towards Guaraní.

The language is written in the Latin script.

== Phonology ==
=== Vowels ===
	Front		Central		Back	
	oral	nasal	oral	nasal	oral	nasal
Close	i	ĩ	ɨ	ɨ̃	u	ũ
Mid	e	ẽ			o	õ
Open			a	ã		

- Six shortened vowels both oral and nasal are heard as /ĭ ɨ̆ ŭ/ and /ĩ̆ ɨ̃̆ ũ̆/.

=== Consonants ===
		Labial	Alveolar	Post- alveolar	Palatal	Velar	Glottal
Nasal		m	n		ɲ	(ŋ)	
Plosive	voiceless	p	t			k	ʔ
Plosive	voiced	b	d			ɡ	
Fricative			s	ʃ	ʝ		h
Approximant		ʋ	l			w	
Tap			ɾ				

- /ʝ/ may also be realized as an affricate [ɟʝ].
- /b d ʝ ɡ/ may be prenasalized [ᵐb ⁿd ᶮʝ ᵑɡ].
- /n/ is realized as [ŋ] before velar consonants.

== Bibliography ==
- Escobar-Imlach, Celeste Mariana (2017). Aspectos fónicos, fonológicos y morfofonológicos del pai tavytera guaraní. México: Centro de Investigaciones y Estudios Superiores en Antropología Social.
