= Claudio Baglioni =

Italian pop musician

Claudio Baglioni OMRI
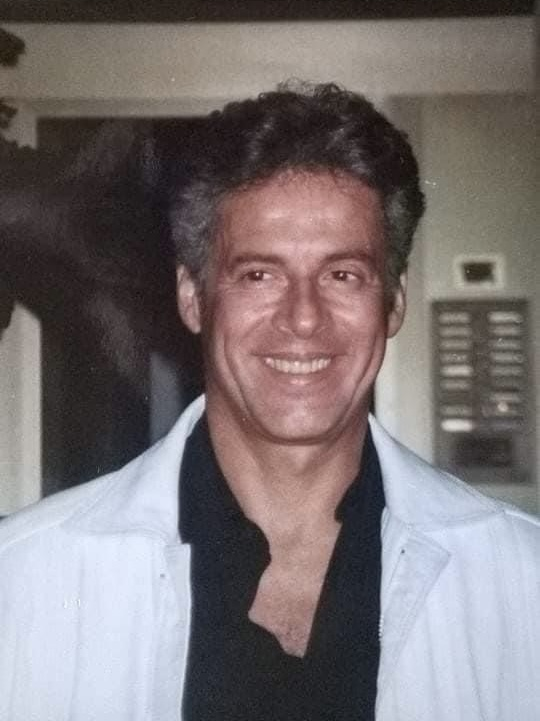

Background information
- Born: 16 May 1951 (age 75)
- Origin: Rome, Italy
- Genres: Pop; pop rock; adult contemporary music; rock; world music
- Occupations: Singer; songwriter; musician; record producer
- Years active: 1968–present
- Labels: RCA Italiana; CBS; Sony Music
- Website: Claudio Baglioni official website
- Height: 1.85 m (6 ft 1 in)

Claudio Baglioni OMRI (Italian pronunciation: [ˈklaudjo baʎˈʎoːni]; born 16 May 1951) is an Italian pop singer-songwriter and musician. His career has been going on for over 50 years.

Considered one of the most successful pop rock singer-songwriters in the history of Italian music, he has sold over 60 million records, including Questo piccolo grande amore from 1972, its title track later being awarded "song of the century", Strada facendo from 1981, and La vita è adesso from 1985 which is the best-selling album of all time in Italy.

In the 1990's he experimented with world music with the time trilogy, which began with Oltre (1990), widely considered his masterpiece, continued with one of the best-selling albums ever in Italy Io sono qui (1995) and ended with Viaggiatore sulla coda del tempo (1999). In 2006 he composed the anthem of the 2006 Winter Olympics.

Also an innovator in the field of live performances, Baglioni achieved over a million total spectators with the tours Alé Oó in 1982 and Notti di note in 1985. In 1986 he invented a new method of live performance, with the tour Assolo where he performed completely alone accompanied by electric guitar, piano, sequencer and MIDI, a technology never tested at the time.

In 1991 he was the first artist in the world to realize a concert with the stage in the centre, awarded by the magazine Billboard as "the best concert in the world", on 6 June 1998, again with the same concept of the stage in the centre, he performed in front of 100,000 spectators at the Olympic stadium in Rome, in 2000 he performed on St. Peter's Square in the Vatican City in the presence of 300,000 people including the Pope. In 2006 he was officially the first Italian artist to perform at the Brussels European Parliament.

== Biography ==
Around 1968 he composed the Annabel Lee musical suite, based on a poem by Edgar Allan Poe. In 1969, he released his first single and recorded the single Signora Lia; a comic song that tells of a lady's marital infidelity. Over time the song became a cult song of Italian pop music despite its poor initial success. He collaborated with Italian singer Mia Martini for her debut album.

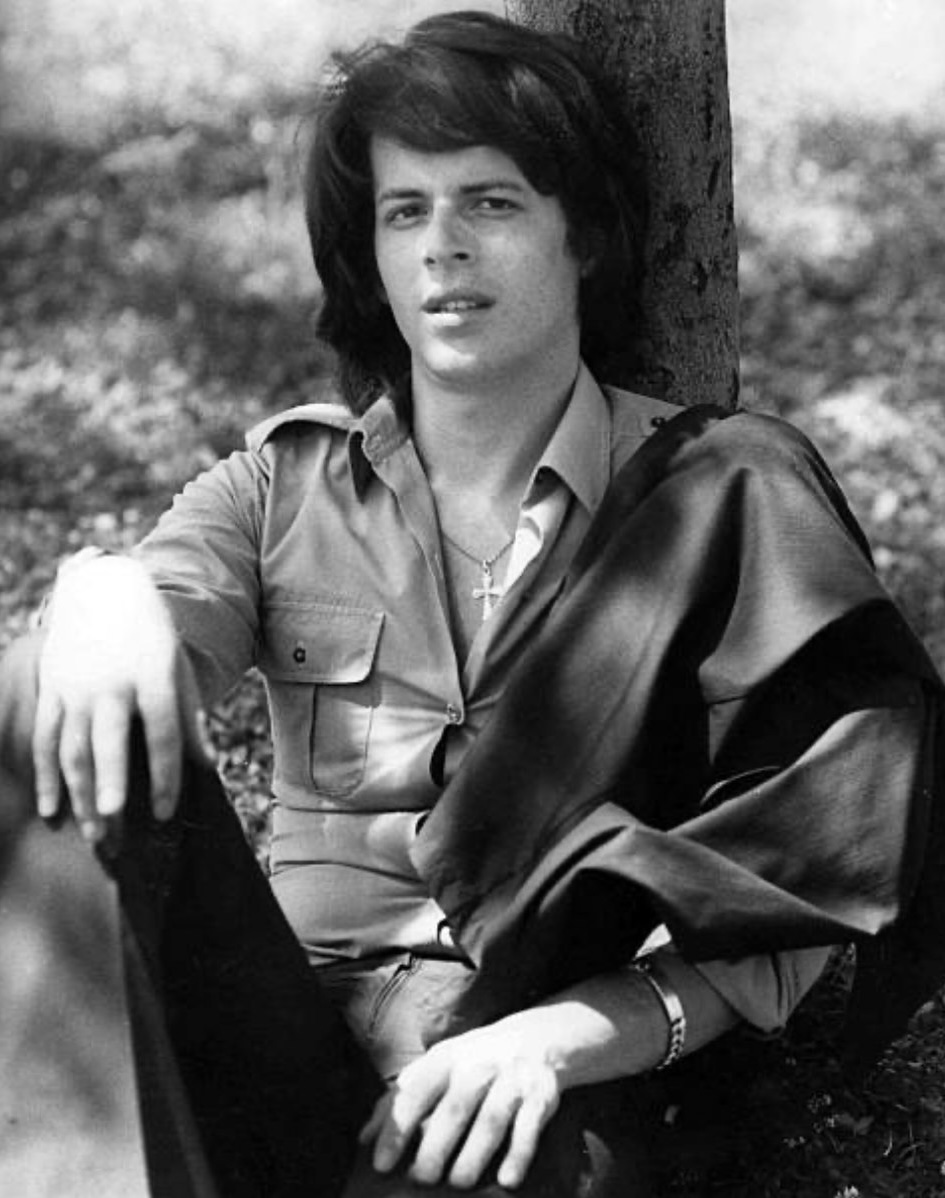
Baglioni in 1974

Success came only in 1972, with the album Questo piccolo grande amore; the title track was awarded as the Italian song of the century in 1985. In 1974, he recorded the album E tu ... with Vangelis. In 1975, it comes out Sabato pomeriggio; a concept album about waiting, based on Giacomo Leopardi's poems. In 1977, the album Solo; was the first in which he made lyrics, music and production on his own. In 1978, Baglioni released the album E tu come stai?.

In 1981, he produced the hugely successful album Strada facendo the first Italian album to reach one million copies. The following year the Alé Oó tour starts, the first tour of an Italian singer in large stadiums. The name of the tour in fact takes its cue from a typical chorus of football matches. In June of the same year (1982) Baglioni at the age of 31 became a father and in one day wrote the worldwide hit song Avrai dedicated to his son.

In 1985, Baglioni released the album La vita è adesso, the best-selling album of all time in Italy with almost 4 million copies sold, immediately after the release of the album, Baglioni embarked on the 1985 stadium tour which totalled over 1.5 million spectators with the final concert in Rome, which was the first concert in the history of Italian music to be broadcast live on TV.

The overwhelming success of the album called for another big tour the following year; Assolo a sensational tour consisting of over 30 concerts in major stadiums across Italy where Claudio Baglioni performs completely alone, without a band, with the help of classical and electric guitar, pianola, piano, synthesizer and MIDI, a technology never tested at the time. The live album Assolo was recorded in Milan and became a commercial success in Europe. The success of Claudio in this decade was so high that around the end of 1985 the first collection for the European market was released, entitled Claudio Baglioni, containing ten of Baglioni's songs from the decade so far.

In 1988, he participated in a concert of the Human Right Now! tour with Peter Gabriel, Sting and Bruce Springsteen.

In 1990, after 3 years of work he released the double album Oltre, an ambitious project with 20 songs that contains experiments with world music. The concert of 1991 was reviewed positively by Billboard magazine as the best concert of the year in the world, thanks to the stage that is located in the center of the stadium with the public surrounding it in the round. In the same year the European version of the record Oltre is marketed. In 1992 the tour Oltre il concerto began, held in indoor arenas with the stage in the centre, marking the return of Baglioni throughout Italy, with over 50 dates it was a huge success. In 1995, the album Io sono qui was released, which marks Claudio's return to the scene, the album deals with the theme of comedy, everyday life is in fact a bit of a comedy for everyone where everyone wears a mask without knowing if he is an actor or a spectator of life. The album is structured as if it were a film with a beginning, an end, the interlude and then the first, second, third and fourth time which anticipate the subsequent songs by describing them as cinematic scenes. The album has sold 1.5 million copies to date. Baglioni initially presents the album with a series of surprise concerts held on a yellow truck which once opened became a stage, the concert tour is called Tour Giallo. Subsequently, the 1996 tour called Tour Rosso began in arenas with the stage in the center without barriers between the public and the artist with the band, with over 51 dates it became an incredible success. On 6 June 1998, he held the concert event of the year at the Olympic stadium in Rome, the concert totaled over 100,000 spectators thanks to the stage in the center and the spectators who filled the stadium, still this record remains undefeated by any event.

In the summer of 1998 he performed a one-hour concert on the ship Amerigo Vespucci at the port of Lisbon for Expo 1998.

And in 1999, the album Viaggiatore sulla coda del tempo, with the imminent arrival of the new millennium, considered one of the most ambitious, complex and cultured projects of Baglioni's entire recording work, it marks the passage of the millennium through a traveler's journey between space and time. The album sells half a million copies in a month. Baglioni subsequently declared that the three albums (Oltre, Io sono qui and Viaggiatore sulla coda del tempo) make up a trilogy of time where each represents the past, present and future respectively. The tour that followed this album took place between January and March 2000, called Tour Blu, it is characterized by a futuristic cut like the 1999 album with projection screens and laser lights, the concerts began with a sort of three-dimensional hologram that had the appearance of a robotic face named Claud; an alter ego of the artist who announced that he came from the future and appeared between one song and another to tell his story accompanied by thoughts and messages from the future, the virtual image mentions that as long as his music is listened to the traveler will not he will have left in vain. On 31 December 1999, for New Year's Eve, he performed in the last concert of the millennium in St. Peter’s Square, in the Vatican, in the presence of approximately 380,000 spectators including the Pope and on live national TV, he is the first and only artist in history to have held a concert in Vatican Square.

In the summer of 2000, he brought the tour Acustico. Sogno di una notte di note to amphitheatres, rearranging all his most famous songs in an acoustic key, in 2001 he was the first artist to bring pop music to traditional theaters with the tour Incanto tra pianoforte e voce performing completely alone accompanied by just the piano.

In 2003 the album Sono io was released which sold 300,000 copies in just one month, followed by a stadium tour with the stage at the center. In 2005 his first official greatest hits album Tutti qui was released, and was accompanied by a tour which lasted from 2006 to 2007, beginning in arenas.

In 2009 he launched the ambitious Q.P.G.A. project which includes a novel, an album, a film and a series of concerts.

In 2010, he did a series of concerts around the world, the last concert at the Royal Albert Hall in London was recorded and broadcast on Sky and transposed onto the live album World Tour which was met with incredible success. On New Year's Eve 2011 he held a concert at the Imperial fora in Rome which attracted over 300,000 people. In 2013 he released the album Con voi.

In 2019, to celebrate 50 years of career, he held an concert at the Verona Arena which for the first time is open to the public in its entirety, with the stage in the center and the spectators filling the entire arena in the round.

In 2020 the album In questa storia, che è la mia was released. In the summer of 2022, he embarked on the Tutti su! tour of amphitheaters and in the summer of 2023 aTuttoCuore tour with a concert at the Foro Italico in Rome, continuing in 2024 around Italy in indoor arenas and in the Arena of Verona with eight stages in September 2024.

In 2025, the 40th anniversary edition of the album La vita è adesso, the best-selling album of all time in Italy, will be released, and in 2026, the Grand Tour of Italy's best outdoor spaces will begin.

== Discography ==
Year	Title	Sales	Certifications
1970	Claudio Baglioni		
1971	Un cantastorie dei giorni nostri		
1972	Questo piccolo grande amore	ITA: 1,500,000	
1973	Gira che ti rigira amore bello		
1974	E tu...	ITA: 500,000	
1975	Sabato pomeriggio		
1977	Solo		
1978	E tu come stai?		AFI: Platinum
1981	Strada facendo	ITA: 1,850,000	AFI: Platinum
1985	La vita è adesso	ITA: 4,500,000	
1990	Oltre	ITA: 800,000	
1995	Io sono qui	ITA: 1,500,000	
1999	Viaggiatore sulla coda del tempo	ITA: 600,000	
2003	Sono io	ITA: 230,000	
2009	Q.P.G.A.	ITA: 100,000	FIMI: 2× Platinum
2013	Convoi		FIMI: Platinum
2020	In questa storia, che è la mia	ITA: 50,000	FIMI: Platinum

=== Live albums ===
Year	Title	Sales	Certifications
1982	Alé Oó	ITA: 1,000,000	
1986	Assolo		
1992	Assieme	ITA: 1,500,000 (combined sales with Alé O)	
1996	Attori e spettatori		
2000	Acustico. Sogno di una notte di note		
2004	Crescendo e cercando	ITA: 165,000	
2010	World tour 2010		FIMI: Gold
2019	Da una storia vera		FIMI: Platinum

=== Compilations ===
Year	Title	Sales	Certifications
2005	Tutti qui	ITA: 310,000	FIMI: Platinum
2006	Gli altri tutti qui	ITA: 225,000	
2018	Al Centro		FIMI: Gold

=== European albums ===
- 1982 - Alé Oó
- 1985 - Claudio Baglioni
- 1991 - Oltre

== Dvds ==
- 1991 - Oltre una bellissima notte
- 1996 - Baglioni nel Rosso
- 2000 - Sogno di una notte di note
- 2003 - Tutto in un abbraccio
- 2010 - World Tour
- 2019 - Al centro. Arena di Verona

== Tour ==
- 1977 - Claudio Baglioni on tour
- 1982 - Alé Oó
- 1985 - Notti di note
- 1986 - Assolo
- 1991 - Oltre una bellissima notte (only one concert)
- 1992 - Assieme
- 1995 - Tour Giallo
- 1996 - Tour Rosso
- 1998 - Da me a te
- 1999 - Tour Blu
- 2000 - Acustico
- 2003 - Tutto in un abbraccio
- 2006/2007 - Tutti qui
- 2010 - World Tour
- 2013 - Con voi tour
- 2018/2019 - Al centro
- 2022 - Tutti su!
- 2023/2024 - aTuttoCuore
- 2026 - GrandTour

== Awards ==
- 1974 - Festivalbar, best song of the year
- 1982 - TV Sorrisi e Canzoni, first Italian artist to fill stadiums and spectator records
- 1985 - Sanremo Music Festival 1985, the Italian Song of the Century Award
- 1987 - TV Sorrisi e Canzoni, representative of Italian music
- 1991 - Billboard, best concert of the year in the world
- 1998 - TV Sorrisi e Canzoni, record spectators in a single concert
- 2001 - Internet Winner, increased number of contacts to its website in the last year
- 2003 - Lunezia Award, musical and literary value
- 2008 - Man of Peace
- 2019 - TV Sorrisi e Canzoni, record spectators tour
- 2022 - Tenco Awards for career
- 2023 - SIAE Music Awards
- 2025 - Lunezia Award, musical and literary value
