= Kaiwá language =

Tupian language spoken in Argentina and Brazil

Kaiwá
- Kayova
- Native to: Argentina, Brazil
- Region: Mato Grosso do Sul
- Ethnicity: Kaiwá
- Native speakers: 18,000 (2003)
- Language family: Tupian: Tupi–Guarani; Guarani (I); Kaiwá–Paĩ Tavyterã; Kaiwá

Language codes
- ISO 639-3: kgk
- Glottolog: kaiw1246
- ELP: Kaiwá
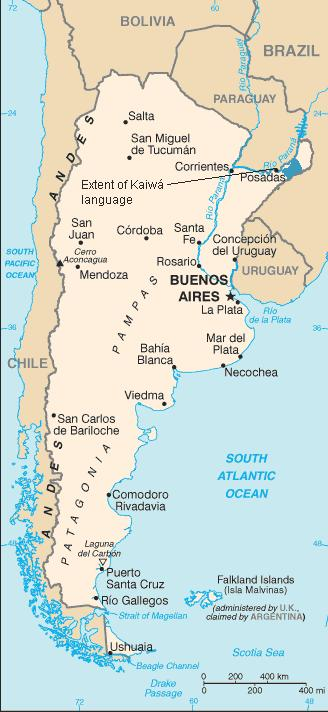
- Extent of the Kaiwá language in the northeast Argentine panhandle shown in teal.

Kaiwá is a Tupi–Guarani spoken by about 18,000 Kaiwá people in Brazil in the state of Mato Grosso do Sul and 510 people in northeastern Argentina. Literacy is 5-10% in Kaiwá and 15–25% in Portuguese. Kaiwá proper is 70% lexically similar to the Pai Tavytera language, and its similarity to its linguistic cousin Guarani, one of the two national-languages of Paraguay alongside the Spanish language, means it is even sometimes considered mutually intelligible.

== Phonology ==
=== Vowels ===
	Front		Central		Back	
	oral	nasal	oral	nasal	oral	nasal
Close	i	ĩ	ɨ	ɨ̃	u	ũ
Mid	e	ẽ			o	õ
Open			a	ã		

- /e/ can also be heard as [ɛ].

=== Consonants ===
		Labial	Alveolar	Palatal	Velar		Glottal
		Labial	Alveolar	Palatal	plain	labial	Glottal
Plosive	voiceless	p	t		k		ʔ
Plosive	voiced				ɡ	ɡʷ	
Plosive	prenasal	ᵐb ~ m	ⁿd ~ n	ᶮdʲ ~ ɲ			
Fricative		v	s	ʃ			h
Tap			ɾ				
Approximant				(j)		(w)	

- Prenasalized plosives can also be heard as nasals.
- [w] is heard as an allophone of /v/ or /u/.
- [j] is heard as an allophone of /i/.

== Sample text ==
Original Kaiwá text:

Eregwata-ramo ka'agwy-rupi erehexa gwa'a. Hagwe pytã porã. Oveve áry-rupi gwa'a. Oveve-ramo, "Kaa! Kaa!" he'i. Heta oĩ gwa'a ka'agwy-rupi.

Guarani translation:

Reguatáramo ka'aguýre rehecháta gua'a pytã. Hague pytã porã. Oveve yvatetere'i yvágare. Ovevẽro "Kaa! Kaa!" he'i. Heta oĩ gua'a pytã ka'aguýre.

Portuguese translation:

Quando você passeia no mato, você vê a arara. A plumagem dela é dum vermelho bonito. A arara voa no céu. Quando voa, grita "Kaa! Kaa!" Há muitas araras no mato.

Rough English translation:

When you walk in the bush, you see the macaw. The plumage is a beautiful red. The macaw flies in the sky. When it flies, it shouts "Kaa! Kaa!" There are many macaws in the bush.

== Bibliography ==
- Te'ýi nhe'ẽ. 5 Cartilha Kaiwá. Brasília, DF: Summer Institute of Linguistics. 1980.
- Bridgeman, Loraine I. (1961). "Kaiwa (Guarani) Phonology". International Journal of American Linguistics. 27 (4): 329–334. doi:10.1086/464654. ISSN 0020-7071.
- Taylor, John M.; Taylor, Audrey (1966). Statement of Kaiwá Grammar from Clause to Morpheme Level. Arquivo Linguístico. Vol. 44. Brasília, DF: Summer Institute of Linguistics.
- Cardoso, V. F. (2008). Aspectos Morfossintáticos da Língua Kaiowá (Guaraní) (PhD dissertation). Universidade Estadual de Campinas.
- Bridgeman, Loraine I. (1981). O parágrafo na fala dos kaiwá-guarani (Report). Summer Institute of Linguistics.
- Taylor, John M. (1975). A study of the marking of time in Kaiwá (Report). Summer Institute of Linguistics.
- Bridgeman, Loraine I. (1987). Kaiwá Pronouns (Report). Summer Institute of Linguistics.
- Taylor, John M. (1977). Um Estudo da Estrutura de Perguntas na Língua Kaiwá (Report). Summer Institute of Linguistics.
- Taylor, Audrey (1963). Gramática Pedagógica na Língua Kaiwá (Report). Summer Institute of Linguistics.
- Mejia, Blanca Flor Demenjour Munoz (2019). Morfologia verbal da língua Kaiowá. Curitiba: Appris Editora. ISBN 978-8547328481.
- Chamorro, Graciela (2023). Dicionário Kaiowá-Português (2nd ed.). Belo Horizonte: Editora Javali. ISBN 978-65-87635-31-6.
- Dooley, Robert A., ed. (1984). Estudos sobre línguas tupí do Brasil. Série Lingüística. Brasília, DF: Summer Institute of Linguistics.
- Harrison, Carl H.; Taylor, John M. (1971). Nasalization in Kaiwá (Report). Summer Institute of Linguistics.
- Ramires, Daiane (2019). Sintagmas Nominais no Kaiowá: expressão de número e (in)definitude (Master's thesis). Universidade de Brasília.
