= Tapieté dialect =

Tupian language

Tapieté
- Native to: Argentina, Paraguay, Bolivia
- Native speakers: 2,500 (2007)
- Language family: Tupian: Tupi–Guarani; Guaraní (I); Eastern Bolivian Guaraní; Tapieté

Official status
- Official language in: Bolivia

Language codes
- ISO 639-3: tpj
- Glottolog: tapi1253
- ELP: Tapiete
- Linguasphere: 88-AAI-fcc

Tapieté is a subdialect of Eastern Bolivian Guaraní. It is also known as Guasurango, Guasurangue, Tirumbae, Yanaigua, Ñanagua, and Nandeva.
