= Mbyá Guaraní dialect =

Tupian language spoken in South America

Mbyá Guaraní
- ayvu, nhandeayvu
- Native to: Argentina, Brazil, Paraguay, Uruguay
- Ethnicity: Guarani
- Native speakers: 15,050 (2007–2008)
- Language family: Tupian: Tupi–Guarani; Guarani; Mbyá Guaraní

Language codes
- ISO 639-3: gun
- Glottolog: mbya1239
- ELP: Mbyá

Mbyá Guaraní is a dialect of the Guarani language spoken by the Mbyá Guaraní. It is 75% lexically similar to Paraguayan Guarani.

Mbyá Guaraní is one of a number of "Guarani dialects" now generally classified as distinct languages. Mbyá is closely connected to Ava Guarani, also known as Ñandeva, and intermarriage between speakers of the two languages is common. Speakers of Mbyá and Ñandeva generally live in mountainous areas of the Atlantic Forest, from eastern Paraguay through Misiones Province of Argentina, Uruguay to the southern Brazilian states of Paraná, Santa Catarina, and Rio Grande do Sul.

== History ==
=== Documentation ===
In 2014, Brazil's Institute of National Historic and Artistic Heritage (IPHAN) officially recognized Guaraní-Mbyá as being of cultural significance in Brazilian history. This decision was the product of a pilot project that researched the number of speakers of the language in conjunction with other important indicators. There project was administered by the Political Linguistics Research and Development Institute (IPOL) who conducted research in more than 60 communities, documenting how the speakers defined, transmitted and used their language in daily life. At the end of this project, the findings were published in digital and text format and presented at a conference. The conference afforded the Guaraní an opportunity to express their endorsement of Guaraní-Mbyá being recognized as a cultural reference point in Brazilian history. Additionally, national recognition of the importance of this language granted the public the possibility of re-considering the important value of the Guaraní people to Brazilian history. It also provided the Guaraní an opportunity to develop stronger feelings of autonomy and agency with regard to their own cultural identities.

In 2009 The Guaraní Project began to be developed in the Documentation Project on Indigenous Culture (PRODOCULT) by the Museu do Indio with funding support from UNESCO and the Banco do Brasil foundation. The purpose of this project is to firstly document Guaraní culture through the words and actions of the Guaraní themselves, as well as aid in indigenous agency and independence through teaching them methodologies for documenting their culture, so they can ultimately tell their own cultural histories. The first phase of this project, and its base purpose, is to train young peoples from five separate Guaraní-Mbyá villages along the southern coast of Rio de Janeiro State in documenting and inventorying both material and non-material culture that they deem to be relevant to themselves in the present day, and their past cultural histories. The other phases of this project aim to introduce those residing in these villages to the process of micro-informatics, and other ways of documenting culture such as through photography.

== Phonology ==
=== Vowels ===
Mbyá Guaraní vowels
	Front		Central		Back	
	oral	nasal	oral	nasal	oral	nasal
Close	i	ĩ	ɨ	ɨ̃	u	ũ
Mid	e	ẽ			o	õ
Open			a	ã		

- /e o/ can also be heard as open-mid [ɛ ɔ] in free variation.
- /i u/ when preceding vowels can be heard as non-syllabic [i̯ u̯].
- Nasal vowels are contrastive only in stressed syllables.

=== Consonants ===
		Labial	Alveolar	Palatal (-alveolar)	Velar		Glottal
		Labial	Alveolar	Palatal (-alveolar)	plain	labial	Glottal
Nasal		m ~ ᵐb	n ~ ⁿd	ɲ ~ dʒ	ŋ ~ ᵑg	ŋʷ ~ gʷ	
Plosive/ Affricate	voiced	m ~ ᵐb	n ~ ⁿd	ɲ ~ dʒ	ŋ ~ ᵑg	ŋʷ ~ gʷ	
Plosive/ Affricate	voiceless	p	t	tʃ	k	kʷ	ʔ
Continuant		β ~ v	ɾ	(j)		(w)	h

- /β/ may be realized as [β ~ v ~ w] in free variation.
- /m n ŋ/ may be realized as prenasalized plosives [ᵐb ⁿd ᵑɡ] in free variation.
- /ɲ ŋʷ/ are realized as [j ~ dʒ ɡʷ] before oral vowels and as [ɲ ŋʷ] before nasal vowels.

== Morphology ==
=== Pronouns ===
Mbyá Guarani personal pronouns
1sg	xee
2sg	ndee
3sg	ha’e
1pl. incl.	nhande
1pl. excl.	ore
2pl	peẽ, pende
3pl	ha’e kuery

=== Temporal suffixes ===
In Mbyá Guarani, verbs are often left unmarked for tense. Instead, the present is left without any type of tense marker or morpheme connected to it indicating it is present. As such, verbs falling under present tense can have relative flexibility in connection to temporality. In other words, verbs in the present tense have the flexibility of also meaning remote past or near future. These are known as bare verbs, and refer to events that occur at the time of or shortly before the time of speaking. These sentences can only ever properly be used to answer questions in relation to the past, or in connection to the present, but never about the future.

Juan o-mba’eapo vaipa
Juan 3-wrk a.lot
‘Juan is working/was working/worked a lot

A relative clause, or a clause used to define the preceding noun, are formed with the particle va’e, which can in turn be combined with past and future morphemes to create different matrixes, as can be seen in examples below.

E-me’ẽ kyche mesa py o-ĩ va’e
IMP-give knife table on 3-be REL
‘Give me the knife that's on the table.’

Sometimes -kue, the past tense, can be represented by the allomorph -gue.

A-echa mburuvicha-kue
1-see leader-PAST
‘I saw the ex-leader’

The matrix of this term occurs when the relative clause va’e combines with -kue forming, va’ekue. Va’kue can be found in sentences that directly describe past events, or as a connecting anchor to a time before the past event being referenced by the speaker.

A-mba’eapo va’e-kue
1-work REL-PST
‘I worked/was working.’

In order to connect to future events, the morpheme suffix –rã is used. In English, – rã translates to meaning ‘future’, and it signifies the ‘future’ of something, as can be seen in the example below, or as something that only exists within the future.

Kuee, a-jogua che-ro-rã
Yesterday, 1-buy 1-house-FUT
‘Yesterday, I bought my (future) house.’

Similar to va’ekue, when the relative clause va’e combines with -rã, the morpheme suffix va’erã is formed. Va’erã is used to express a connection to broader future ties, and it can be found in sentences that describe directly future events.

Guaimi vy, Maria o-menda va-erã peteĩ ava o-guereko-pa va’e reve
Female.adult SS, Maria 3-marry REL-FUT one man 3-have-all REL with
‘When she is an adult, Maria will marry a man who is rich.’.

== Bibliography ==
- Martins, Marci Fileti (2003). Descrição e Análise de Aspectos da Gramática do Guarani Mbyá (PDF). Universidade Estadual de Campinas.
