= Eastern Bolivian Guaraní dialect =

Tupian language spoken in South America

Eastern Bolivian Guaraní
- Western Argentine Guaraní, "Chiriguano"
- Chawuncu
- Native to: Bolivia, Argentina, Paraguay
- Ethnicity: Ava Guaraní
- Native speakers: 51,000 (2004–2007)
- Language family: Tupian: Tupí–Guaraní; Guarani; Eastern Bolivian Guaraní
- Dialects: Izoceño (Chané)

Official status
- Official language in: Bolivia

Language codes
- ISO 639-3: gui
- Glottolog: east2555
- Linguasphere: 88-AAI-fcb

Eastern Bolivian Guaraní, known locally as Chawuncu or Chiriguano (pejorative), is a dialect of the Guarani language spoken in South America. In Bolivia 33,670 speakers, called the Ava Guaraní people were counted in the year 2000, in the south-central Parapeti River area and in the city of Tarija. In Argentina, there were approximately 15,000 speakers, mostly in Jujuy, but also in Salta Province, and 304 counted in the Paraguayan Chaco.

Avá (Chané, Tapieté) and Izoceño are dialects.

In Argentina it is known as Western Argentine Guaraní, while in Paraguay it is locally known as Ñandeva. However, outside Paraguay and specifically in Brazil, Nhandeva refers to Chiripá Guaraní.

Eastern Bolivian Guaraní is one of a number of "Guaraní dialects" sometimes considered distinct languages. Of these, Paraguayan Guaraní is by far the most widely spoken variety and it is often referred to simply as Guaraní.
