= Pai Tavytera =

Indigenous people of Paraguay and Brazil

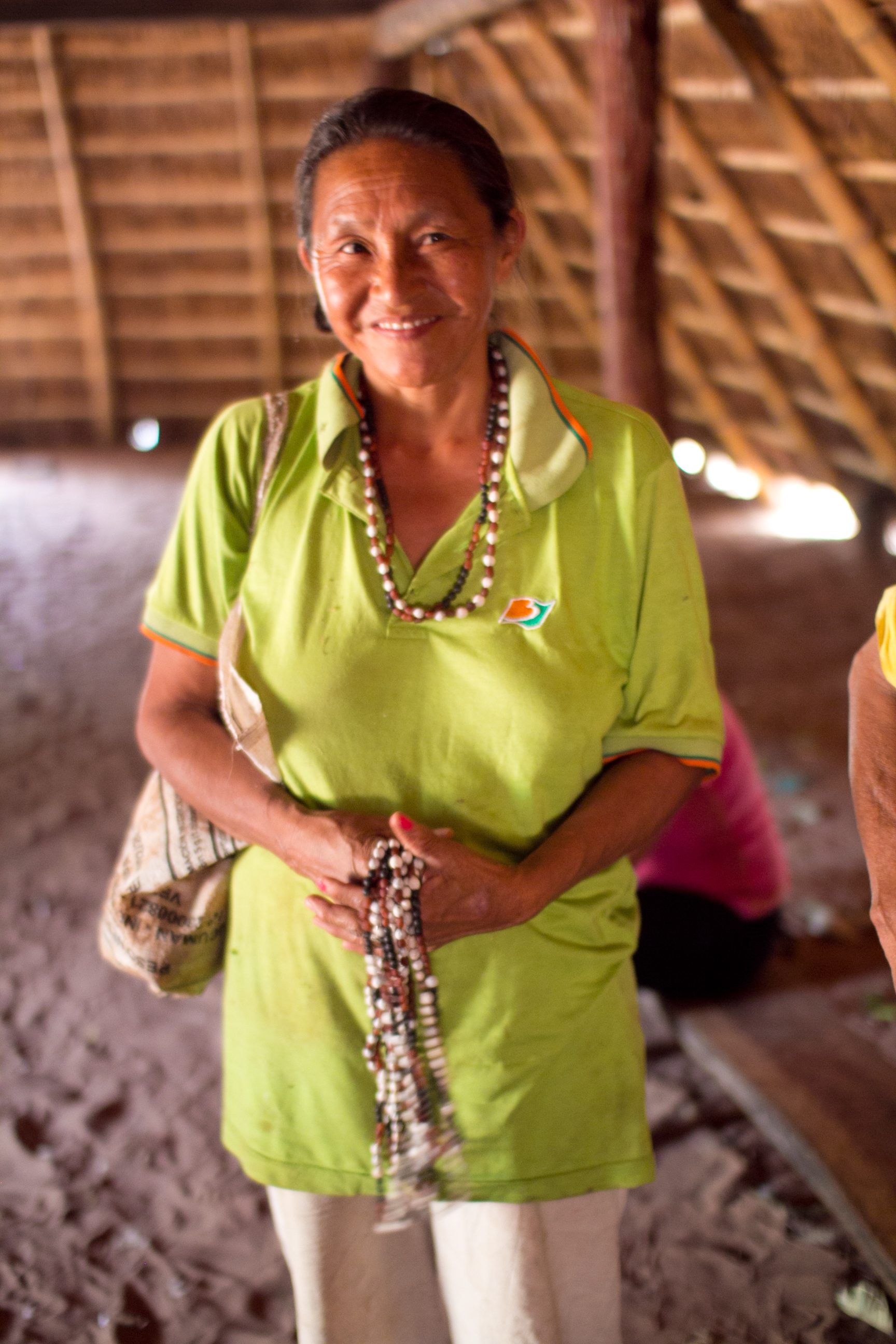
- Ña Silvia, a spiritual leader of the Pai Tavytera; Indians in Amambay, 2012

Total population
- 15,000 (2007)

Regions with significant populations
- Paraguay (Amambay Department); Brazil (Mato Grosso do Sul)

Languages
- Pai Tavytera

Religion
- Traditional tribal religion, Christianity

Related ethnic groups
- Kaiwá

The Pai Tavytera are an Indigenous people of Paraguay and Brazil. They primarily live in Amambay Department in Paraguay and the Brazilian state of Mato Grosso do Sul.

== Name ==
The Pai Tavytera are also known as the Ava, Caaguá, Caingua, Caiwá, Kaa'wa, Kainguá, Kaiowá, Kaiwá, Kayova, Montese, Paï, Paï-Cayuä, Paï-Tavyterä, Paingua, Pan, and Tavytera people. "Paï-Tavytera" is an arbitrary name given to northern Guaraní people of eastern Paraguay. They are closely related to the Guarani-Kaiowá people of Brazil.

== Language ==
The Pai Tavytera speak the Pai Tavytera language, which is a Tupi-Guarani language, division Guarani I. They are rapidly adopting the more mainstream Guarani language.

== History ==
The Pai Tavytera are mostly likely the descendants of the Itatin Guaraní. They encountered Jesuit missionaries in the 17th century during the reducciones of eastern Paraguay. Many of them resisted assimilation. Following the violent War of the Triple Alliance in the 1870s, their lands were left alone, except for lumberers and harvesters of yerba mate. In recent years, an influx of settlers have disrupted the Pai Tavytera's hunting lifestyle.

== Altar ==
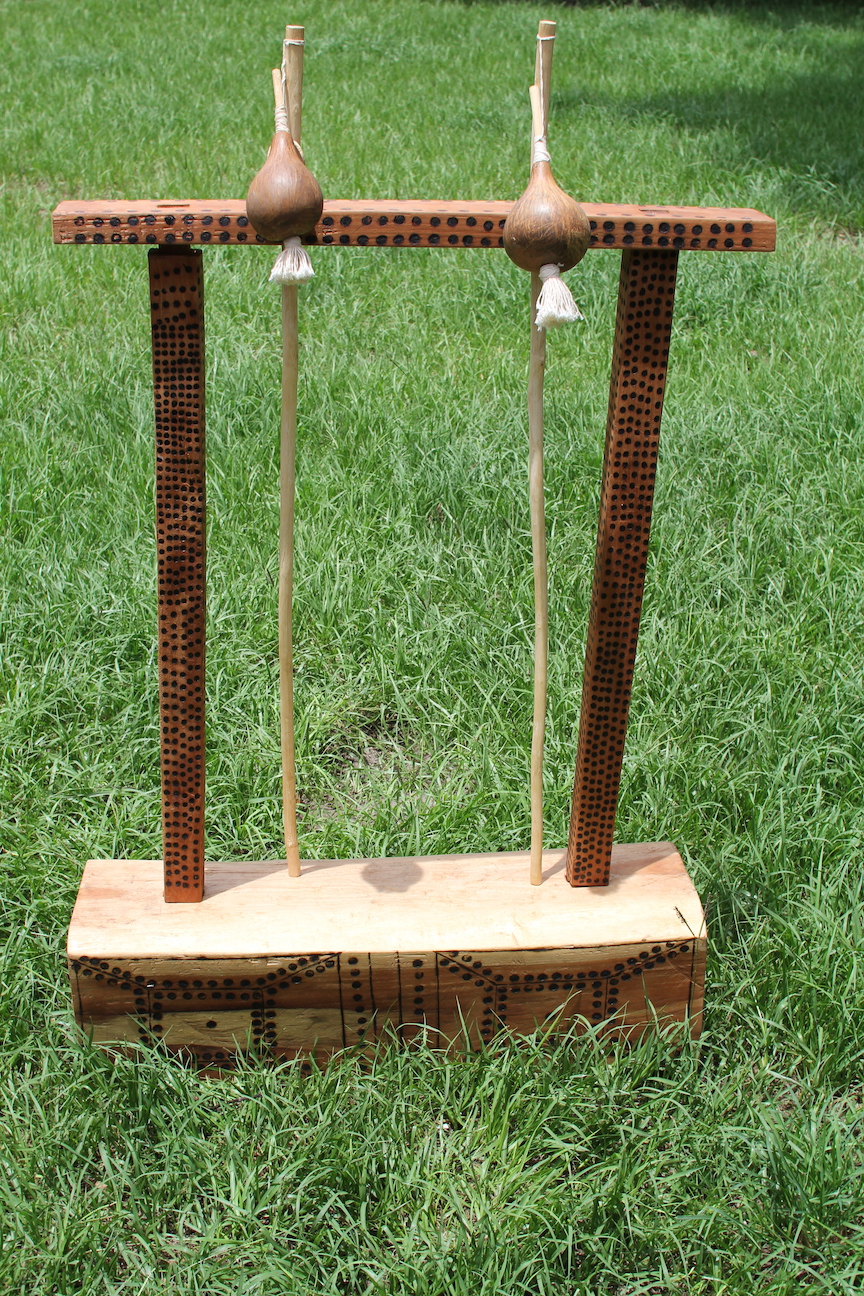
Mba’e marangatu, a community altar

The wood altar is the central institution in the religious beliefs of the Pai Tavytera. The altar, called mba’e marangatu in Guaraní is considered a sacred sanctuary and a focal point of the community. The altars usually resides in the homes of the spiritual leaders of the Pai Tavytera Indians or important leaders. The altar is a place where the community gathers around for worship or to discuss matters that are important to the community.

Altars include wooden rods that represents deities or saints. From those rods hangs a gourd used for baptizing children, and the medicine man's gourd rattle, the most important item for the spiritual healer to start his prayer that is a song and a dance to communicate with the spirits. Part of the altar is a taquara bamboo staff, a woman's musical instrument that gives rhythm to the rituals.

== Agriculture ==
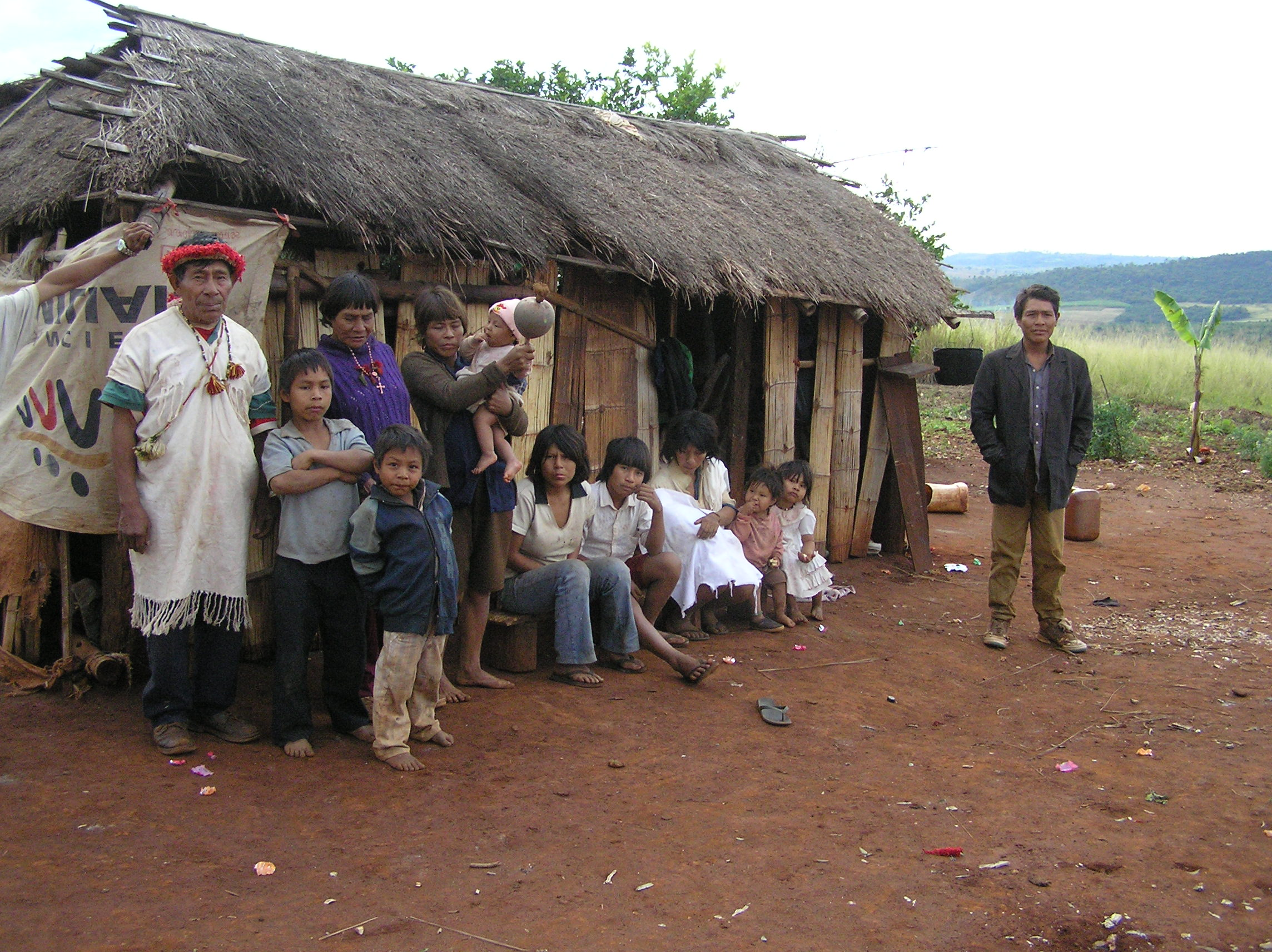
Pai Tavytera Indians, part of the Panambi'y tribe, in Amambay Department, 2005

In the sub-tropical environment of eastern Paraguay, Pai Tavyter practice swidden agriculture. Their primary crop is maize, supplemented with manioc. They also cultivate citrus trees, bananas, cotton, pineapples, rice, soybeans, and medicinal plants. Chickens, pigs, cattle, horses, and donkeys are popular farm animals.

== Artwork ==
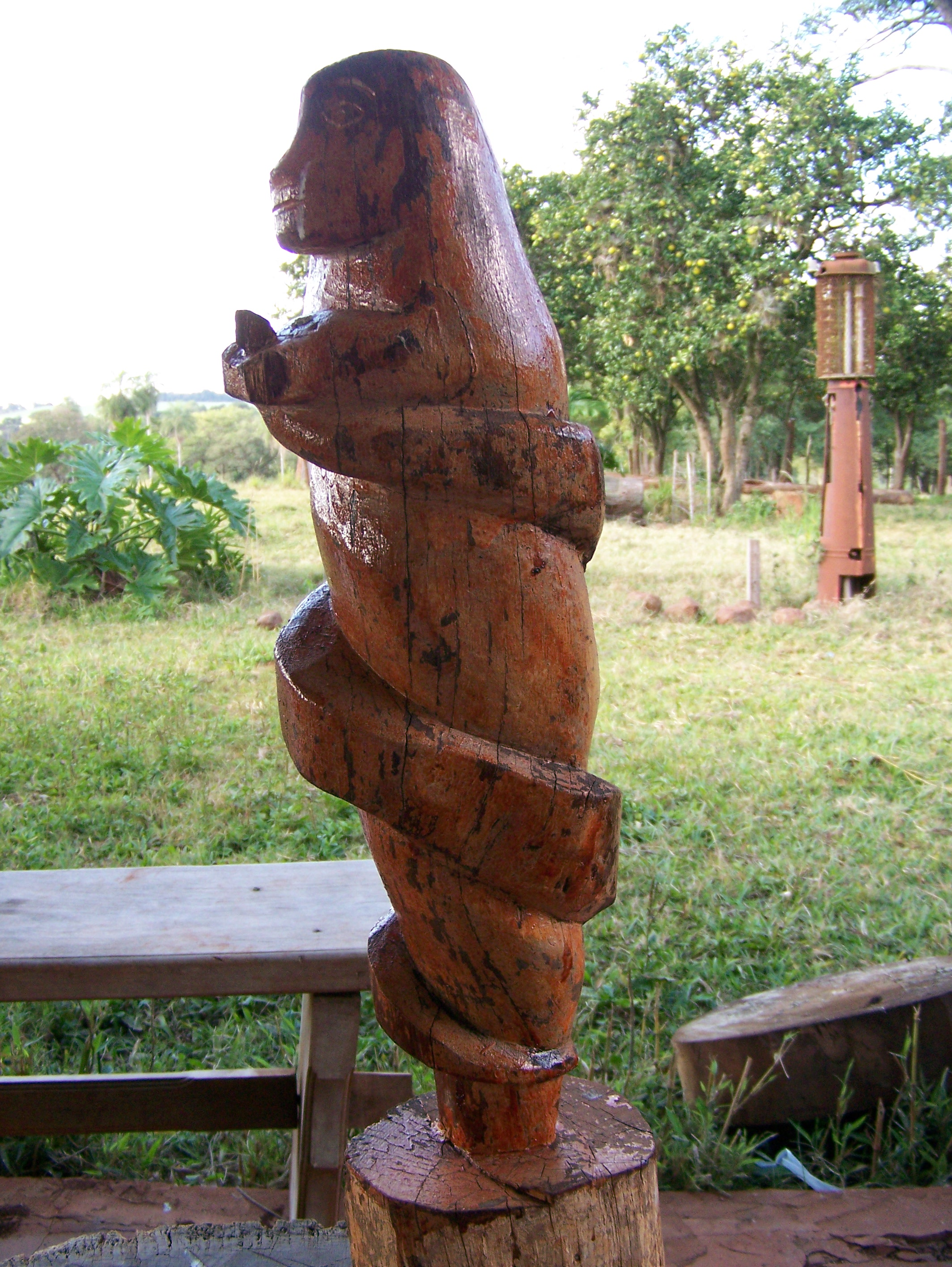
Pai Tavytera woodcarving of a popular mythological creature, Kurupi

Pai Tavytera people are known for making necklaces made from carved wood and colorful seeds of different fruits. They use urucú, a red dye made from Bixa orellana for body painting. Cotton and feathers, such as toucan, are used for headdresses. Labrets are made from resin. Men typically weave baskets, while women make ceramics.

The tribe is also being consulted in interpreting ancient rock art in Amambay. A hill, Jasuka Venda is an important cultural site for Pai Tavyera people that has petroglyphs in the "footstep style." Jasuka Venda is where Pai Tavytera oral history says God created the universe.
