= Guarani-Kaiowá =

Indigenous people of South America

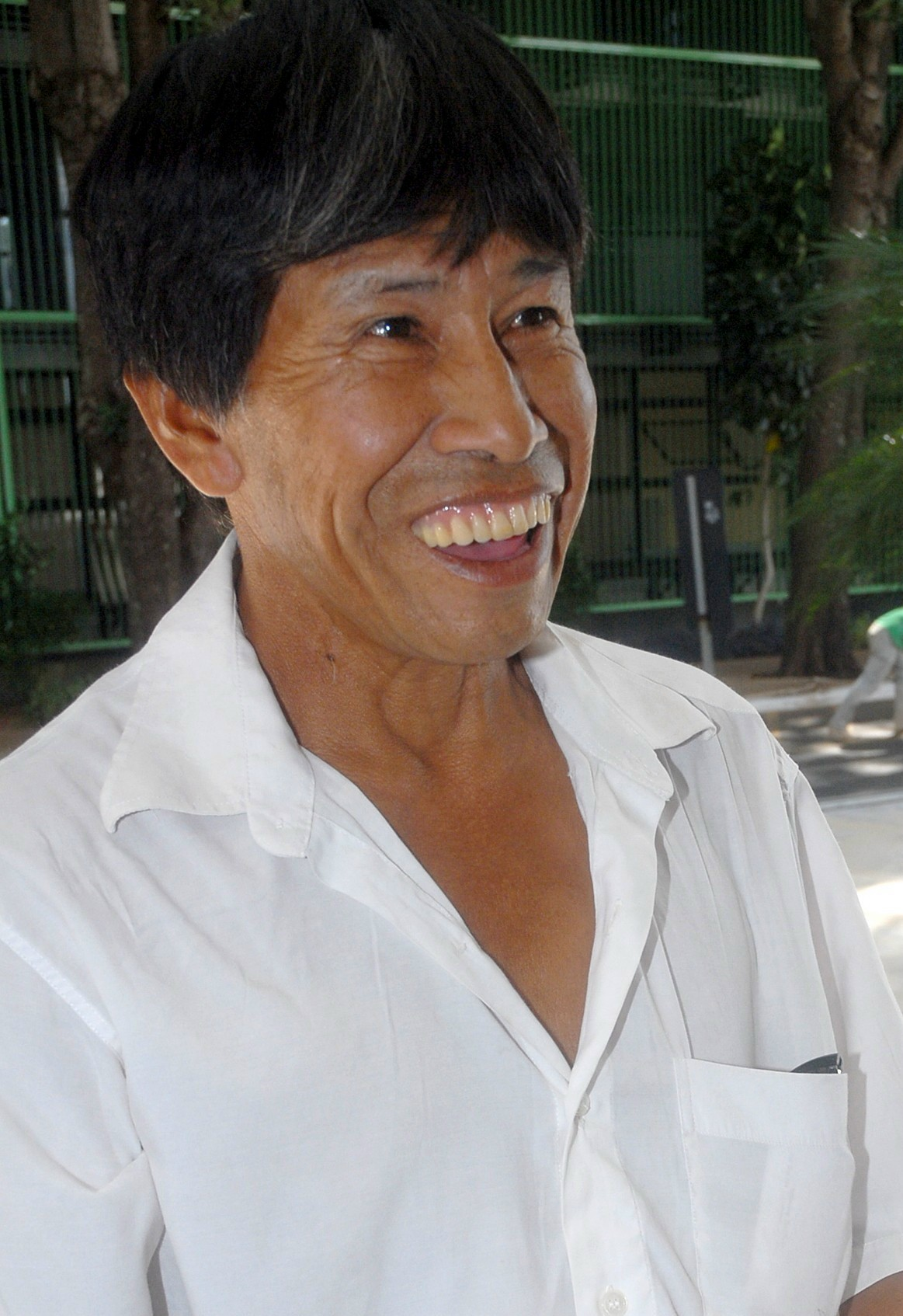
- Chief Hamilton Lopez of the Guarani-Kaiowás

Total population
- 18,510 (2003)

Regions with significant populations
- Brazil, Argentina

Languages
- Kaiwá language

Religion
- traditional tribal religion, Protestant, Catholic, Atheism

Related ethnic groups
- Pai Tavytera

The Guarani-Kaiowás (Portuguese pronunciation: [ɡwaɾaˈɲi kajjuˈwa]) are an Indigenous people of Paraguay, the Brazilian state of Mato Grosso do Sul and northeastern Argentina. In Brazil, they inhabit Ñande Ru Marangatu, an area of tropical rainforest. This was declared a reservation in October 2004. Marcos Verón, a leader of this people, was beaten to death in January 2003.

They are one of the three Guaraní sub-groups (the others are Ñandeva and Mbya).

They mainly live in the Brazilian state of Mato Grosso do Sul. It is estimated that more than 30,000 Guaranis live in Brazil. In Paraguay they number about 40,000. The Guaraní language is one of the official languages of Paraguay, alongside the Spanish language.

== Name ==
The Guarani-Kaiowá are also known as the Kaiwá, Caingua, Caiua, Caiwa, Cayua, Kaiova, and Kayova. These spellings were largely devised in Europe. The National Museum of Brazil (Portuguese: Museu Nacional) keeps records of the earliest latinized forms for transcribing the name on behalf of the people. The name Kaiowá means 'the people' in their own language.

== Language ==
They speak the Kaiwá language, a Tupi-Guarani language, Subgroup I. Literacy is extremely low—from 5% to 10%. Kaiwá is written in the Latin script.

== Culture ==
The Guaraní sub-groups have different ways of social organisation, but they share a religion which sees the land as very important. They believe that the god Ñande Ru created the Guarani as the first peoples, and the Guarani are deeply spiritual: there is a prayer house in every village and the cacique, or shaman, is of great importance in the community.

"Terra sem Mal", which means land without evil, is the land of the dead people in their mythology, and it is important that every soul can go to Terra sem Mal. When invaders occupy Guarani land, the Guarani feel as if their religion is offended, and when they lose their land to intruders they have too little land to sustain their traditional life, based on fishing, hunting, and farming.

Many live in abject poverty in camp sites at the side of busy motorways or in temporary settlements in occupied farmland in the state of Mato Grosso do Sul, in Central-West Region, Brazil. They consider this land to be their ancestral land.

Their lifestyle consists of living happily on their own land, growing small crops to support their livelihood. Their villages have schools and government assistance.

== Survival ==
The Guarani-Kaiowá had no contact with the European settlers before the late 1800s. Since the beginning of the 1980s, the Guarani-Kaiowá tribe has been gradually forced to leave their traditional settlements as a consequence of the deforestation to get soy, corn and cane plantations. This eviction process has worsened the Guarani-Kaiowá living conditions. Furthermore, the non-secured and underpaid work on plantations has provoked deaths, even of young children, during decades. The attacks this community has received have their root on the high profitability of the lands they inhabit for the growing of agri-businesses and biofuel industry. For example, the Guarani tribe has denounced for years the permanent threat of expulsion from their lands and the poisoning by farmers of their water resources.

The conflict of interest between Brazilian authorities and indigenous tribes has increased since the South American country was chosen to harbor the next Football World Cup in 2014. In October 2012, a group of 170 Kaiowás (50 men, 50 women and 70 children) camping for almost a year at the Cambará farm, near the Joguico River in Iguatemi, Mato Grosso do Sul, at the border with Paraguay, after an eviction order had been issued by a federal judge, declared they were ready to accept their extinction. According to a letter sent to the Conselho Indigenista Missionário (Cimi, Missionary Indian Council) and to the national management of Fundação Nacional do Índio (Funai):

We are already going to and want to be killed and buried along with our ancestors here where we are today, therefore, we ask the Government and the Federal Justice not to decree our eviction, but instead we request them to decree our mass death and to bury us all here. We ask them, once and for all, to decree our total decimation and extinction, besides sending many tractors to dig a large hole to drop and bury our bodies. This is our request to the federal judges. We already await this decision of the Federal Justice. Decree our mass death Guarani and Kaiowá of Pyelito Kus/Mbarakay and bury us here. Given that we fully decided it and won't leave this place dead or alive.

The federal order detailed that in case the indigenous community does not abandon the land, the Fundação Nacional do Índio (Funai) will have to pay 250 dollars per day they still occupy the territory.

Parts of the Brazilian press understood the letter as a mass suicide announcement. The Avaaz.org issued a petition against their genocide. The decision was suspended by a court order on October 30, 2012.

In 2012 the Indian museum in Rio de Janeiro, around which exists a Guarani-Kaiowá settlement, also received an eviction order. This settlement is next to Maracana football stadium, which in requirements of the FIFA, has to be expanded for the inauguration and closure ceremonies of the Football World Cup.

In October 2012 Rio de Janeiro’s Governor Sergio Cabral said in a press conference that it was necessary to overthrow the old museum. The building was abandoned in 1977 and occupied by indigenous communities since that moment. “It has no historic value and it is going to be demolished because the FIFA and World Cup Organizational Committee demand it” he explained. However, the FIFA clarified through a press note in posterior dates that it never asked for the demolition of the Indian Museum.

In the Guarani-Kaiowá and other ethnicities response to that decision was clear. The twelve of January 2012 a police unit arrived at the indigenous land without a judicial order to evict the community and the inhabitants were waiting to them at the beginning of the settlement to defend it. The settlement siege lasted over 12 hours and finished when the police unit left the territory without taking any action, as they never had the embargo and demolition judicial order. The retirement was applauded by the indigenous community. Despite this temporary victory, the Guarani-Kaiowá tribe is still threatened by more mobilizations that would try to evict them from the unique place they and their ancestral culture are protected.

== See also ==
- BirdWatchers, a 2008 film drama by Marco Bechis.
- Minas Gerais
- Potosí
- Carelli, V. (Director). (2016). Martírio [Film]
