= Ava Guarani dialect =

Guaraní language of South America

Ava Guarani
- Ava
- Native to: Paraguay, Brazil, Argentina
- Ethnicity: Ava Guaraní
- Native speakers: (16,350 cited 1995–2012)
- Language family: Tupian: Tupí–Guaraní; Guarani; Ava Guarani

Language codes
- ISO 639-3: nhd
- Glottolog: chir1286
- ELP: Ñandeva

Chiripá Guaraní (Tsiripá, Txiripá), also known as Ava Guaraní and Nhandéva (Ñandeva), is a dialect of the Guarani language spoken in Paraguay, Brazil, and also Argentina. Nhandéva is closely connected to Mbyá Guaraní, as intermarriage between speakers of the two languages is common. Speakers of Nhandéva and Mbyá generally live in mountainous areas of the Atlantic Forest, from eastern Paraguay through Misiones Province of Argentina to the southern Brazilian states of Paraná, Santa Catarina, and Rio Grande do Sul. There are approximately 4,900 speakers in Brazil and 7,000 in Paraguay.

== Phonology ==
=== Vowels ===
| | Front | | Central | | Back | |
| | oral | nasal | oral | nasal | oral | nasal |
|---|---|---|---|---|---|---|
| Close | i | ĩ | ɨ | ɨ̃ | u | ũ |
| Open-mid | ɛ | ɛ̃ | | | ɔ | ɔ̃ |
| Open | | | a | ã | | |

- /a ɨ ɛ ɔ/ may also be realized as [ɐ ɯ e o].

=== Consonants ===
| | | Labial | Alveolar | Palatal | Velar | | Glottal |
| | | Labial | Alveolar | Palatal | plain | labial | Glottal |
|---|---|---|---|---|---|---|---|
| Plosive | voiceless | p | t | | k | kʷ | ʔ |
| Plosive | voiced | | | | ɡ | ɡʷ | |
| Plosive | prenasal | ᵐb ~ m | ⁿd ~ n | | | | |
| Affricate | | | ts | tʃ | | | |
| Tap | | | ɾ | | | | |
| Approximant | | | | j ~ ɲ | ɰ | w | |

- /ᵐb ⁿd/ may also be realized as nasal sonorants [m n] in front of nasal vowels.
- /j/ can be heard as [ɲ] within nasal syllables, and as a prenasal affricate [ⁿdʒ] when /j/ precedes nasal syllables in coda position.
- /j/ can be heard as [dʒ] within syllable onset before oral vowels.
- /k kʷ/ can be heard as [ᵑɡ ᵑɡʷ] between or after nasal vowels.
- /ts/ can also be heard as [s] word-medially in free variation.
- /w/ can be heard in free variation between labiodental sounds [ʋ] or [v] among speakers of different areas.
- /w ɾ j/ within nasal syllables are realized as nasalized [w̃ ɾ̃ j̃].
