= R. Natalie P. Goodall =

American-Argentinian natural historian (1935–2015)

Rae Natalie Prosser de Goodall (née Rae Natalie Prosser) April 13, 1935, near Lexington, Ohio, United States – May 25, 2015, Estancia Harberton, Tierra del Fuego Province, Argentina,) also known as Natalie Goodall, was a botanist, cetologist, illustrator, natural historian and local historian based in Tierra del Fuego Province, Argentina and known for studying the region's flora and fauna.

== Education ==
Rae Natalie Prosser de Goodall was born Rae Natalie Prosser on a farm near Lexington, Ohio. She graduated from Lexington High School in 1953. She was awarded an art scholarship to Kent State University, where she became a member of the Gamma Phi Beta sorority. Prosser graduated with bachelor's degrees in education, biology, and art, as well as a master's degree in biology. She was awarded an honorary doctorate from Kent State University in 1997.

== Career ==
Despite a busy and challenging life managing Estancia Harberton and family on the Beagle Channel in the 1960s, Goodall found the time and energy to study and draw the natural history, flora and fauna of the surrounding area, and eventually of Tierra del Fuego as a whole. She began collecting and drawing plants, with her herbarium becoming the basis for understanding the flora of the island, and together with her drawings, an important foundation for a later book to which she contributed, Flora of Tierra del Fuego.

A self-described "beachcomber", Goodall also started collecting dolphin and whale specimens during this time, especially skulls, from local cetacean strandings. Over the course of her life, she collected nearly 3000 mammal specimens and initially curated these together with her 2500 bird skeletons (and hundreds of plant specimens) at her home in Harberton. Goodall also kept records of observations of sightings of living dolphins and whales that she made herself, or that others in the area provided to her. In this way, she became a world expert in southern South American cetology and botany.

Goodall collected plants with several other notable botanists including Lincoln Constance, Alicia Lourteig, Theodore Robert Dudley, David Moore, and others. She also collaborated with dozens of botanical and cetacean researchers from around the world.

In 2001, Goodall donated and curated items from her personal collection to create the Acatushun Museum of Austral Birds and Mammals (Museo Acatushun) on the grounds of Estancia Harberton. Many of her specimens are also housed at numerous international herbaria and natural history institutions, and some of these are the most important specimens in the world, as they represent collections of several little-known and sparsely-collected species of dolphins and whales including Cephalorhynchus commersonii, Lagenorhynchus australis, L. cruciger, and Mesoplodon hectori.

She received research funding from the National Geographic Society and collaborated with other national and international organizations devoted to nature research, including AMMA (Association of Southern Marine Mammals), the Orca del Fin del Mundo project and CEQUA (Center for Quaternary Studies). She founded and chaired the RNP Foundation (Rae Natalie Prosser Foundation) for biological research in Southern South America, which endows internships and scholarships for students and professionals in the natural sciences.

== Notable works ==
In 1970, Goodall published a bilingual English-Spanish book, Tierra del Fuego, containing studies of the local flora and fauna, as well as historical information about the settlement of the area. She both wrote and illustrated the book, and published several editions of it at the publishing company she founded, Ediciones Shanamaiim. This book continues to be used both as a tourist guide and a reference manual and is considered an ad honorem historical work.

Goodall was also one of the main contributors and illustrators of David Moore's 1983 book, Flora of Tierra del Fuego. According to Moore, Goodall should have been co-author on the book, but it was her choice not to be. Her line drawings are described as being an "attractive and informative" part of the book, and her herbarium specimens provided key information about each species.

Some of Goodall's drawings of the plants and wildlife of Tierra del Fuego are in the collection of the Hunt Botanical Library, which is part of the Hunt Institute for Botanical Documentation at Carnegie Mellon University in Pittsburgh, Pennsylvania. She was also featured as a botanical artist in the book Botanical Art and Illustration (1972–1973), a publication of the Hunt library.

== Publications ==
Throughout her life, Goodall published over 200 scientific publications, including peer-reviewed papers, book chapters, and scientific conference abstracts. She also presented her research at international scientific conferences. Additional notable publications include:

- "Interspecific variation of ontogeny and skull shape among porpoises (Phocoenidae)", in Journal of Morphology.
- "On the identity of Tursio Chiloensis Philippi 1900", in Marine Mammal Science.
- "Serrated Flippers and Directional Asymmetry in the Appendicular Skeleton of the Commerson's Dolphin", in The Anatomical Record.

== Personal life and family ==
She worked as a teacher for Mobil in Venezuela after graduating, during which time she traveled extensively in Venezuela, Colombia, and the Caribbean islands, studying the local plants and wildlife. On a trip to western South America with a fellow teacher, Prosser visited the Tierra del Fuego area, having been inspired by Lucas Bridges' book Uttermost Part of the Earth. While on this trip she met her future husband Thomas Goodall, a great-nephew of the book's author and manager of the Estancia Harberton (Harberton Ranch) featured in the book. The two were married in the United States in 1963.

Goodall and her husband continued to maintain Estancia Harberton for the remainder of her life, raising two daughters, Anne and Abby, on the ranch and in the nearby city of Ushuaia. Her husband, children, and six grandchildren are the fourth, fifth and sixth-generation descendants, respectively, of Thomas Bridges, the builder of Estancia Harberton and an Anglican missionary credited with spreading Christianity in the Tierra del Fuego region.

== Death ==
Goodall died of natural causes on May 25, 2015 at home at Estancia Harberton. Goodall's family has continued to manage Estancia Harberton following her 2015 death.

== Memberships ==
- Museo Argentino de Ciencias Naturales «Bernardino Rivadavia», Ciudad Autónoma de Buenos Aires
- Museum of the End of the World, Ushuaia, Tierra del Fuego, Argentina.
- Museum of New Zealand Te Papa Tongarewa (formerly the National Museum of New Zealand).
- Museo de la Ciudad, Río Grande, Tierra del Fuego.
- Long Marine Laboratory, University of California Santa Cruz
- Centro Austral de Investigaciones Científicas (CADIC), Ushuaia, Tierra del Fuego.
- Independent ad honorem researcher of the National Council of Scientific and Technical Research of Argentina (Conicet)
- Solamac Latin American Society, an organization focused on aquatic mammals.

== Awards ==
- Albatross Prize, Universidad Nacional de la Patagonia San Juan Bosco, 1983.
- International guest member, The Society of Woman Geographers, 1984.
- Lighthouse of the End of the World, a prize awarded by the government of Tierra del Fuego, 1994.
- International guest member, Explorers Club of New York, 1995.
- Gold Medal, The Society of Woman Geographers, 1996. (Awarded for her studies of the plants and wildlife native to Tierra del Fuego)
- Member of the Ohio Women's Hall of Fame, 1996.
- Recipient of Doctorate Honoris Causa in Sciences, Kent State University, 1997.
- Special Achievement Award, Kent State University Alumnae, 1997.
- Pink Carnation Award, highest award of Gamma Phi Beta, 1998.
