= Aureliano Oyarzún =

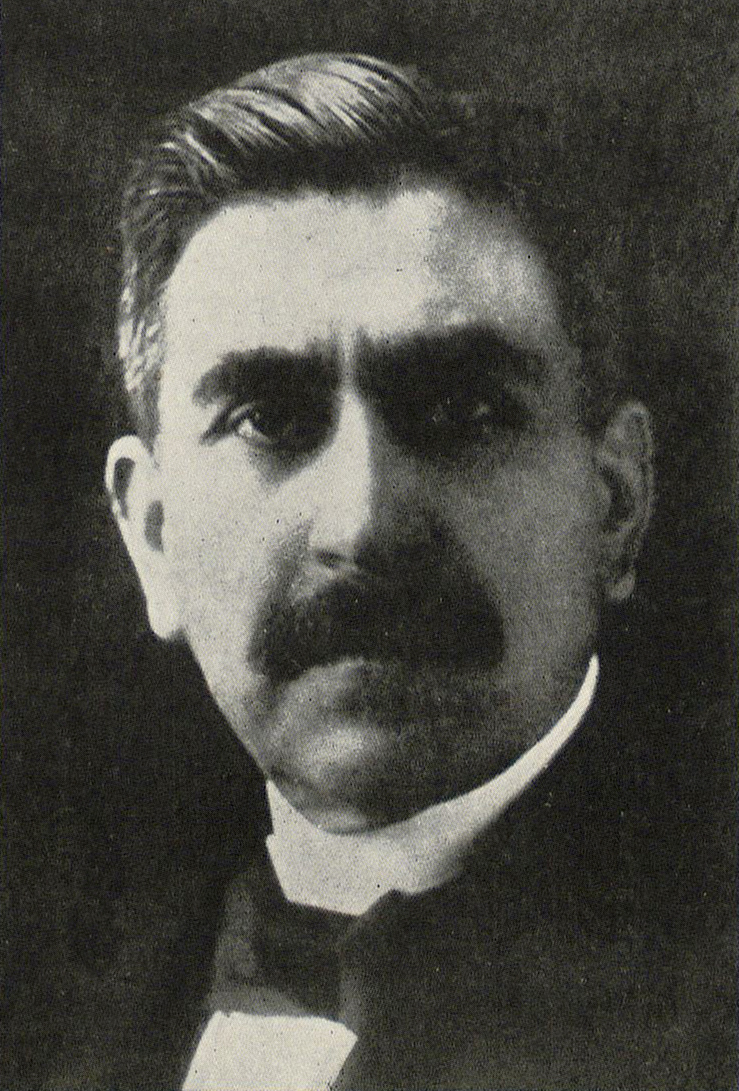
Aureliano Oyarzún Nevarro Portrait

Aureliano Oyarzún Navarro (b. 1858 – d. 1947) was a Chilean physician, who became an anthropologist through his study of native cultures in Chile, including the indigenous peoples of Tierra del Fuego. He is considered among the most prominent early 20th-century researchers, together with the Austrians Max Uhle and Martin Gusinde.

== Early life and education ==
Aureliano Oyarzún Navarro was born to Oyarzún and Navarro. He was of Basque descent through his father. He attended local schools before university, where he studied medicine.

== Academic career ==
He was appointed to succeed Francisco Puelma Tupper as professor of pathology in the medical school of University of Chile in 1891. In the 1891 Chilean Civil War, Puelma was a supporter of President José Manuel Balmaceda and was expelled from the university. Oyarzún was later replaced by Emilio Croizet.

During the conflict, Oyarzún participated in the War of the Pacific and the Chilean occupation of Lima, Peru.

Oyarzún did much research of the indigenous peoples of Chile, particularly in Tierra del Fuego. He was a prolific writer on the subject, studying the Selkʼnam and Yaghan.
