= 2449 Kenos =

Mars-crossing asteroid

Discovery
- Discovered by: W. Liller
- Discovery site: Cerro Tololo
- Discovery date: 8 April 1978

Designations
- Named after: Kenos (Selknam mythology)
- Alternative designations: 1978 GC
- Minor planet category: Mars-crosser · Hungaria · binary

Orbital characteristics
- Epoch 4 September 2017 (JD 2458000.5)
- Uncertainty parameter 0
- Observation arc: 38.93 yr (14,220 days)
- Aphelion: 2.2303 AU
- Perihelion: 1.5872 AU
- Semi-major axis: 1.9088 AU
- Eccentricity: 0.1685
- Orbital period (sidereal): 2.64 yr (963 days)
- Mean anomaly: 258.57°
- Mean motion: 0° 22^{m} 25.32^{s} / day
- Inclination: 24.986°
- Longitude of ascending node: 179.86°
- Argument of perihelion: 102.25°

Physical characteristics
- Dimensions: 2.95 km (calculated)
- Synodic rotation period: 3.846±0.001 h 3.8481±0.0003 h 3.8492±0.0008 h 4.188±0.007 h
- Geometric albedo: 0.4 (assumed)
- Spectral type: Tholen = E · CX · E B–V = 0.684; U–B = 0.356
- Absolute magnitude (H): 14.07±0.09 · 14.26 · 14.46±0.48

2449 Kenos, provisional designation 1978 GC, is a bright Hungaria asteroid and medium-sized Mars-crosser from the inner regions of the asteroid belt, approximately 3 kilometers in diameter. It was discovered by American astronomer William Liller at Cerro Tololo Inter-American Observatory in Chile, on 8 April 1978, and named after Kenos from Selknam mythology. A minor-planet moon was discovered around the asteroid on 27 February 2015.

== Orbit and classification ==
Kenos is a member of the Hungaria family, which form the innermost dense concentration of asteroids in the Solar System. IT orbits the Sun in the inner main-belt at a distance of 1.6–2.2 AU once every 2 years and 8 months (963 days). Its orbit has an eccentricity of 0.17 and an inclination of 25° with respect to the ecliptic. Based on assumption made by the Collaborative Asteroid Lightcurve Link, the body has a high albedo of 0.4, which is typical for E-type asteroids with a magnesium silicate surface (also see Enstatite chondrite).

== Physical characteristics ==
In the Tholen taxonomy, Kenos is an E-type asteroid. PanSTARRS has characterized it as a CX-type, which transitions between the C-type and X-type asteroids.

Observations performed at the Palmer Divide Observatory (716) in Colorado Springs, Colorado, during 2007 produced a lightcurve with a period of 3.8492 hours and a brightness range of 0.20 in magnitude. Two more recent observations confirmed the 3.85-hour period.

== Naming ==
This minor planet was named after Kenos, the first man in the Selknam mythology of the Native Americans of Tierra del Fuego, sent by the Supreme Being to bring order into the world. He created the human race by using peat to make male and female organs, taught them language and instructed them in rules to fashion a harmonious society. The official naming citation was published by the Minor Planet Center on 6 February 1993 (M.P.C. 21606).
