= Ángela Loij =

Last surviving person of full-blooded Selkʼnam descent

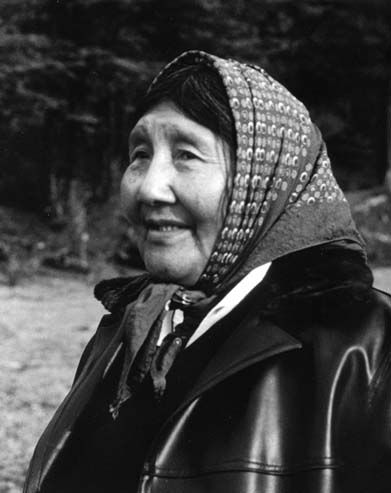
- Loij as photographed in 1966
- Born: c. 1900; Río Grande Department, Argentina
- Died: 18 May 1974 (aged c. 74); Tierra del Fuego Province, Chile
- Spouses: Nelson Qànqòt (separated 1930s); José Isaías Ule (m. 1955; died 1969)
- Children: 3

Ángela Loij López (c. 1900 – 28 May 1974), baptized as Ángela Gómez, was an Argentine-Chilean woman considered to be the last surviving individual of full-blooded Selkʼnam (Ona) descent, an indigenous group that resides in Tierra del Fuego.

As a young woman, she married Nelson Qànqòt, a Haush baptized by missionaries as Toribio, with whom she had two daughters and a son: Víctor Nelson (born 1919), Laura Soto (born 1922), and Luisa Nelson (born 1926). She participated in a traditional Hain ceremony documented in 1924 by Austrian ethnologist Martin Gusinde. During the late 1930s, she joined missionaries and was baptized to leave her conflictive relationship with her husband. All three of her children died in 1938 of tuberculosis without further descendants. In 1955, she married José Isaías Ule, a young Chilean worker who died in 1969, after which she inherited his house, where she lived on until she died.

In her later years, she was studied by anthropologist Anne Chapman. Loij was born at the Estancia Sara ranch, north of Río Grande, where her father, Loij, worked as a shepherd. She had one brother, Pascual. Her grand-niece, Amalia Gudiño, became a nurse and was elected as a deputy in the Argentine Chamber of Deputies in 1995, becoming the first indigenous person to serve as a deputy in Argentina. Loij was found dead in her home in May 1974, victim of a stroke she suffered at dawn. A school in the Río Grande Department was named in her honour.

== See also ==
- Lola Kiepja
