= Lola Kiepja =

Selk'nam shaman

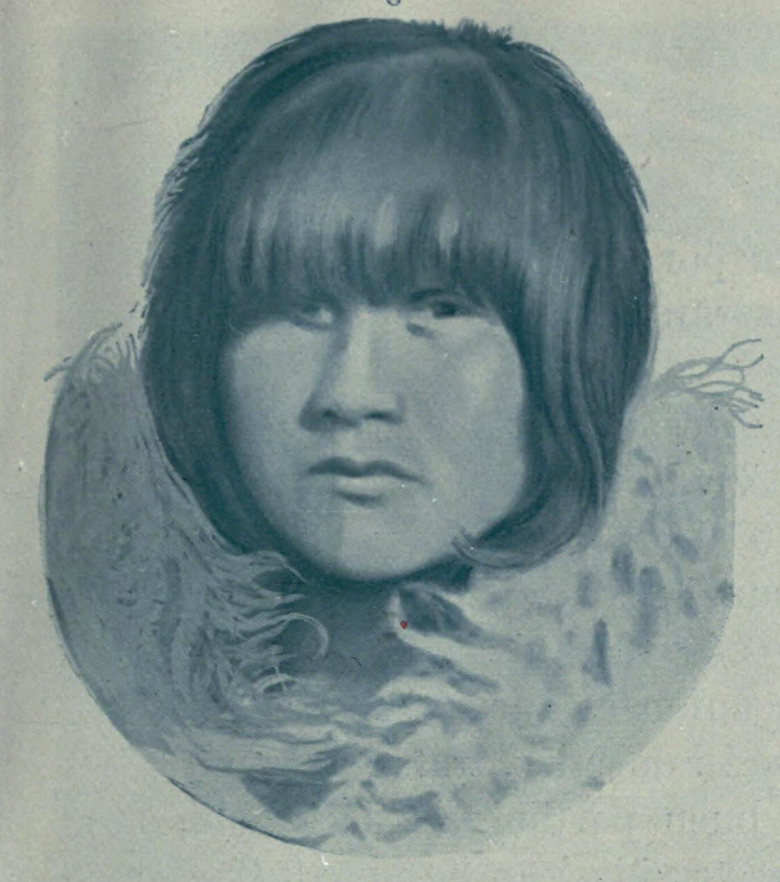
- Lola Kiepja illustrated in her youth, from the book Los onas (1910), by Carlos Gallardo.
- Born: c. 1874; Tierra del Fuego
- Died: 9 October 1966 (aged c. 92); Río Grande, Tierra del Fuego, Argentina
- Occupation: Religious shaman
- Spouses: Anik (died c. 1915)
- Children: 12

Lola Kiepja (c. 1874 – 9 October 1966) was a Selkʼnam shaman nationalized as an Argentine, known as "the last Ona" or "the last Selkʼnam", due to being the last person of Selkʼnam ethnicity to have directly grown up in an indigenous community, having learned their way of life, traditions, religion, and language.

The last person of full Selkʼnam ethnicity was Ángela Loij, a Chilean national who died 1974.

For context, the descendants of the previously considered extinct Selkʼnam people are in the process of cultural reappropriation and re-creation and do not consider themselves or their people as extinct.

== Biography ==
Lola was born around 1874 to Ket and Ejih, (Note: Selkʼnam names were traditionally mononymous. After adopting to an Argentine way of life, she took a modified version of her father's name, Ket, as a surname, a practice also done by Ángela Loij.) a Selkʼnam couple from the Tierra del Fuego island, now jointly owned by the Chilean and Argentine governments. Her maternal grandfather, Alaken, was a shaman and historian renowned by his people for his expansive knowledge of the legendary past. Two of her maternal uncles were also shamans.

She had seven children with her first husband, Anik, a Haush who was badly wounded in the knee during a battle making part of the Selkʼnam genocide, which halted her process of becoming a shaman. Anik died around 1915, after which she contracted a second marriage with a Chilean, managing to have five children with him. All of her children predeceased her: her only living descendants at the time of her death were a granddaughter adopted by the priest Luis Garibaldi Honte and a great-grandson. She spent her adult life on an indigenous reservation located near Lake Fagnano.

In 1964, American ethnologist Anne Chapman traveled to Tierra del Fuego for the first time to record Selkʼnam traditions and songs, including the testimony of Lola Kiepja. Chapman has reported that the notion that Lola Kiepja could be considered "the last Ona" to the French archaeologist Annette Laming-Emperaire, who conveyed the importance of recording her testimony to Chapman.

Chapman recorded Lola Kiepja's songs on a tape recorder and several of these records were published on a two-volume album duology produced by the anthropology museum Musée de l'Homme in Paris: Selkʼnam chants of Tierra del Fuego, Argentina. The records were later uploaded online, where they can now be listened to. These recordings were remastered and re-released in Spanish in 2018.

In the winter of 1966, she was transferred against her own will to the Rio Grande Regional Hospital due to a grave sickness, despite her having declared that she would prefer not to leave her hometown anymore. She died three days later, on 9 October.
