= Selkʼnam mythology =

Selkʼnam mythology is the body of myths of the Selkʼnam and Haush peoples of Tierra del Fuego.

== Sources ==
Selkʼnam mythology is known today primarily from the works of the Austrian ethnologist Martin Gusinde and the Franco-American ethnologist Anne Chapman.

== Cosmology ==
In the Selkʼnam and Haush mythology, the cosmos is divided in four shóʼon or infinite skies, which represent the four cardinal directions:

- Kamuk: Northern sky.
- Kéikruk: Southern sky.
- Wintek: Eastern sky. It is considered the most important of the four shóʼon, being the residence of Temáukel and source of all that exists.
- Kenénik: Western sky.

Each shóʼon is associated with one of the seasons. Kamuk symbolizes the spring and summer, Kéikruk symbolizes the winter, Kenénik symbolizes the autumn and, finally, Wintek symbolizes all the seasons and, possibly, even the time.

== Gods and spirits ==
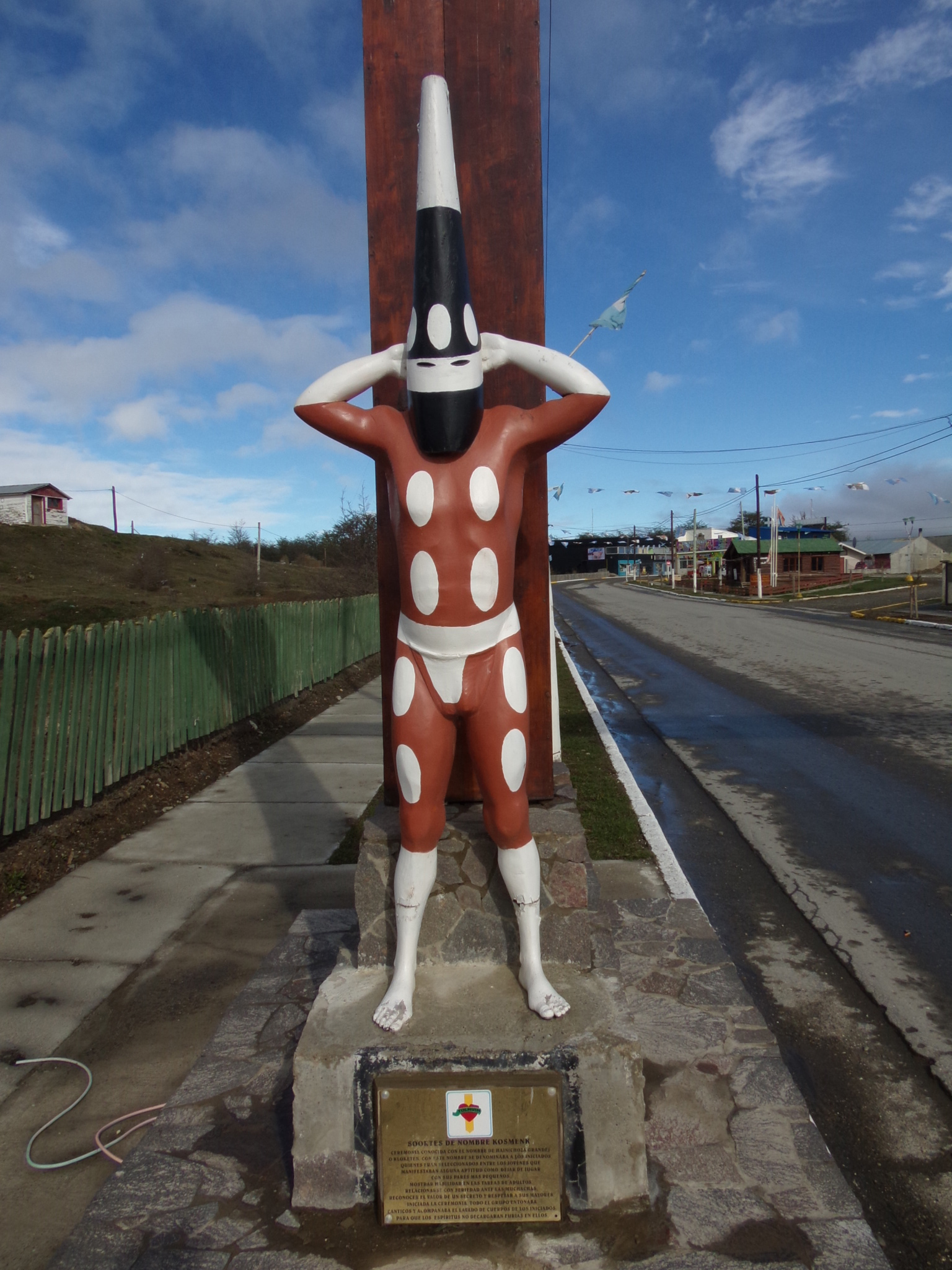
Statue of Kosmenk, one of the Soorts, in Tolhuin, Tierra del Fuego

The religion of the Selkʼnam people tends to be described as polytheistic, mainly because of the existence of various characters which are usually considered deities. However, according to the beliefs of the Selkʼnam people, only Temáukel is recognized as a god, while other characters are identified as mythological ancestors rather than gods. On the other hand, the characteristics attributed to these mythological ancestors are typical of those beings whom might be called gods. Because of this, it is possible to consider that the religion of the Selkʼnam people was, rather, henotheistic. Thus, there is a superior being, similar to the God of the Abrahamic religions, which corresponds to Temáukel; mythological gods or ancestors called howenh, of which the first to inhabit the Earth was Kenos, a creator and terraforming god, sent by Temáukel; and, finally, Xalpen and her subordinates, soorts, who were inhabitants of the underworld, which were represented by men in the Hain ceremony.

=== Temáukel ===
Temáukel is the supreme god of the Selkʼnam and Haush pantheon and, in theory, of all Selkʼnam deities, is the only one that is considered a god, since the other deities are identified, rather as mythological ancestors. He is a primordial god and, therefore, has always existed. He dwells in the celestial dome, in the eastern sky or Wintek and is the creator of it and the primitive Earth.

=== Howenh ===
Howenh were not recognized as gods by the Selkʼnam people, but rather as mythological ancestors, since the only divinity as such is Temáukel. They constitute the great forces of nature and terraforming elements, but before becoming such elements, they existed as humans. Among the most important are Kenos, the first howenh; Kwányip and Čénuke; Kojh, howenh of the sea; Kren, howenh of the sun; Kre, howenh of the moon; Josh, howenh of the snow; and Shenrr, howenh of the wind.

==== Kenos ====
Kenos was the first howenh to inhabit the Earth. He is the creator, organizer and civilizing god in Selkʼnam mythology, and the most important deity after Temáukel. He was sent by him from the Celestial dome to the early Earth, with the mission to organize it and create the mythological ancestors who would shape the Earth.

=== Xalpen and her Soorts ===
Xalpen is the goddess of the underworld. She has seven companions called Soorts: Sate, Yoisik, Wakus, Keyaisl, Talen, Pawus and Sanu. Besides them, there are many subordinate Soorts who are not assigned a specific name.

== See also ==
- Selkʼnam people
