= Selkʼnam people =

Ethnic group in Patagonia and Tierra del Fuego

Selkʼnam Onawo Ona
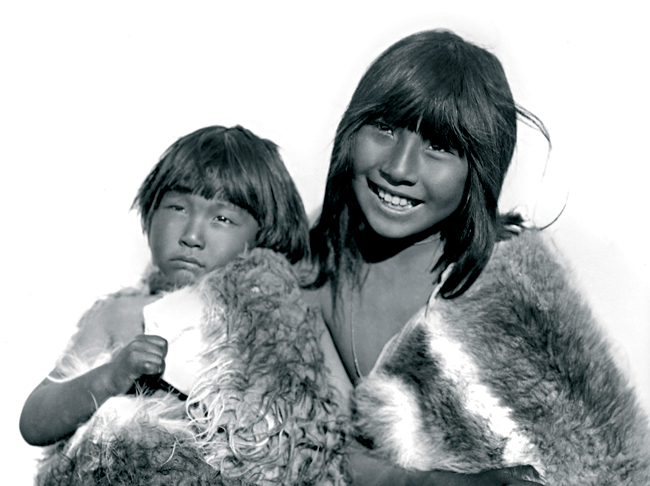
- Selkʼnam children, 1898

Regions with significant populations
- Chile: 1,392 (2024)
- Argentina: 1,206 (2022)

Languages
- Spanish, formerly Selkʼnam (Ona), One speaker in Chile.

Religion
- Animism, Christianity

Related ethnic groups
- Haush, Tehuelche, Teushen, Puelche

- People: Selkʼnam
- Language: Selkʼnamčan
- Country: Karukinka

The Selkʼnam, also known as the Onawo or Ona people, (Note: According to Lucas Bridges, the people called themselves Selkʼnam ('Shilknum'); the Yahgan people called them Ona. Charles W. Furlong recorded their endonym as Shilkʼeʼnum and Chʼon, the latter of which means 'man'.) are an Indigenous people in the Patagonian region of southern Argentina and Chile, including the Tierra del Fuego islands. They were one of the last native groups in South America to be encountered by migrant Europeans in the late 19th century.

Settlement, gold mining and farming in the region of Tierra del Fuego were followed by the Selknam genocide. In the mid-19th century, there were about 4,000 Selkʼnam; in 1916 Charles W. Furlong estimated there were about 800 Selkʼnam living in Tierra del Fuego; with Walter Gardini stating that by 1919 there were 279, and by 1930 just over 100.

In the 2017 Chilean census 1,144 people declared themselves to be Selkʼnam. However, until 2020, they were considered extinct as a people by the government in Chile, and much of the English language literature.

While the Selkʼnam are closely associated with living in the northeastern area of Tierra del Fuego archipelago, they are believed to have originated as a people on the mainland. Thousands of years ago, they migrated by canoe across the Strait of Magellan. Their territory in the early Holocene probably ranged as far as the Cerro Benítez area of the Cerro Toro mountain range in Chile.

== History ==
Distribution of the pre-Hispanic people in the Southern Patagonia

Traditionally, the Selkʼnam were nomadic people who relied on hunting for survival, though they were also recorded as engaging in occasional fishing during low tides. They dressed sparingly despite the cold climate of Patagonia. They shared Tierra del Fuego with the Haush (Manek'enk), another related nomadic culture who lived in the south-eastern part of the island, and the Yahgan (Yámana), an unrelated group who could be found along the southern coast.

=== Relations with Europeans ===
In late 1599, a small Dutch fleet led by Olivier van Noort entered the Strait of Magellan and had a hostile encounter with Selkʼnam which left about forty Selkʼnam dead. It was the bloodiest recorded event in the strait until then.

James Cook described meeting a people in Tierra del Fuego in 1769 that used pieces of glass in their arrowheads. Cook believed the glass had been a gift from the French explorer Louis Antoine de Bougainville, indicating potentially several early contacts. Glass arrowheads became an ever more common occurrence among the Selkʼnam as their interactions with Europeans became more common.

The Selkʼnam had little contact with ethnic Europeans until settlers arrived in the late 19th century. These newcomers developed a great part of the land of Tierra del Fuego as large estancias (ranches), depriving the natives of their ancestral hunting areas. The Selkʼnam, who did not have a concept of private property, considered the sheep herds to be game and hunted the sheep. The ranch owners regarded this as poaching, and paid armed groups or militia to hunt down and kill the Selkʼnam, in what is now called the Selknam genocide.

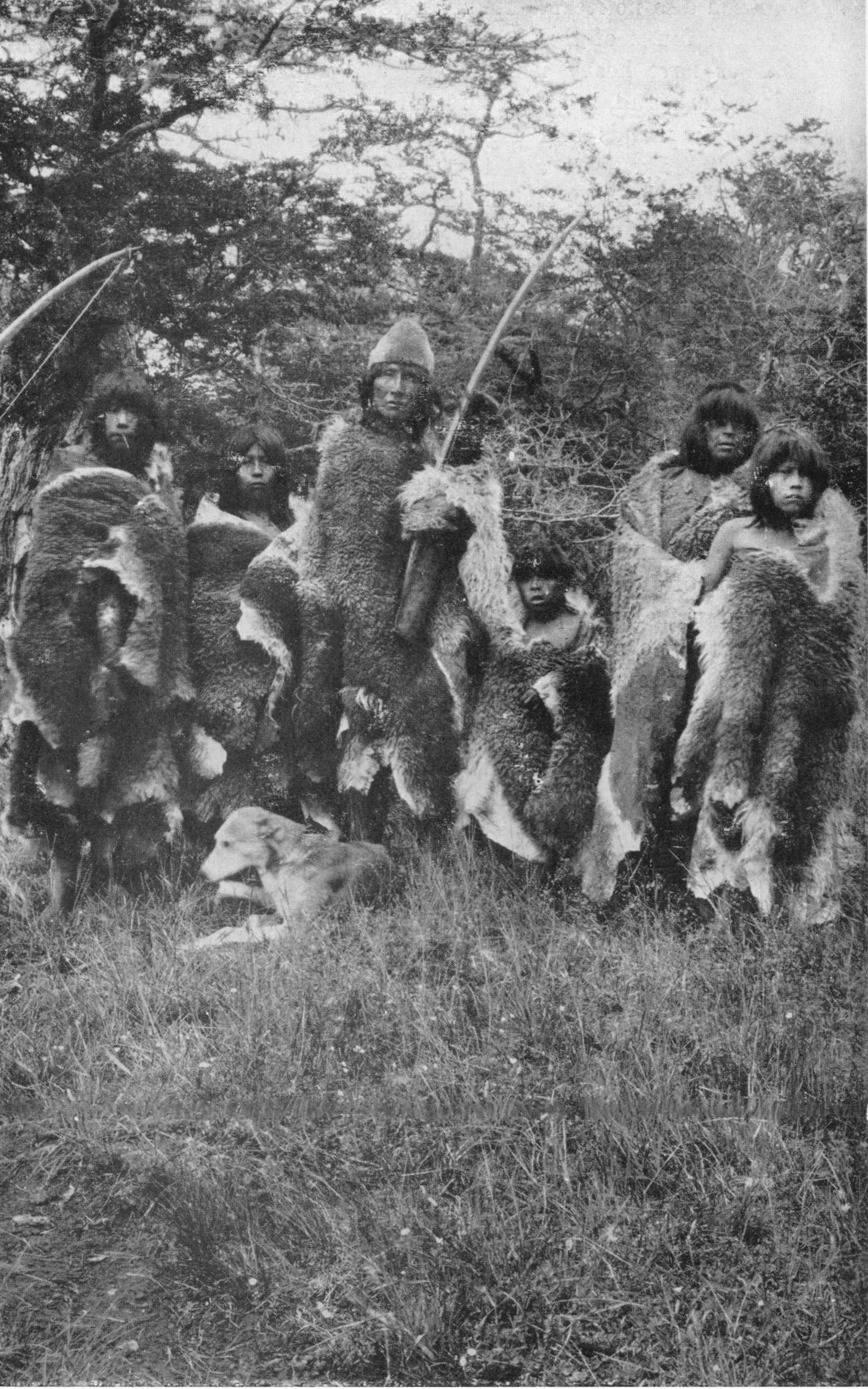
Selkʼnam people

Salesian missionaries worked to protect and preserve Selkʼnam culture. Father José María Beauvoir explored the region and studied the native Patagonian cultures and languages between 1881 and 1924. He compiled a 4,000-word vocabulary of the Selkʼnam language, and 1,400 phrases and sentences, which was published in 1915. He included a comparative list of 150 Selkʼnam-Tehuelche words, as he believed that there were connections to the Tehuelche people and language to the north. German anthropologist Robert Lehmann-Nitsche published the first scholarly studies of the Selkʼnam, although he was later criticised for having studied members of the Selkʼnam people who had been abducted and were exhibited in circuses.

A common comment about the Selkʼnam from Europeans was on their height, where in early records they were recorded as "giants", with the ethnographer Frederick Cook writing in 1897–1899 that their average height was six foot, with instances of individuals six and a half foot tall.

Relations with Europeans in the Beagle Channel area in the southern area of the island of Tierra del Fuego were somewhat more cordial than with the ranchers. Thomas Bridges, who had been an Anglican missionary at Ushuaia, retired from that service. He was given a large land grant by the Argentine government, where he founded Estancia Harberton. Lucas Bridges, one of his three sons, did much to help the local cultures. Like his father, he learned the languages of the various groups and tried to provide the natives with some space in which to live their customary lives as "lords of their own land." However the forces of change were against the Indigenous tribes, who continued to have high fatality rates as their cultures were disrupted. Lucas Bridges' book, Uttermost Part of the Earth (1948), provides sympathetic insight into the lives of the Selkʼnam and Yahgan. In recording the stories of a multitude of Europeans living in Tierra del Fuego, the journalist John Randolph Spears wrote that:

It is plain that the Ona is an aggressive warrior toward the whites only because of ill-treatment. […] Damnable ill-treatment on the part of the whites is at the bottom of all the Ona aggressiveness – and Ona suffering.

— John Randolph Spears, 1895

=== Selknam genocide ===
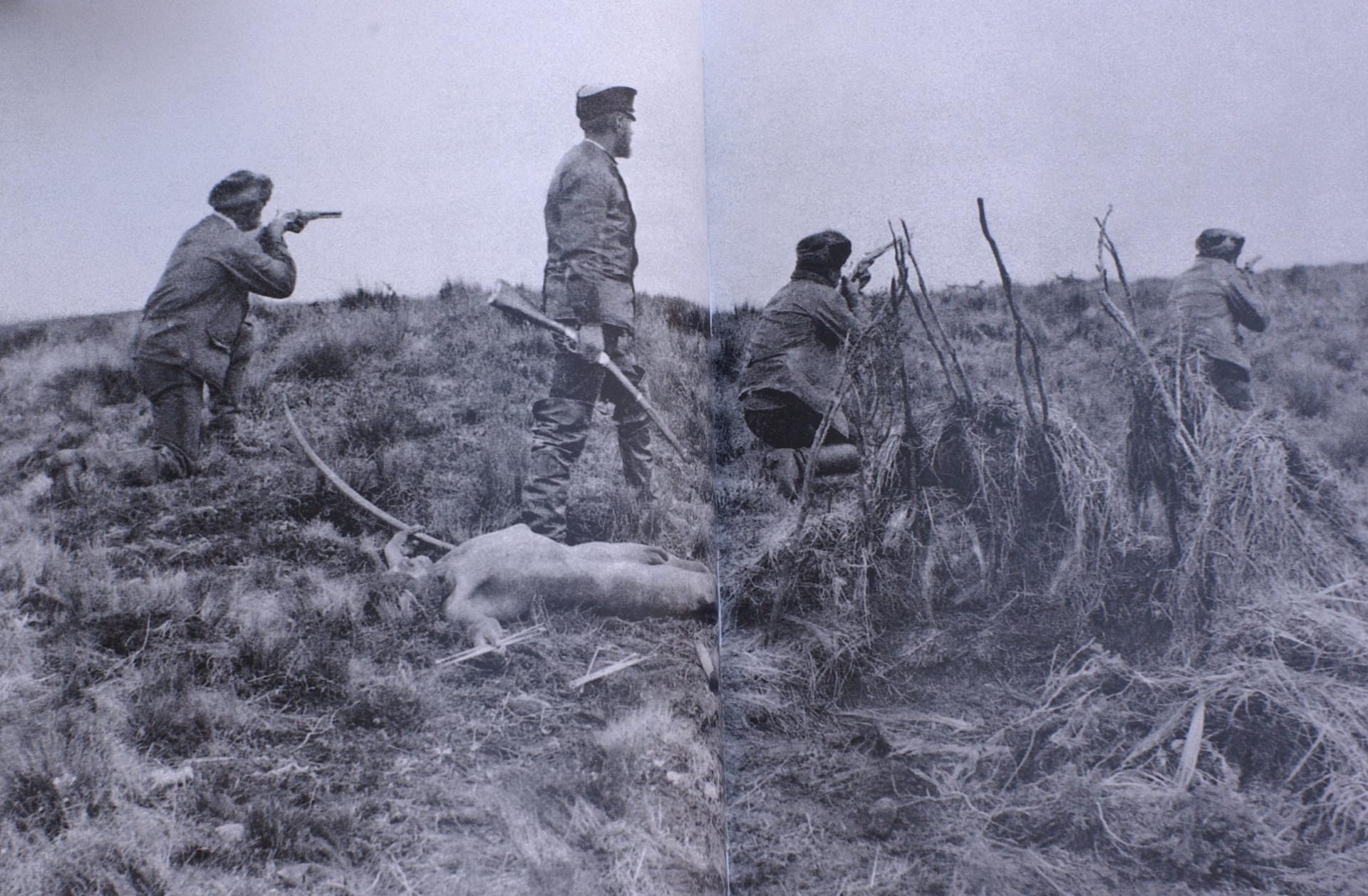
Julius Popper during a manhunt of the Selkʼnam people. In the late 19th century estancieros and gold prospectors launched a campaign of extermination against the Indigenous peoples of Tierra del Fuego.

The Selknam genocide was the genocide of the Selkʼnam people from the second half of the 19th to the early 20th century. The genocide spanned a period of between ten and fifteen years. The Selkʼnam had an estimated population of 4,000 people around the 1880s but saw their numbers reduced to 500 by the early 1900s.

In 1879, the presence of significant gold deposits in the sands of the main rivers of Tierra del Fuego were reported. Hundreds of prospectors and foreign newcomers came to the island in search of fortune, conflicting with the Indigenous population. However, resources of the metal depleted rapidly.

Ranching became the center of controversy in the Magellanic colony. The authorities were aware of the Indigenous group's plight, but sided with the ranchers' cause over the Selkʼnam, who were excluded from their worldview based on "progress" and "civilization." Ranchers typically exercised their own judgement, including the financing of violent campaigns. Considerable numbers of foreign men were hired, and quantities of arms were imported for these campaigns, with the goal of eliminating the Selkʼnam, who were perceived as a major obstacle to the success of settlers' investments. Farm employees later confirmed the routine nature of such campaigns.

The shareholders of the Company for the Exploitation of Tierra del Fuego (Spanish: Sociedad Explotadora de Tierra del Fuego) strove to hide their actions towards native tribes from the public. This was both a means for the company to avoid scrutiny and a strategy to lower its controversial profile. Special attention was paid to these events after the intervention of the Salesian missionaries, who condemned the actions of the ranchers while themselves unintentionally contributing to the extermination of native cultures.

Beginning in the 1890s, the situation of the Selkʼnam became severe. As the territories of the north began to be largely occupied by farms and ranches, many Indigenous people, beset by hunger and persecuted by colonists, started to flee towards the extreme south of the island. This region was already inhabited by Indigenous groups who had a strong sense of ownership over the land. Consequently, the fights for control of territory intensified.

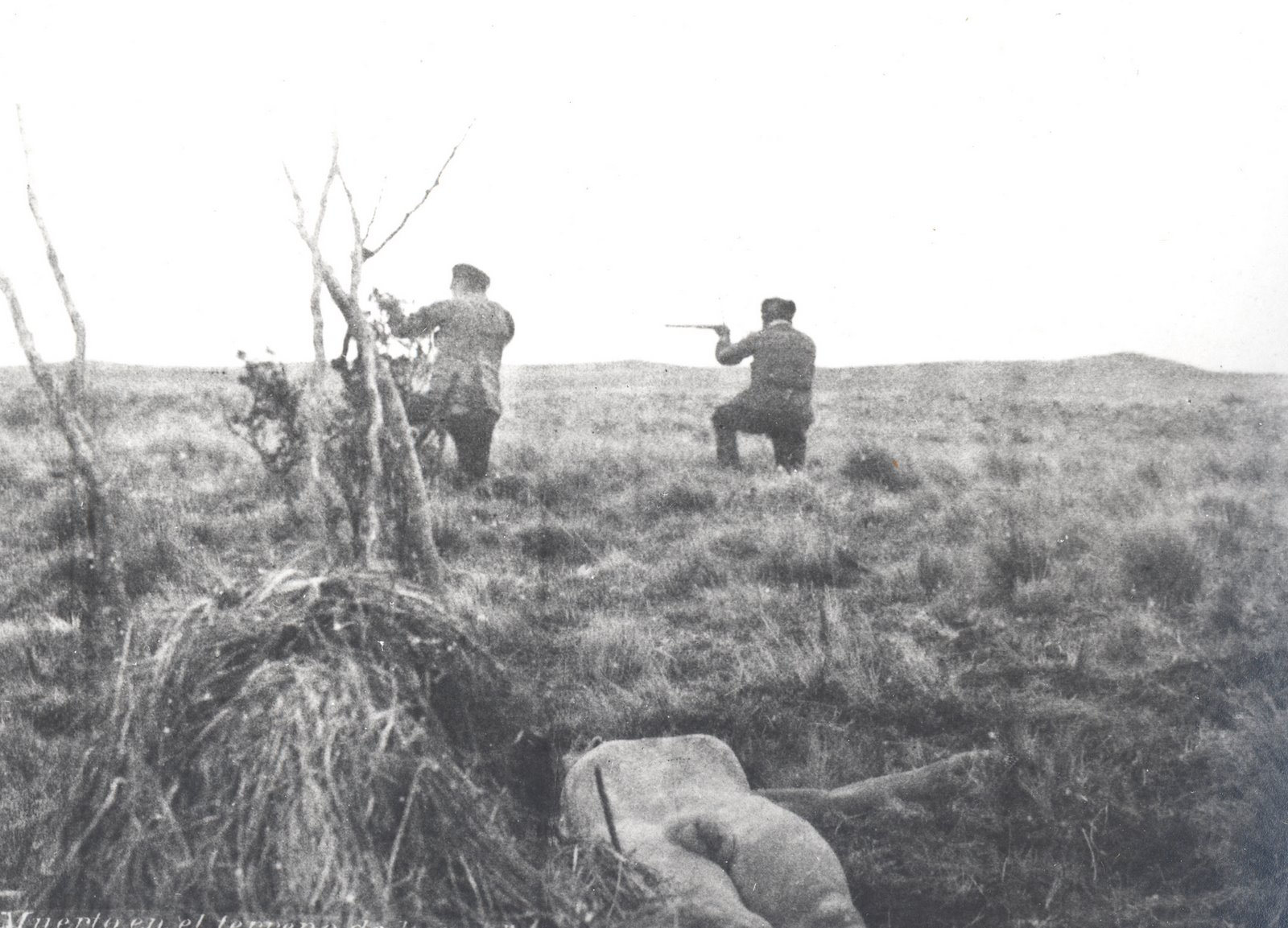
Julius Popper (on left) shooting, with a Selkʼnam corpse visible in the foreground

The large ranchers tried to drive out the Selkʼnam, then began a campaign of extermination against them, with the complicity of the Argentine and Chilean governments. Large companies paid sheep farmers or militia a bounty for each Selkʼnam dead, which was confirmed by the presentation of a pair of hands or ears or, later, a complete skull. They were given more for the death of a woman than a man. The predicament of the Selkʼnam worsened with the establishment of religious missions, which disrupted their livelihood through forcible relocation, and inadvertently brought with them deadly epidemics.

Repression against the Selkʼnam persisted into the early twentieth century. Chile moved most of the Selkʼnam in their territory to Dawson Island in the mid-1890s, confining them to a Salesian mission. Argentina finally allowed Salesian missionaries to aid the Selkʼnam and attempt to assimilate them, with their traditional culture and livelihoods then completely interrupted.

Later conflicts between governor Manuel Señoret and the head of the Salesian mission José Fagnano only served to worsen, rather than improve, conditions for the Selkʼnam. Long disputes between civil authorities and priests did not allow a satisfactory solution to the Indigenous issue. Governor Señoret favored the ranchers' cause, and took little interest in the incidents that took place in Tierra del Fuego.

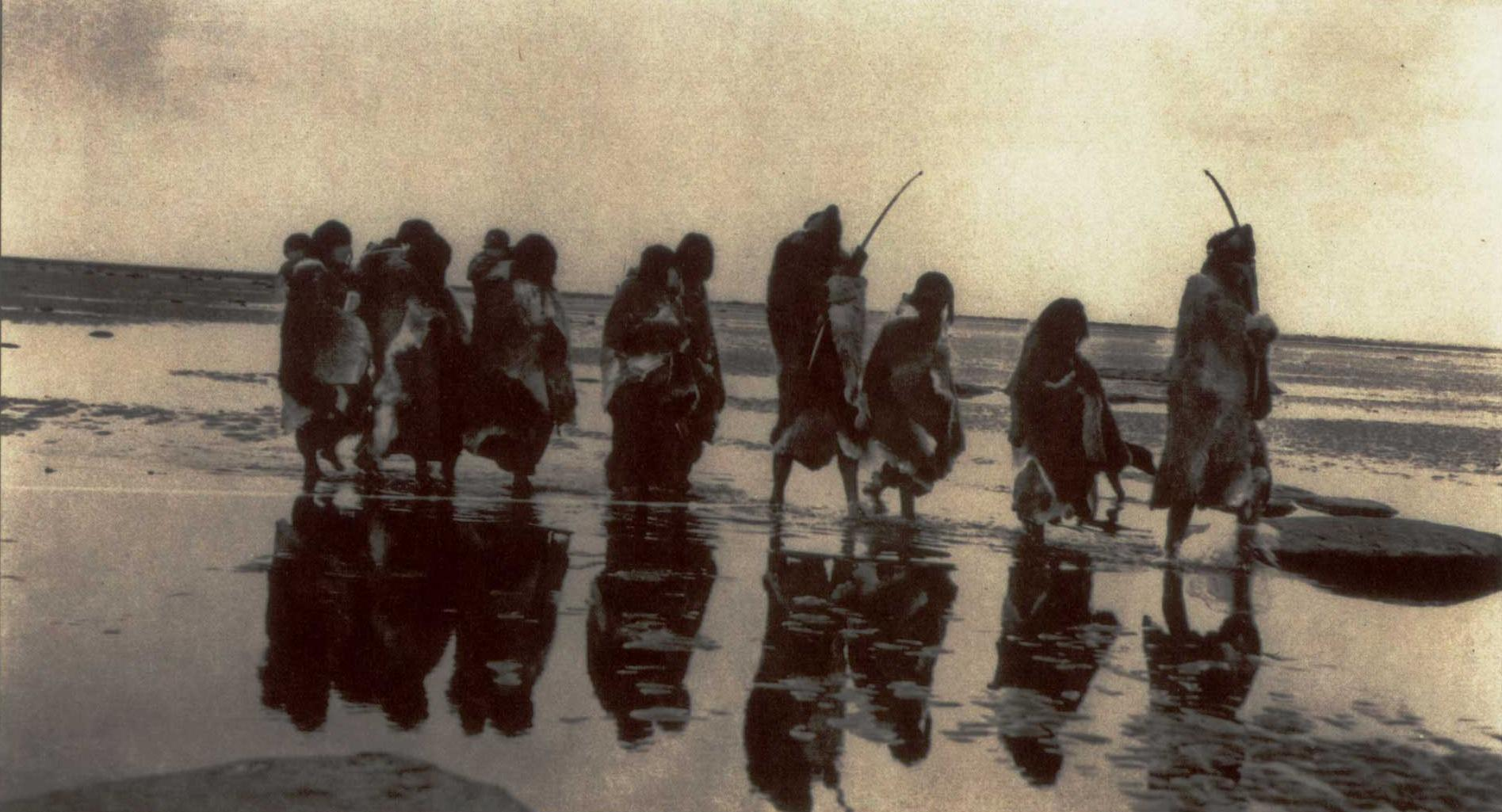
Selkʼnam people in 1930

Two Christian missions were established to preach to the Selkʼnam. They were intended to provide housing and food for the natives, but closed due to the small number of Selkʼnam remaining; they had numbered in the thousands before Western colonization, but by the early twentieth century only a few hundred remained.

Alejandro Cañas estimated that in 1896 there was a population of 3,000 Selkʼnam. Martín Gusinde, an Austrian priest and ethnologist who studied them in the early 20th century, wrote in 1919 that only 279 Selkʼnam remained. In 1945 the Salesian missionary, Lorenzo Massa, counted 25.

Anthropologist Anne Chapman worked with two women whose parents were both Selkʼnam and had lived tribally in their childhood, Ángela Loij and Lola Kiepja. She considered the Selk'nam to be extinct after May 1974, when Ángela Loji died. Virginia Choquintel, a woman with Selkʼnam parents who lived in the Salesian mission and was unaware of her indigenous identity, died in 1999; the press referred to her as "the last Selkʼnam". This rhetoric has been criticized as representing mixed Selkʼnam as not truly indigenous, and denying their existence and need for political and legal recognition.

=== Current status ===
First flag created by women and children survivors at the Dawson Salesian mission, early 1900s. Also later adopted by the Corporación Selkʼnam in Chile.

Flag used by the Telkacher Chilean Selkʼnam community.

Comunidad Rafaela Ishton was formed in the 1980s to fight for recognition and the rights of Selkʼnam in Argentina, and in 1994 were recognised as an Indigenous people by the government. In 1998, the provincial Legislature of Tierra del Fuego recognised a treaty signed in 1925 between the president of Argentina, Marcelo Torcuato de Alvear, and the Selkʼnam people. Law 405 restored 35,000 hectares of 45,000 designated in the treaty to the Selkʼnam people, with the remaining 10,000 hectares retained for the future establishment of the municipality of Tolhuin.

The 2010 National Population Census in Argentina revealed the existence of 2,761 people who recognised themselves as Selkʼnam throughout the country, 294 of them in the province of Tierra del Fuego, Antarctica and South Atlantic Islands.

In the 2017 Chilean census 1,144 people declared themselves to be Selkʼnam. The descendants of the previously considered extinct Selkʼnam people are in the process of cultural reappropriation and recreation and do not consider themselves or their people as extinct. The Corporación Selkʼnam campaigned for an amendment to Indigenous Law 19.253, and on 27 June 2020 the Chamber of Deputies of Chile adjusted the law, recognizing the Selkʼnam as one of the Indigenous peoples of Chile. Then on 5 September 2023 the National Congress of Chile recognised the Selk’nam as one of the 11 original peoples of Chile, accepting them as a living community of Chile. Members of parliament issued a statement declaring their regret over the role the Chilean and Argentinean states played in the massacres of Indigenous people.

== Culture and religion ==
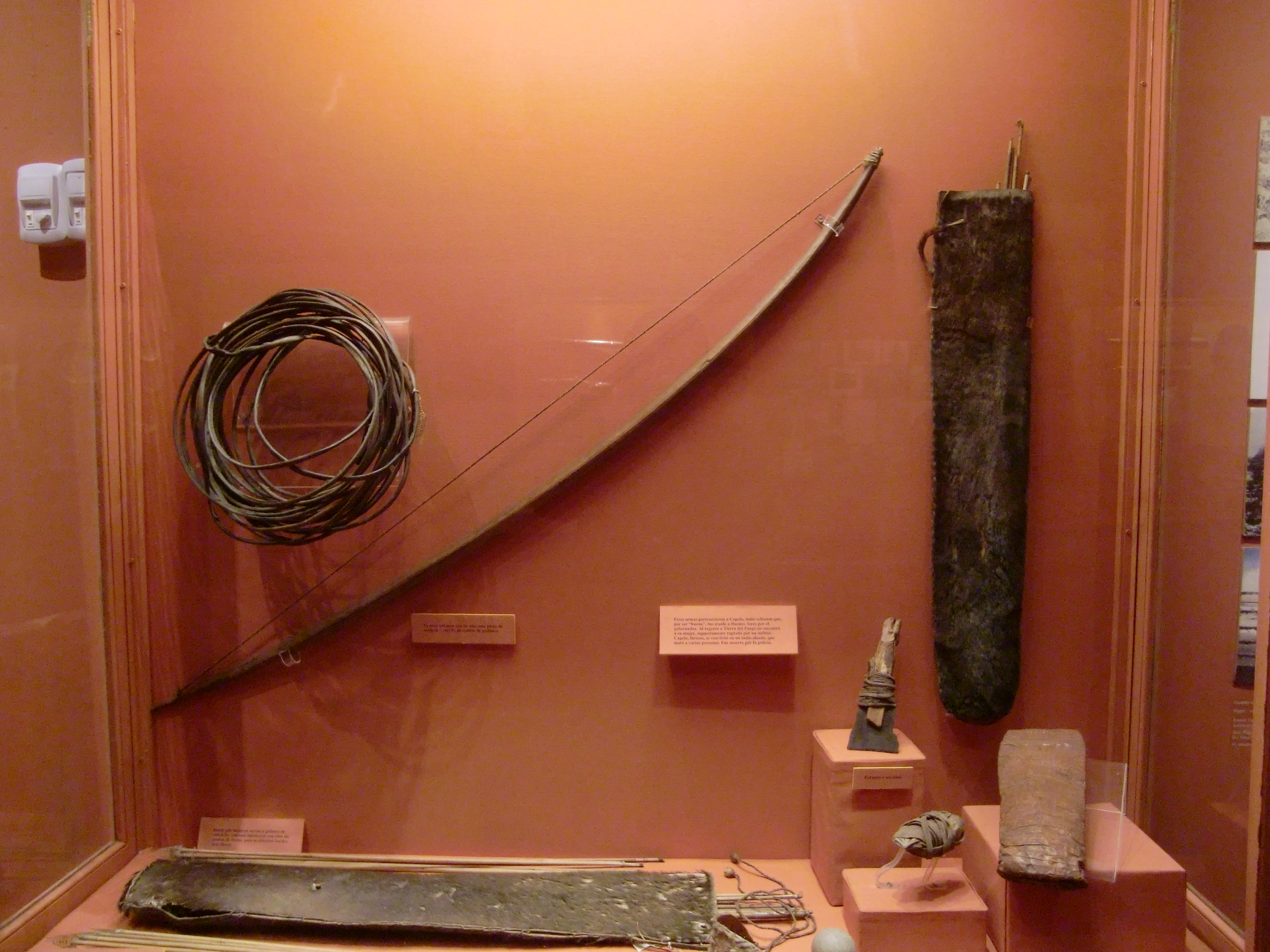
Bow and arrows.

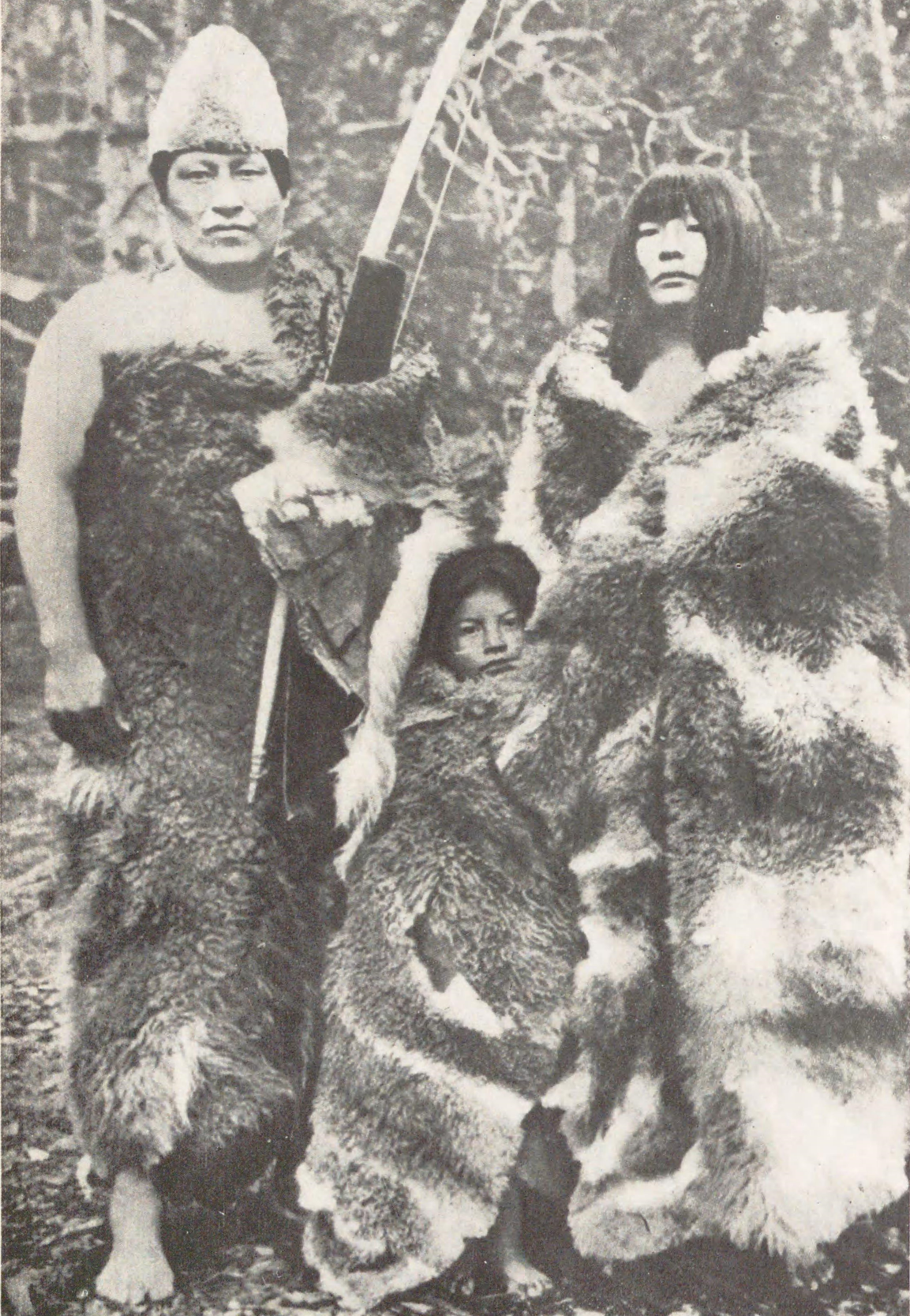
Selkʼnam family

The missions and early 20th-century anthropologists collected information about Selkʼnam culture, religion and traditions while trying to help them preserve their culture.

=== Hunting and diet ===
A large part of the traditional diet of Selkʼnam according to early accounts, was made of the guanaco which they hunted using bows and arrows as well as with bolas. The guanaco of Tierra del Fuego were recorded as being larger than their Patagonian counterparts. The hide of the guanaco hunted by Selkʼnam were then used in the construction of shelters, bags, and clothing. The Selkʼnam were also known to engage in fishing during low tides using spears, where the majority of seafood procured were eels, though more rarely caught seafood such as róbalos were more valued. In the south of the island birds made up a portion of the Selkʼnam diet. Later research has brought the proportionality of food resources in these early accounts into question.

The Selkʼnam were also known to employ the Fuegian dog, a domesticated form of the culpeo, in hunting efforts. While Julius Popper did not observe the dogs being of use in hunts, Antonio Coiazzi did record their use in hunting and this has been supported by later research. All sources agree that the dogs also provided a source of warmth in shelters as they would arrange themselves to sleep tightly against and around the Selkʼnam.

=== Language ===
The Selkʼnam spoke the Selkʼnam language of the Chon language family. Missionary José María Beauvoir compiled a dictionary of the Selkʼnam language. One source states that the last fluent native speakers died in the 1980s.

=== Body decoration ===
For special occasions, such as initiation ceremonies, weddings, and funerals, Selkʼnam would decorate their bodies with paint, especially their faces. The main colors employed in decoration are red, black, and white.

=== Religion ===
Selkʼnam religion was a complex system of beliefs, with a creation myth. Temáukel was the name of the great supernatural entity who they believed kept the world order. The creator deity of the world was called Kénos or Quénos.

The Selkʼnam had individuals who took shaman-like roles. Such a xon ([xon]) had supernatural capabilities, e.g. to control weather.

=== Initiation ceremonies ===
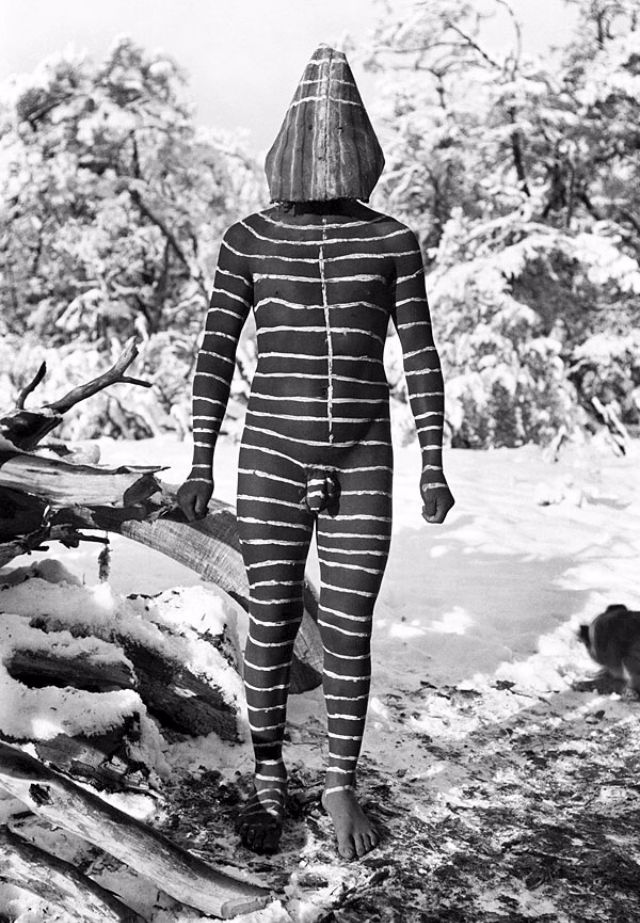
Male painted for initiation rite of Selkʼnam people

The Selkʼnam male initiation ceremony, the passage to adulthood, was called Hain. Nearby Indigenous peoples, the Yahgan and Haush, had similar initiation ceremonies.

Young males were called to a dark hut. There they would be attacked by "spirits", who were men dressed as supernatural beings. Children were taught to believe in and fear these spirits during childhood and were threatened by them in case they misbehaved. The boys' task in this rite of passage was to unmask the spirits; when the boys saw that the spirits were human, they were told a story of world creation related to the sun and moon. In a related story, they were told that in the past women used to be disguised as spirits to control men. When the men discovered the masquerade, they, in turn, would threaten women as spirits. According to the men, the women never learned that the masked men were not truly spirits, but the males found out at the initiation rite.

The contemporary ceremonies used this interplay in somewhat of a joking way. After the first day, related ceremonies and rituals took place. Males showed their strength in front of women by fighting spirits (who were other men but the women supposedly did not know it) in some theatrical fights. Each spirit was played with traditional actions, words and gestures, so that everyone could identify it. The best spirit actors from previous Hains were called again to impersonate spirits in later Hains.

Apart from these dramatic re-enactments of mythic events, the Hain involved tests for young males for courage, resourcefulness, resisting temptation, resisting pain and overcoming fear. It also included prolonged instructional courses to train the young men in the tasks for which they would be responsible.

Before European encounter, the various rites of the Hain lasted a very long time, perhaps even a year on occasion. It would end with the last fight against the "worst" spirit. Usually Hains were started when there was enough food (for example a whale was washed onto the coast), a time when all the Selkʼnam from all the groups would gather at one place, in male and female camps. "Spirits" sometimes went to female encampments to scare them, as well as moving around and acting in ways that related to their characters.

The last Hain was held in one of the missions in the early 20th century, and was photographed by missionary Martin Gusinde. It was a shorter and smaller ceremony than used to be held. The photographs show the "spirit" costumes the Selkʼnam created and wore. Gusinde's The Lost Tribes of Tierra Del Fuego (2015) was published in English by Thames & Hudson, and in French and Spanish by Éditions Xavier Barral.

=== Marriage and mourning traditions ===
Beyond decorating the faces of the individuals marrying, another tradition observed by Gusinde among the Selkʼnam was related to marriage proposals, where a man would have a bow made and silently present it to the woman he wished to marry in front of the elders of her family.

After the death of an individual, it was the duty of their family to light a large fire and engage in singing and dancing. The individual would then be wrapped in a guanaco cape, and buried as soon as possible. There was also a tradition of specifically burying individuals in the hollows or roots of trees, and making sure the deceased could not be seen once they had been placed there. There is no tradition of grave goods.

== Heritage ==
Photographs of Selkʼnam people taken by the missionaries are displayed at the Martin Gusinde Anthropological Museum in Puerto Williams. There are also a few books on the subject, including Selkʼnam tales, collected by the missions, and a dictionary of the Selkʼnam (Ona) language. Due to early contact by missionaries, much more information was collected about the Selkʼnam people than about other people of the region.

Austrian priest and ethnologist Gusinde tried also to collect information about other local people, but he found their numbers much reduced. He was able to write more about traditional Selkʼnam culture because it was still being lived by the Selkʼnam people into the 20th century.

As of 2023, the ancestral remains of 14 Selkʼnam individuals are kept in the collection of the Natural History Museum Vienna.

== Famous individuals ==
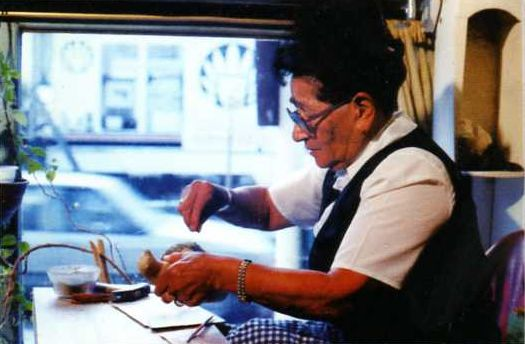
Enriqueta Gastelumendi, working on a carving in her home in Ushuaia

Ángela Loij (1900–1974) is considered to have been the last Selkʼnam of non-mixed ancestry, a school was named in her honour in Río Grande, Tierra del Fuego. Her grand-niece Amalia Gudiño was elected as a deputy in the Argentine Chamber of Deputies in 1995, becoming the first Indigenous person to serve as a deputy in Argentina. Enriqueta Gastelumendi (1913–2004) was an artisanal carver from Tierra del Fuego, Argentina. The daughter of a Selkʼnam mother and a Basque father, she won awards for her artistic works detailing life in Tierra del Fuego.

== See also ==
- Kawésqar
- Kawésqar language
