= Estancia Moat =

Coordinates: 54°58′32.4″S 66°44′41″W

Estancia Moat is a large farm in southern Isla Grande de Tierra del Fuego facing Beagle Channel. It is the southernmost cattle farm in the World. Estancia moat is connected by road to Estancia Harberton and Ushuaia.
