= Harberton =

Village in Devon, England

Coordinates: 50.4136°N 3.7217°W

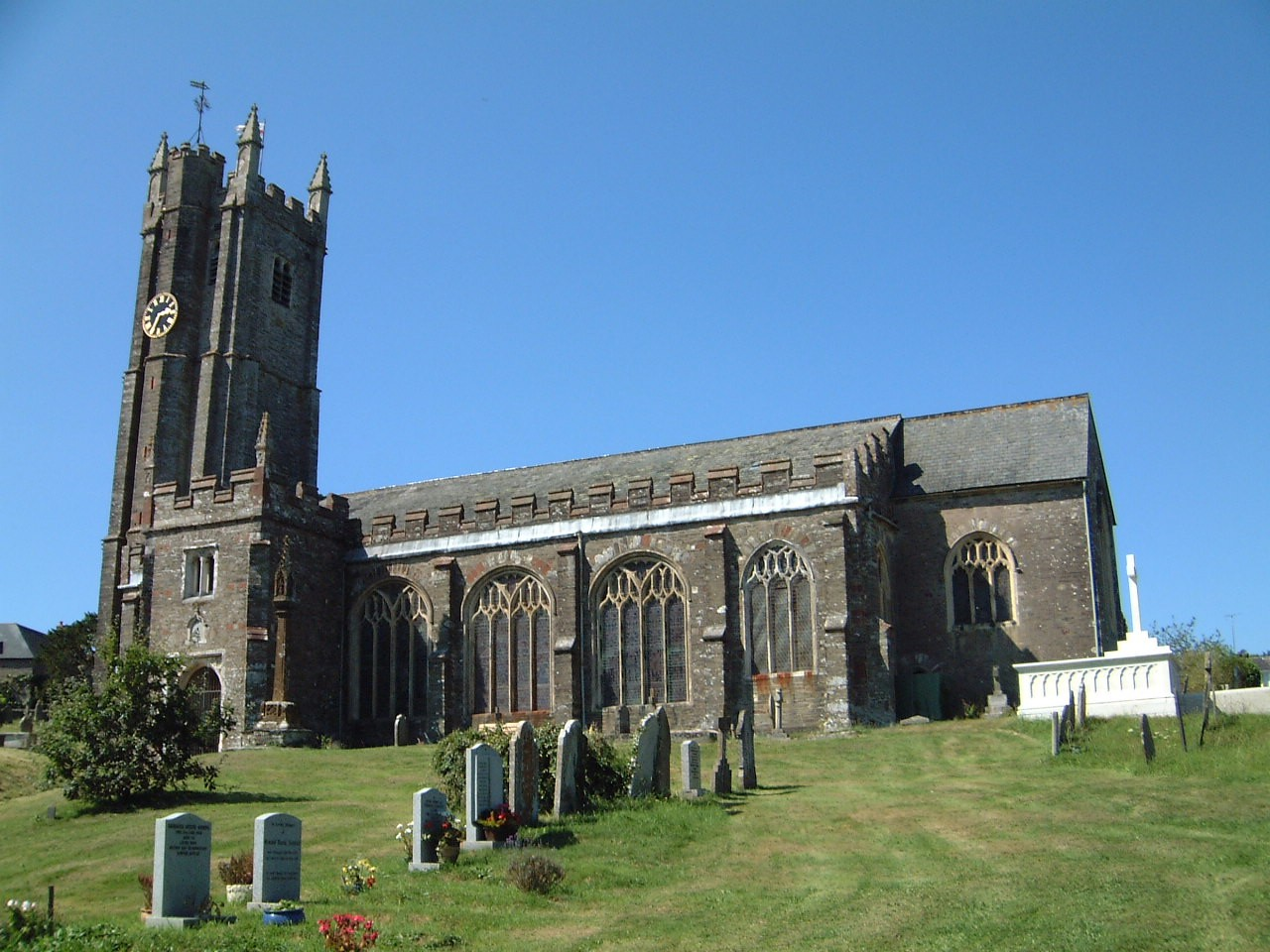
- St Andrew's Church, Harberton

- Location within Devon
- Population: 1,285
- OS grid reference: SX777585
- Civil parish: Harberton
- District: South Hams
- Shire county: Devon
- Region: South West
- Country: England
- Sovereign state: United Kingdom
- Post town: TOTNES
- Postcode district: TQ9
- Police: Devon and Cornwall
- Fire: Devon and Somerset
- Ambulance: South Western

Harberton is a village, civil parish and former manor 3 miles south west of Totnes, in the South Hams District of Devon, England. The parish includes the village of Harbertonford situated on the main A381 road. In the 2001 census the parish had a population of 1,285. The village is a major part of the electoral ward of Avon and Harbourne. At the 2011 census the ward population was 2,217.

== Etymology ==
The village takes its name from the River Harbourne, which flows through the parish.

== Church of St Andrew ==
The Parish Church of St Andrew is a fine building of the 14th to 15th centuries with a handsome tower. The late medieval rood screen is a notable example with richly carved cornice and vaulting. The font is a very fine piece of Norman work and the pulpit is 15th century.

== Harberton Croquet and Social Club (HCSC) ==
Harberton is home to the Harberton Croquet and Social Club, which was founded in 2002 and hosts the popular Summer Cup. This is the only club in the country that plays by Harberton Croquet Rules, rather than the more commonly played variations of croquet rules.

== Harberton, Tierra del Fuego ==
Harberton was the home of Mary Ann Varder (1842–1922), who married Thomas Bridges on 7 August 1869 and moved with him in 1871 to Tierra del Fuego, the southern tip of Argentina, overlooking the Beagle Channel. There they established an estancia in 1886, which they named Harberton after Mary's birthplace.

== History ==
=== Anglo-Saxons ===
According to Risdon (d.1640), Harberton was the residence of Alric the Saxon.

=== Normans ===
Harberton was one of twelve feudal baronies in Devonshire said to have existed according to Pole (d.1635). It was not however recognised as such in the 1960 work by Sanders, English Baronies.

==== Domesday Book ====
Harberton is not mentioned in the Domesday Book of 1086, as it was then a constituent estate of the manor of Chillington, which is listed.

==== Bigod ====
According to Risdon (d.1640), Roger le Bigod (d. 1107), was seized of lands in Harberton.

==== de Nonant ====
Arms of de Nonant (adopted at start of the Age of Heraldry (c.1200-1215): Argent, a lion rampant gules

- Roger I de Nonant (d.pre-1123). The estate of Harberton was granted out of the royal manor of Chillington (in the parish of Stockenham) by King Henry I (1100–1135) to Roger I de Nonant (d.pre-1123), feudal baron of Totnes
- Guy de Nonant (d. pre-1141)
- Roger II de Nonant (d.circa 1177), a supporter of Empress Maud.
- Henry de Nonant (d.1206).
- Roger III de Nonant, who married a certain Alice, but without consent of King John (1199–1216), who seized his barony of Totnes back into crown lands.

==== de Vautort ====
Arms of de Vautort family, feudal barons of Trematon, Cornwall, and feudal barons of Harberton, Devon: Argent, three bends gules a bordure sable bezantée. A bordure bezantée is a feature in the arms of many families which held under the overlordship of the Earls of Cornwall

The feudal barony of Harberton was granted to the de Vautort family, feudal barons of Trematon, Cornwall. Surviving sources (i.e. Pole, Risdon and Sanders) confuse between themselves the names Roger, Reginald and Ralph de Vautort, leading to disparate and irreconcilable accounts of the true descent of the family. All accounts however agree that it was held for several generations by this family, which died out in the male line in the 13th century.

== Notable residents ==
John Huxham, the surgeon and doctor, was born here in 1672.
