= Estancia Harberton =

Land in Tierra del Fuego, Argentina

Coordinates: 54.87820°S 67.32861°W

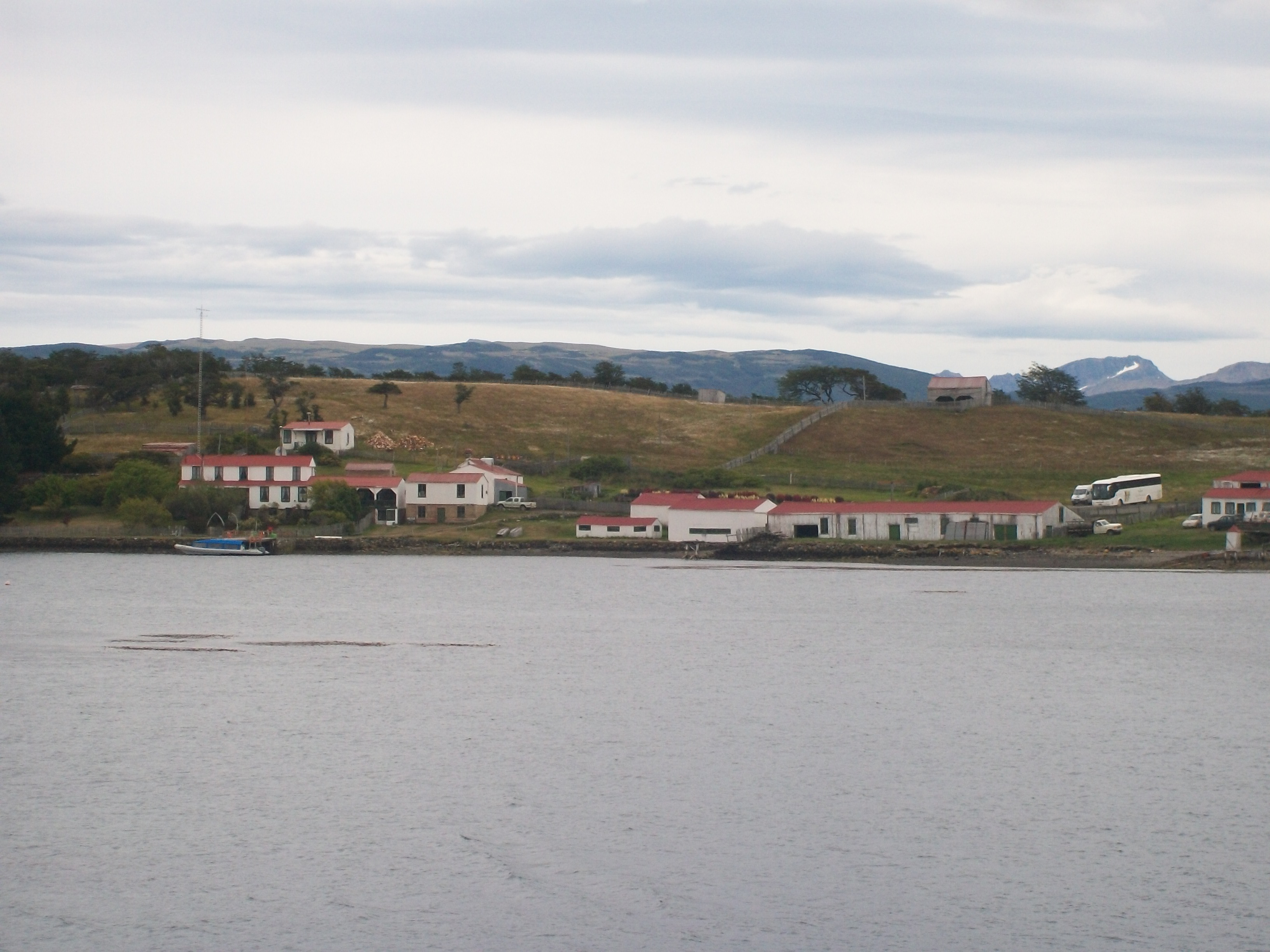
Estancia Harberton.

Location of Estancia Haberton in Tierra del Fuego.

Estancia Harberton was established in 1886, when the missionary pioneer Thomas Bridges (1842-1898) resigned from the Anglican mission at Ushuaia. The estancia was named for Harberton, the home of his wife, Mary Ann Varder (1842-1922), in Devon, England. Bridges was the author of a dictionary of the Yámana or Yaghan language, and their son Lucas Bridges (1874-1949) wrote The Uttermost Part of the Earth about his boyhood, the Yahgan people, and the family's adventures in getting the dictionary published in Europe.

Harberton's present manager and part-owner, Tommy Goodall (born 1933), is Thomas Bridges's 4th-great grandson. Though the Bridges surname has been daughtered out, there is a Thomas in every generation. He managed the estancia with his wife, American biologist Rae Natalie Prosser de Goodall, until her death in 2015. He continues to manage the estancia with help from their daughter and her children. The principal enterprise in the 21st century is tourism. Visitors can tour the grounds, outbuildings, gardens, cemetery, and a botanical garden with replica Yahgan huts. Nearby is the Museo Acatushún de Aves y Mamíferos Marinos Australes of the natural history of the region's marine mammals and birds. It is also possible to visit Magellanic penguin rookeries at Isla Martillo not far away. Overnight guests can rent a room in the remodeled cookhouse or, with permission, camp on the grounds. Meals are available at the dining room and shop in the main complex of buildings.

The season runs from October to April. There are regular bus and van tours from Ushuaia, 85 km to the west via paved and gravel roads. To the east, Estancia Harberton is connected to Estancia Moat by road.
