= Lucas Bridges =

Argentine author, explorer, and rancher (1874 – 1949)

Esteban Lucas Bridges
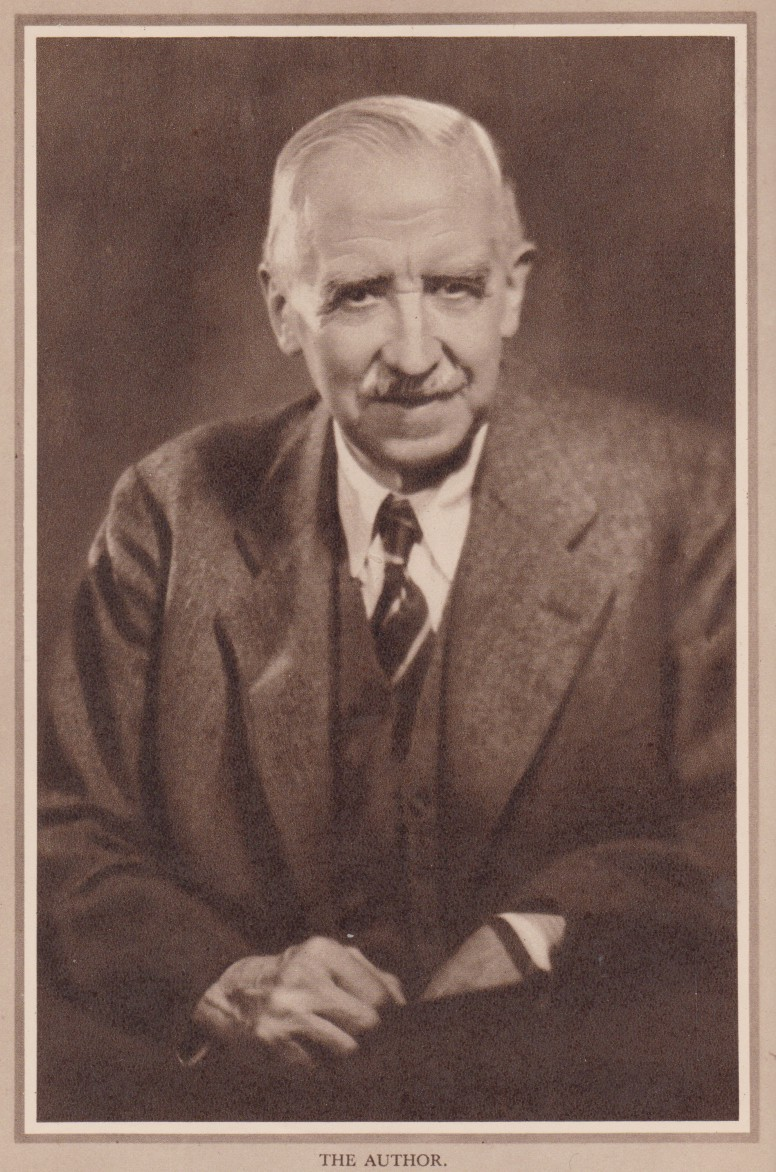
- Bridges in 1948
- Born: 31 December 1874; Ushuaia
- Died: 4 April 1949 (aged 74); Buenos Aires
- Occupation: Author
- Parents: Thomas Bridges; Mary Ann Bridges
- Writing career
- Notable work: The Uttermost Part of the Earth

Esteban Lucas Bridges was an Argentine author, explorer, and rancher of English descent. After fighting for the British during the First World War, he married and moved with his wife to South Africa, where they developed a ranch with her brother.

Bridges was the third child of six and second son of an Anglican missionary, the Reverend Thomas Bridges, (1842–98) and "the third white native of Ushuaia" (his elder brother, born in 1872, having been the first) in Tierra del Fuego, Argentina, at the southernmost tip of South America.

Bridges wrote Uttermost Part of the Earth (1948) about his family's experiences in Tierra del Fuego, the Yahgan and Selkʼnam indigenous peoples, and the effects on them of colonization by Europeans. The book was well reviewed, Madaline W. Nichols describing it as "fascinating" and "of basic ethnological importance".

== Early life and education ==
Stephen Lucas Bridges, also called Esteban and going by Lucas, was born to Thomas and Mary Ann Bridges in Ushuaia, Tierra del Fuego. The third of six children and the second of three sons, he grew up speaking English, Yahgan, and Selkʼnam. Thomas Bridges was an Anglican missionary who ministered to the indigenous Yahgan and Selkʼnam peoples, and the first foreigner to establish a permanent outpost in the Usi Yagán, or Yaghan country, in the area currently known as Beagle channel.

Lucas Bridges learned the languages and cultures of both tribes from a young age. He was the only European to be made a blood brother of the Selkʼnam and was invited to witness their council. He also compiled a vocabulary of the Haush or Manek'enk, a small indigenous tribe who lived to the east of the Selkʼnam, at the end of Mitre Peninsula.

Bridges witnessed the effects of change as immigrants from European cultures flooded the area, beginning in the late 19th century. There were gold and sheep booms in the region, attracting many new immigrants. The indigenous peoples were decimated. Eurasian infectious diseases such as measles caused high fatality rates. Outbreaks in 1884 (following a visit by three Argentine Navy ships), 1924 and 1929 became fatal epidemics for the indigenous peoples, with devastating results.

In 1886 Thomas Bridges resigned his position as a missionary; Lucas helped his father to create the Estancia Harberton (named after his mother's hometown in England), a sheep farming ranch, in a sheltered bay on the coast of the Beagle Channel. The location was a Yahgan safe port.

== Exploration ==
In 1898 Lucas Bridges opened a trail north from Estancia Harberton to the east end of Lago Fagnano, where the land was better for rearing sheep. It has been improved as a hiking trail known as the Lucas Bridges Trail.

In 1902 Lucas and his brothers Despard and Will founded Estancia Viamonte in the northern part of Tierra del Fuego. The new trail was used to transport sheep between the two estancias. The Selkʼnam people had asked for their help in finding a place of shelter from some of the pressures they were under. The Bridges family provided them with areas on their estancias where they could live in semi-traditional ways. Lucas Bridges became the main informant for almost every traveler, national explorer or international anthropologist in the area, and was quoted in most reports on the indigenous peoples of Tierra del Fuego. Descendants of the brothers continue to live and work at the estancias.

== First World War and emigration ==
Bridges went to England to enlist in the Army at the outbreak of the First World War. In 1917 he married Jannette McLeod Jardine (1890-1976). After the war the couple moved to South Africa, where he developed a ranch with his brother-in-law. He and his wife raised their family there.

Bridges returned to Argentina much later, to live out his last years and where he wrote Uttermost Part of the Earth. He died in Buenos Aires in 1949 aged 74, and was buried next to his father in the British Cemetery at Chacarita, Buenos Aires.

== Sources ==
- "Obituary: Lucas Bridges", The Geographical Journal 114 (1949) pp. 240–241.
- Bridges, Lucas, Uttermost Part of the Earth, London: Hodder & Stoughton 1948, New York: E.P. Dutton 1949; London: Century Hutchinson 1987 ISBN 0-7126-1493-1; Overlook Press 2008 ISBN 978-1-58567-956-0
