= David Moore (botanist born 1933) =

British botanist (1933–2013)

David M. Moore
- Born: David Moresby Moore; 26 July 1933; Barnard Castle
- Died: 29 June 2013
- Education: Barnard Castle School
- Alma mater: University College, Durham
- Spouse: Ida Shaw

David Moresby Moore (26 July 1933 – 29 June 2013) was a British botanist who wrote two reference works on Antarctic and sub-Antarctic flora, co-edited a book on Patagonian flora and wrote numerous other books on plant cytogenetics and global flora.

== Early life ==
Moore was born in 1933 in Barnard Castle, County Durham, England. The eldest of 4 brothers, Moore developed an early interest in the natural world as he explored his native Teesdale, an area of the UK which he loved his entire life. He was schooled at Barnard Castle School, and went on to University College, Durham achieving a degree in Biology, where he undertook postgraduate research under David Henriques Valentine in Botany.

== Career ==
Moore spent two years in Australia after his PhD, working as a research officer for the Commonwealth Scientific and Industrial Research Organisation in Canberra. He then spent the following two years as a research fellow at the University of California, Los Angeles. He lectured in botany at the University of Leicester from 1961 to 1968. At Leicester, Moore became involved with the editorial group of the Flora Europaea, which covered all flowering plants and ferns in Europe. Moore was its secretary-general for four years.

It has been said that Moore helped to "lay the groundwork for our understanding of ... the Antarctic Floristic Kingdom". In the early 1960s, Moore embarked on an extensive field study of the Falkland Islands. Amongst his discoveries was a new plant species unique to the islands, Plantago moorei ("Moore's plantain"), which bears his name. His efforts culminated in the publication in 1968 through the British Antarctic Survey of The Vascular Flora of the Falkland Islands – a definitive work in the field.

In 1968, Moore moved to the University of Reading, a leading research and training centre for plant taxonomy and systematics then headed by Professor Vernon Heywood. Whilst there, Moore became interested in the flora of Spain. Moore stayed at Reading up until the end of his career, and in 1976 was promoted to a personal professorship. Moore's knowledge of the Falklands became of strategic importance in 1982, when he advised the British Ministry of Defence on the topography and climate of the islands as the British planned to re-gain the Falkland Islands following the Argentinian invasion. His plant collections and many photographic slides are held in the University of Reading Herbarium.

His specialities were said to be Spermatophytes (also called Phanerogams).

== Personal life ==
David Moore married Ida Shaw in 1957, with whom he had two sons; Wayne, born in 1961, and Lloyd, born in 1969. Upon returning from the USA in 1961, David and Ida resided in Leicester, until 1969, when they moved to Reading. Following his retirement, David Moore continued to travel widely, often accompanied by Ida, and counted the USA, Spain and The Isles of Wight and Man as personal favourites. He continued to support ex-colleagues and students at Reading University and further afield for many years, and remained a singularly erudite and compelling writer until late in life, with a wide range of opinions on current affairs. Later grandchildren expanded Moore's family further, comprising Alexander, Nicholas, Katharine, Adam and Rianna. Ida died in 2022, having been diagnosed with Alzheimers in later life.

== Publications ==
- The Vascular Flora of the Falkland Islands (1968)
- The Vascular Flora of Tierra del Fuego (1983)
- Transecta Botánica de la Patagonia Austral (1985) as co-editor
