= Max Uhle =

German archaeologist (1856–1944)

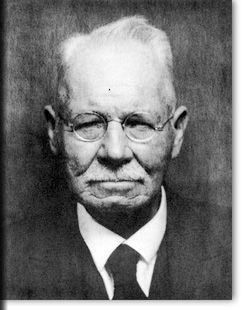
- Born: March 25, 1856; Dresden, Saxony
- Died: May 11, 1944 (age 88); Loeben, Upper Silesia
- Education: University of Leipzig; University of Göttingen
- Known for: Archaeological work in South America
- Spouse: Charlotte Grosse
- Scientific career
- Fields: Archaeology; Ethnology; Linguistics

Friedrich Max Uhle (25 March 1856 – 11 May 1944) was a German archaeologist, whose work in Peru, Chile, Ecuador and Bolivia at the turn of the Twentieth Century had a significant impact on the practice of archaeology of South America.

== Biography ==
Uhle was born in Dresden, Kingdom of Saxony (modern-day Germany), on 25 March 1856 and received his Ph.D. in 1880 from the University of Leipzig. He married Charlotte Grosse from Philadelphia, Pennsylvania, where he worked at the University of Pennsylvania for several years.

Trained as a philologist, Uhle became interested in Peru while a curator at Dresden Museum. In 1888, a close friend, Alphons Stübel, who had recently published an article on the history of Peruvian archaeology, suggested Uhle concentrate his studies on that region. He first traveled to South America in 1892 to initiate research in Argentina and Bolivia for the Konigliches Museum fur Völkerkunde in Berlin, Germany. In that same year he published "The Ruins of Tiahuanaco in the Highlands of Ancient Peru," with photographer and engineer B. von Grumbkow. This extensive work is considered the first in depth scientific account of the ancient site of Tiwanaku, Bolivia.

Uhle returned to South America in 1896, now sponsored by the American Exploration Society in Philadelphia and the University of Pennsylvania Museum of Archaeology and Anthropology. He also enjoyed the patronage of Mrs. Phoebe Hearst, the mother of William Randolph Hearst. He undertook excavations at Pachacamac, near the coast of Peru, and on Mochica and Chimu sites. His site report of work at Pachacamac was highly praised and is still used as a basic text for studying South American archaeology. He recognized versions of Tiwanaku stone sculpture imagery on ceramics, textiles, and other artifacts in these coastal sites. On this trip, he recovered approximately 9,000 artifacts spanning over 3,000 years of Andean pre-history. These included Nazca pottery, shells, textiles, metals, objects made of wood and other plant material, and objects constructed of animal materials such as feathers, bone, and leather. He concentrated on the dating of these artifacts, and established a system primarily based on textile design. Artifacts found in the Mocha Valley were dated based on the sequential position of Inca ceramic styles. This early dating was later advanced by American archaeologist Alfred Kroeber and is one of the key points in understanding the chronology of pre-Inca Peru. Uhle later worked in the highlands of Bolivia, Ecuador, and Chile. In 1917 he was the first to scientifically describe the Chinchorro mummies.

Max Ulhe also participated in numerous paleontological excavations. In 1926, Max Uhle and paleontologist, Franz Spillmann, excavated, about 12 km east of Quito, Ecuador, an almost complete mastodon skeleton, together with associated obsidian and bone tools and about 150 potsherds.

Uhle also made a notable contribution to North American archaeology in excavations of the Emeryville shell-mound in San Francisco Bay, California. The German-Peruvian Max Uhle School in Arequipa, Peru was named after him.

== Bibliography ==
- Pachacámac (1903).
- La esfera de influencia del país de los incas (1908).
- Las relaciones prehistóricas entre el Perú y la Argentina (1912).
- Los orígenes de los incas (1912).
- Die Ruinen von Moche (1913).
- Las fortalezas incaicas de Incallacta y Machupicchu (1917)
- Los principios de las antiguas civilizaciones peruanas (1920).
- Los principios de las civilizaciones en la sierra peruana (1920).
- Fundamentos etnicos y arqueologia de Arica y Tacna (1922)
- Las antiguas civilizaciones del Perú frente a la arqueología e historia del continente americano (1935).

== See also ==
- Martin Gusinde Anthropological Museum
