= Anne Chapman =

American anthropologist

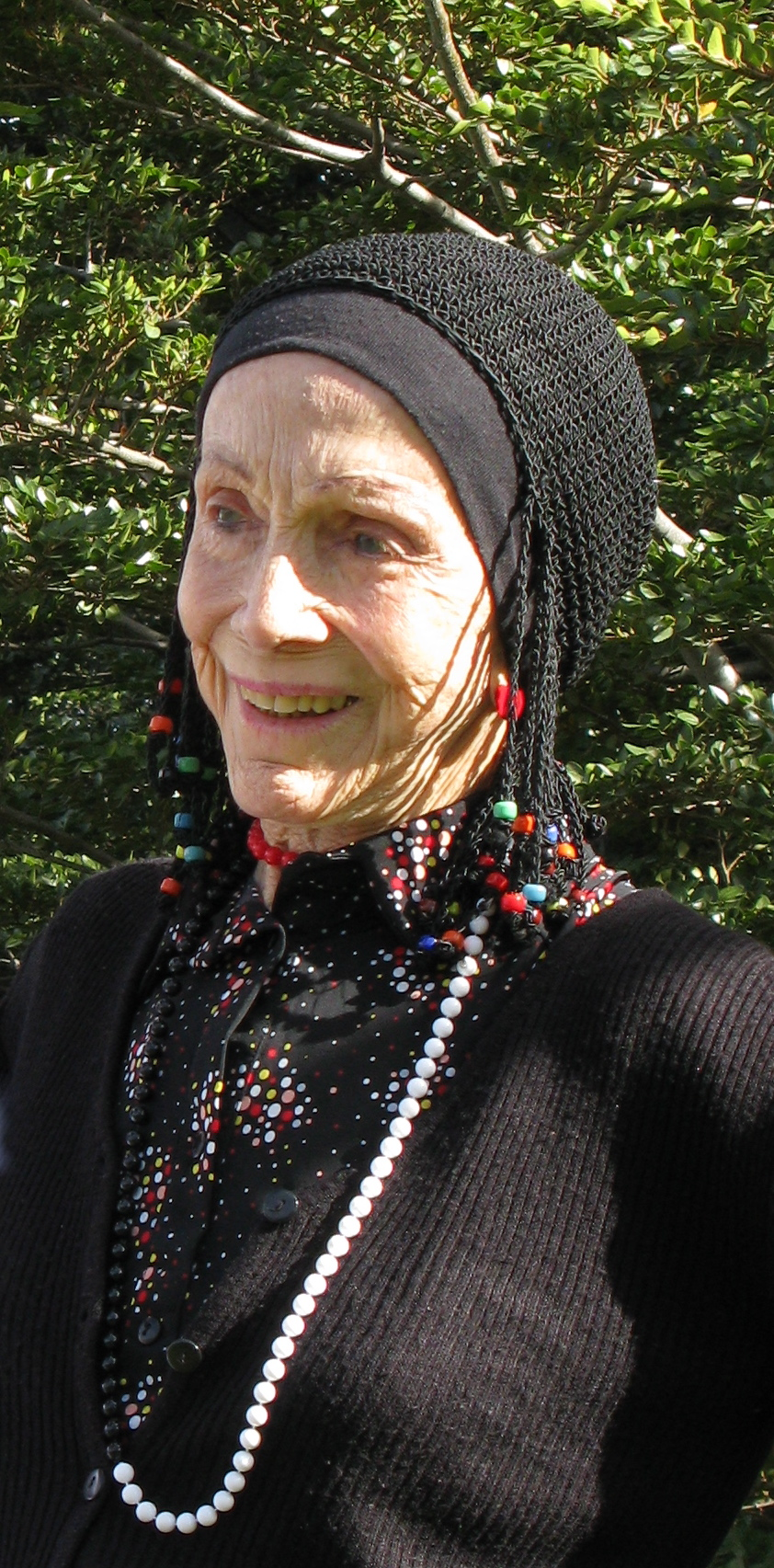
- Chapman in 2009.
- Born: Anne MacKaye Chapman; January 27, 1922; Los Angeles, California, U.S.
- Died: June 12, 2010 (aged 88); Paris, France

Anne MacKaye Chapman (January 27, 1922 – June 12, 2010) was a Franco-American ethnologist who focused on the people of Mesoamerica. She wrote several books, co-produced movies, and captured sound recordings of rare languages from the Northern Triangle of Central America to Cape Horn in South America.

== Life and career ==
Anne MacKaye Chapman was born in 1922 in Los Angeles, California. She left for Mexico in 1940, enrolling at the Escuela Nacional de Antropología e Historia (ENAH) in Mexico City. At the ENAH, Chapman studied with Paul Kirchhoff, Wigberto Jiménez Moreno, and Miguel Covarrubias. Inspired by the work of Covarrubias, Chapman and her colleagues published Anthropos, a journal combining art with articles on anthropology and politics. Only two editions were ever published, both in 1947, due to limited resources. Chapman conducted her first ethnographic fieldwork as a student among Mayan communities in Chiapas, Mexico—first, among the Tzeltales under Sol Tax, and later among the Tzoziles under Alfonso Villa Rojas. She eventually earned her master's degree in anthropology in 1951 from the ENAH; her Master's thesis, entitled "La Guerra de los Aztecas contra los Tepanecas," used Clausewitz's theories on war to analyze the defeat of the Tepanecas by the Aztecs to gain their independence in the early 15th century.

Chapman returned to the U.S. in the 1950s, earning her Ph.D. in anthropology from Columbia University in New York City in 1958. Her dissertation was entitled An Historical Analysis of the Tropical Forest Tribes on the Southern Border of Mesoamerica. While at Columbia, she studied with Conrad Arensberg and worked as an assistant to Karl Polanyi from 1953 to 1955. Another professor, William Duncan Strong, introduced her to the Tolupan (Jicaque) of Honduras. After being awarded funds by the Fulbright Foundation and the Research Institute for the Study of Man (RISM), Chapman began her fieldwork in 1955 among the Tolupan in Montaña de la Flor, Honduras. She would return for a period of several months every year through 1960 for her research, but maintained her relationship with the community for the rest of her life. During her fieldwork, Chapman primarily worked with Alfonso Martinez. Through him, Chapman was able to make a study of Tolupan oral tradition and social organization, as well as to elaborate detailed genealogies of the community. Her research eventually resulted in a book, Les Enfants de la Mort: Univers Mythique des Indiens Tolupan (Jicaque), published in 1978; a revised English text was published in 1992 under the title Master of Animals: Oral tradition of the Tolupan Indians, Honduras. Alfonso Martinez died of measles in 1969.

Chapman also conducted ethnographic research among the Lenca of Honduras, starting in 1965–66, and continuing through the 1980s. Her work followed up on analysis by Kirchhoff on "cultural areas," particularly Mesoamerica. She sought to address a doubt raised by Kirchhoff about whether the Lenca should be considered a Mesoamerican group, ultimately resolving the question in the affirmative in an article entitled "Los Lencas de Honduras en el siglo XVI," published in 1978. In addition, in 1985-86 she published a two-volume study of Lenca rituals and tradition titled Los Hijos del Copal y la Candela.

In 1961, Chapman became a member of the French Centre National de la Recherche Scientifique, working under Claude Lévi-Strauss until 1969, and eventually retiring from the center in 1987. During her long career as an ethnographer, she was associated with various other research centers in Europe and the Americas, including: the Musée de l'Homme in Paris, France; the Research Institute for the Study of Man in New York City; the Instituto Hondureño de Antropología in Tegucigalpa, Honduras; and the Instituto Nacional de Antropología in Buenos Aires, Argentina.

In 1964, Chapman was invited to join the team of archaeologist Annette Laming-Emperaire on a project in Tierra del Fuego, Argentina. Although not an archaeologist by training, Chapman accepted for the opportunity to meet Lola Kiepja and Ángela Loij, some of the last few living Selkʼnam (Ona) of Tierra del Fuego. After finishing the archaeology project, Chapman met with Lola and recorded her speaking and singing in Selkʼnam, as well as her memories of life as a Selkʼnam. Although Lola died in 1966, Chapman was able to continue working with the remaining Selkʼnam in Tierra del Fuego. In 1976, she co-produced a film about the Selkʼnam along with Ana Montes, The Onas: Life and Death in Tierra del Fuego. In 1985, she expanded her fieldwork to include the remaining Yahgans in Tierra del Fuego, Chile.

Chapman wrote on many important anthropologic issues; possibly her most important work concerning the Fuegians was Drama and Power in a Hunting Society: The Selkʼnam of Tierra del Fuego (1981). She also wrote La Isla de los Estados en la prehistoria: Primeros datos arqueológicos (1987, Buenos Aires), El Fin de Un Mundo: Los Selkʼnam de Tierra del Fuego' (1990, Buenos Aires), and three chapters listed in Cap Horn 1882-1883: Rencontre avec les Indiens Yahgan (1995, Paris), which contains many photographs taken by members of the French expedition to Cape Horn (1882-83) that are among the best of the Yahgans; ten of the Alakaluf in 1881 of the eleven who were kidnapped and taken to Paris and other European cities; and six of the last Yahgans she took in 1964 and 1987. She also made a film about the lives of the members of the Yahgan tribe titled Homage to the Yahgans: The Last Indians of Tierra del Fuego and Cape Horn (1990), which was a finalist in the International Film and TV Festival of New York.

Later she wrote Hain: Selknam Initiation Ceremony, and along with the End of a World: The Selknam of Tierra del Fuego, both books include a CD of Lola Kiepja's Hain chants. In 2004, Chapman published El fenómeno de la canoa yagán (Universidad Marítima de Chile, Viña del Mar) and in 2006 both Darwin in Tierra del Fuego and Lom: amor y venganza, mitos de los yámana.

Her last book is entitled European Encounters with the Yamana People of Cape Horn, Before and After Darwin (2010, New York, Cambridge University Press), a narrative of the dramas played out from 1578 to 2000 in the Cape Horn area of Chile by the native people, the navigators, the missionaries and other Europeans.

Towards the end of her life, Chapman resided primarily in Buenos Aires, working and writing there. Chapman died at age 88 on June 12, 2010, in a Paris hospital.
