= Yagan Usi Territorial Museum =

Anthropology museum in Puerto Williams, southern Chile

- Museo Territorial Yagán Usi – Martín González Calderón

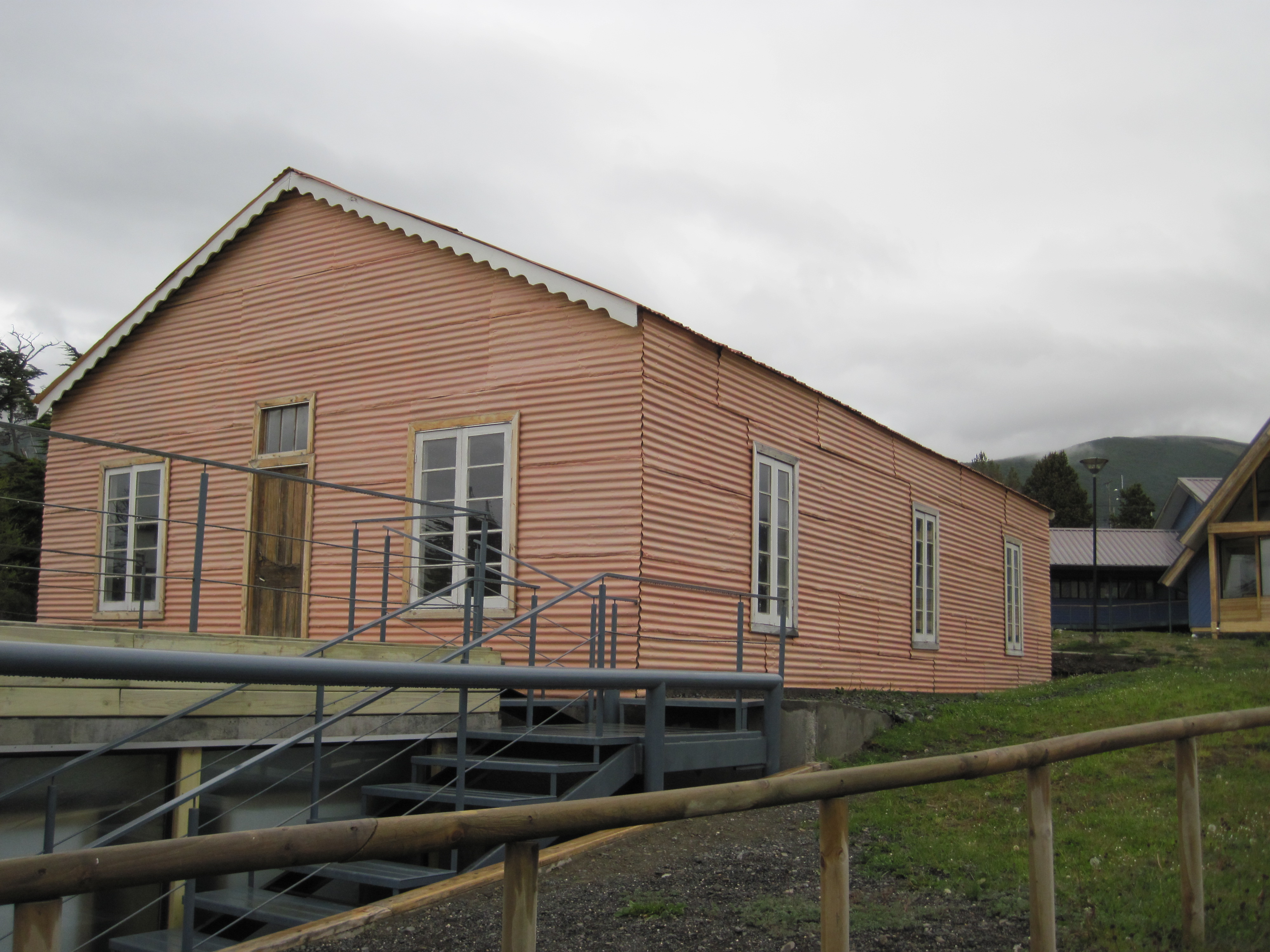
- Stirling House, seen from the south. At the right, the museum
- Established: 1975
- Location: Aragay / Gusinde, Puerto Williams
- Coordinates: 54.94°S 67.61°W
- Type: Archaeology museum
- Collection size: almost 4,000 pieces
- Visitors: 4,905
- Director: Alberto Serrano Fillol
- Website: Museo Territorial Yagan Usi

The Yagan Usi Territorial Museum (Spanish: Museo Territorial Yagan Usi) (formerly known as the Martin Gusinde Anthropological Museum) is an anthropology museum in Puerto Williams, Isla Navarino, in southern Chile. It is the southernmost museum of the world. The museum hosts artifacts, maps and photographs related to the 10,000-year history of the Yahgan people, as well as European settlers since the 19th century. Samples of local flora and fauna are also displayed, as well as photographs and text from the founding of Puerto Williams.

== History ==
Before the museum was founded, archaeological materials from the island's coastal areas as well as objects of historical interest were collected and exhibited in then-Mixed School N°3 of Puerto Williams.

The museum was proposed and built by the Chilean Navy in 1974, which had a base in the area. It was named after Martin Gusinde, an Austrian anthropologist who worked in Tierra del Fuego between 1918 and 1924. The structure is partly built of Alerce wood.

The Martin Gusinde Anthropological Museum was officially renamed to the Museo Territorial Yagán Usi – Martín González Calderón on January 10, 2024. The renaming and reopening ceremony took place in Puerto Williams, Chile, following a request from the local Yagán community. The new name highlights the territory (Usi) and honors Martín González Calderón, an influential Yagán master craftsman, navigator, and language advocate who died in 2020.

== Exhibit ==
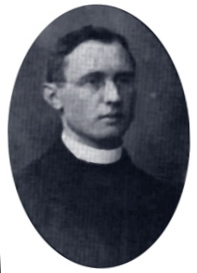
Martin Gusinde, priest and ethnologist

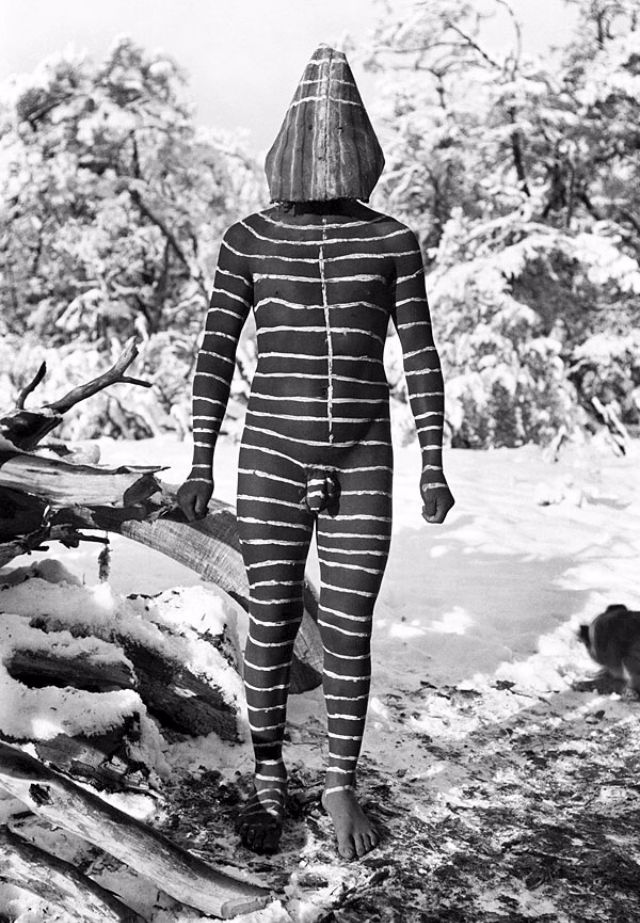
Male painted for initiation rite of Selk'nam people

The goal of the exhibition is to "inspire the conservation of the cultural and natural heritage of the region". In two floors and three halls and 810 square metres (8,700 sq ft), the museum offers a variety of perspectives on the history and culture of the region:

=== First floor ===
The first floor shows photographs, maps, objects as a synthesis of the history of the Yahgan people, the first explorations by Europeans and Chileans (1520–1890), and the gold rush from 1890 to 1950.

==== Hall A ====
Articulating the Myths, a Meeting of Perspectives: The reproduction of a traditional canoe is displayed in the center of the hall to symbolize the spirit and heart of the Museum: to serve as a vessel that enables people to travel to other shores of understanding.

==== Hall B: Secrets of the Canoe World ====
1. Primordial Patagonia: describes the prehistory of Patagonia and Tierra del Fuego, which is generally considered to date from around 11,000–12,000 years ago, towards the end of the Ice Age, when the first bands of land-based hunter-gatherers reached Última Esperanza Sound, the Strait of Magellan and Tierra del Fuego.
2. Nomads of the Sea: explores the period as the sea waters fell, human groups quickly populated the region, adapting to live there and make use of the marine resources of the region, with groups building and sailing small canoes on the ocean.
3. The Yahgans: the southernmost hunters, fishers and gatherers on Earth
4. Trace of a Presence: social organization among the Yahgan: property, dwellings, marriage and family, political life, clothing, etc.
5. An Unknown Land: describes the diverse geographies, climates, fauna, flora and landscapes contained in Patagonia.
6. The Ceremonial Enchantment: the Yahgan legacy of religious ideas and moral precepts as expressed in their rituals
7. The Encounter with Others: encounters with Europeans and colonization, and results for the Yahgan
8. Today is Yesterday, they are and live like this: explores current lives of Yahgan descendants, who live in Villa Ukika.
9. Secrets of the Canoe World: legends of the Yahgan.

=== Second Floor ===
The second floor presents a collection of local flora and fauna. It also displays photographs and documents related to the foundation of Puerto Williams in 1953.

==== Hall C: Tales of Discovery ====
1. Discovery of the Territory by Europeans, its Exploration and Progressive Recognition, for Europeans, began during the 15th century and mapped new courses on the seven seas.
2. Adventure in a New World: Significance of the discovery of the Strait of Magellan, proving the world was round.
3. Sailing between Two Oceans: Dutch discovery (among Europeans) of the southernmost islands of the continent and the second interoceanic passage
4. The Safe Route: sea route established for communication and trade; attracting fortune hunters and pirates
5. Sovereignty over the Southernmost Lands: dispute between Chile and Argentina and resolution with the Boundary treaty of 1881
6. Adventurers and Scientists: from 19th-century botanical collections, hydrographic investigations, astronomical observations and ethnographic accounts, plus meteorological, geographical and geological studies.
7. Magellan, Beginnings of the Territory’s Exploration: fur trade and artifacts of shipwrecks: foundations, instruments, objects, accessories, tools, merchandise, silverware; and gold fever,
8. Life is Imposed in the Area: development and changes through land concessions and colonization, fishing concessions, anthropological missions.

== Community work ==
The museum is involved in local or neighbourhood work across a range of services, including information and advice, counseling, advocacy and support: delivering a Wi-Fi zone, skill enhancement for teachers, art expositions, films exhibition, etc.

== Stirling Pavilion ==
The Stirling Pavilion of the museum allows the public to better understand the evolution of the Stirling House as an Anglican mission, as well as the region.

The Stirling House is a prefab structure, planned and made of cast iron by the Iron Works of Mr. Hemming & Co., Old Ford, in 1869 for £265.00. on behalf of the South American Mission Society (SAMS). The overall size of the house was 6 m × 3.5 m (20 ft × 11 ft). The house had cellar (bricks), a firm roof with steel trusses, and walls covered with sheets of zinc. It was the first building erected by Europeans in Tierra del Fuego and was named for the missionary Waite Stirling, who had set up a mission at Ushuaia, living in a hut.

Towards the end of 1870 the house arrived (unassembled) in Port Stanley. It was transported to and built in Ushuaia in 1871. It was used as a residence by the missionaries Thomas Bridges and James Lewis and their families.

To extend their influence over the outer islands by a more central location, SAMS moved the house to the Baily Island in 1888. Leonard Burgleigh and his wife lived there as missionaries.

In 1894 the house was reinstalled at Tekenika Bay, on the southeast coast of Hoste Island. The missionaries were trying to set up a center in a location away from the abuses and crimes caused by the recent arrival of miners in Ushuaia.

The Yahgan continued to suffer high fatalities due to infectious disease. The land was poor and they were being encroached on by gold diggers. In 1907 the mission decided to move to the Douglas Bay area on the Navarino Island. The station in Ushuaia was closed and the remaining materials were sent to Douglas Bay. It became the center of all missionary work in the region. After the mission in Douglas Bay was finally closed in 1916, the house was used by a variety of residents.

In 2003 Casa Stirling was declared a Chilean National Monument. In 2004 it was moved by sea from Douglas Bay (at the Murray Channel) to Puerto Williams on the lands of the anthropological museum. It preserves and operates it as a historic house.

== See also ==
- Puerto Toro
