= Martin Gusinde =

Austrian priest and ethnologist

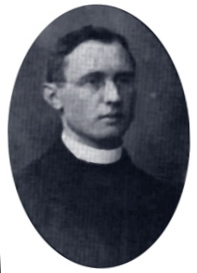
Martin Gusinde

Martín Gusinde (29 October 1886, in Breslau – 18 October 1969, in Mödling, Austria) was an Austrian priest and ethnologist famous for his work in anthropology, particularly on the Fuegians. He was one of the most notable anthropologists in Chile in the first half of the 20th century, together with Max Uhle and Aureliano Oyarzún Navarro.

== Career ==
In 1900, Martin Gusinde joined the missionary order Divine Word Missionaries. He began higher studies in 1905 in St. Gabriel in Mödling, near Vienna. After ordination in 1911, Gusinde went to Chile. He worked as a teacher from 1912 to the end of 1913 and subsequently at the Ethnographic Museum in Santiago de Chile with Max Uhle until 1922, becoming a head of department in 1918.

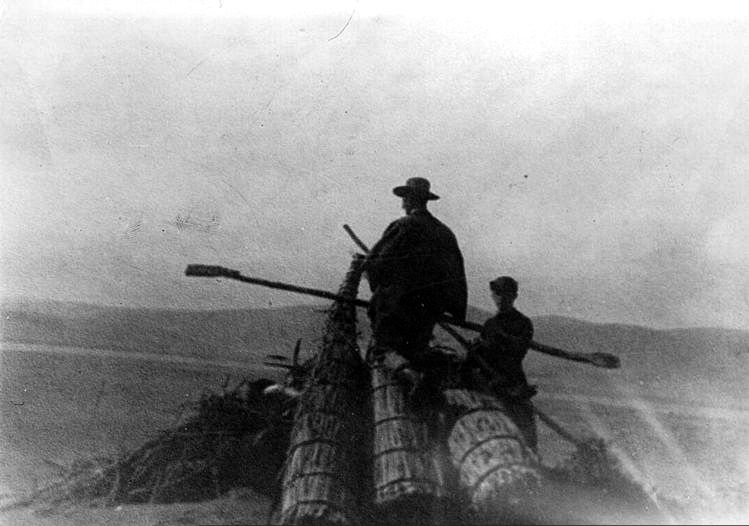
Martin Gusinde on the Indigenous Midden, Pichilemu, 1917

Gusinde undertook four research journeys to Tierra del Fuego between the end of 1918 and 1924. The objective was to explore the different groups of Fuegian people, the Yamana and Selkʼnam (also known as Ona), who had been displaced by settlers and severely depleted by imported diseases for which they lacked natural resistance. He stayed in Tierra del Fuego for 22 months in total. He was allowed to participate in the initiation rites of the groups he studied. On behalf of the Berlin Phonogram Archive, he recorded songs and chants of the indigenous peoples.

In 1926 Gusinde, gained a doctorate in anthropology at the University of Vienna. Together with Ferdinand Hestermann, he edited and helped arrange for publication in 1933 of a Yamana-English dictionary, based on an 1879 manuscript by Rev. Thomas Bridges, an Anglican missionary at Ushuaia. This was later reprinted in Buenos Aires in 1987, and in a paperback edition in 2011.

During the mid-1930s, he studied the pygmies in the Congo.

Between 1949 and 1957, Gusinde served as a professor at The Catholic University of America in Washington, DC. He undertook an expedition to the Ayom pygmies in New Guinea in 1956. From 1959 to 1960 he taught at Nanzan University in Nagoya, Japan.

He ended his career in research, lecturing and teaching activities at the Mission St. Gabriel in Maria Enzersdorf, Vienna. Martín Gusinde died in Mödling on 10 October 1969.

== Legacy ==
In Puerto Williams, Chile, the Martin Gusinde Anthropological Museum was erected in his honour, which records his work with the Tierra del Fuego people. He is also honoured in the placenames, Padre Martin Gusinde street in Padre Hurtado, Santiago, Chile and Martin-Gusinde-Gasse in Maria Enzersdorf, Austria.

== Decorations and awards ==
- 1952: Karl Renner Prize
- 1958: Austrian Decoration for Science and Art
- 1966: Grand Silver Medal with Star for Services to the Republic of Austria
- Honorary Ring of Vienna

== See also ==
- Media related to Martin Gusinde Anthropological Museum at Wikimedia Commons
- Martin Gusinde Anthropological Museum
- Tierra del Fuego#European colonization and extinction of Native Americans (1860–1910)
