= Thomas Bridges (missionary) =

Anglican missionary and linguist (c. 1842 – 1898)

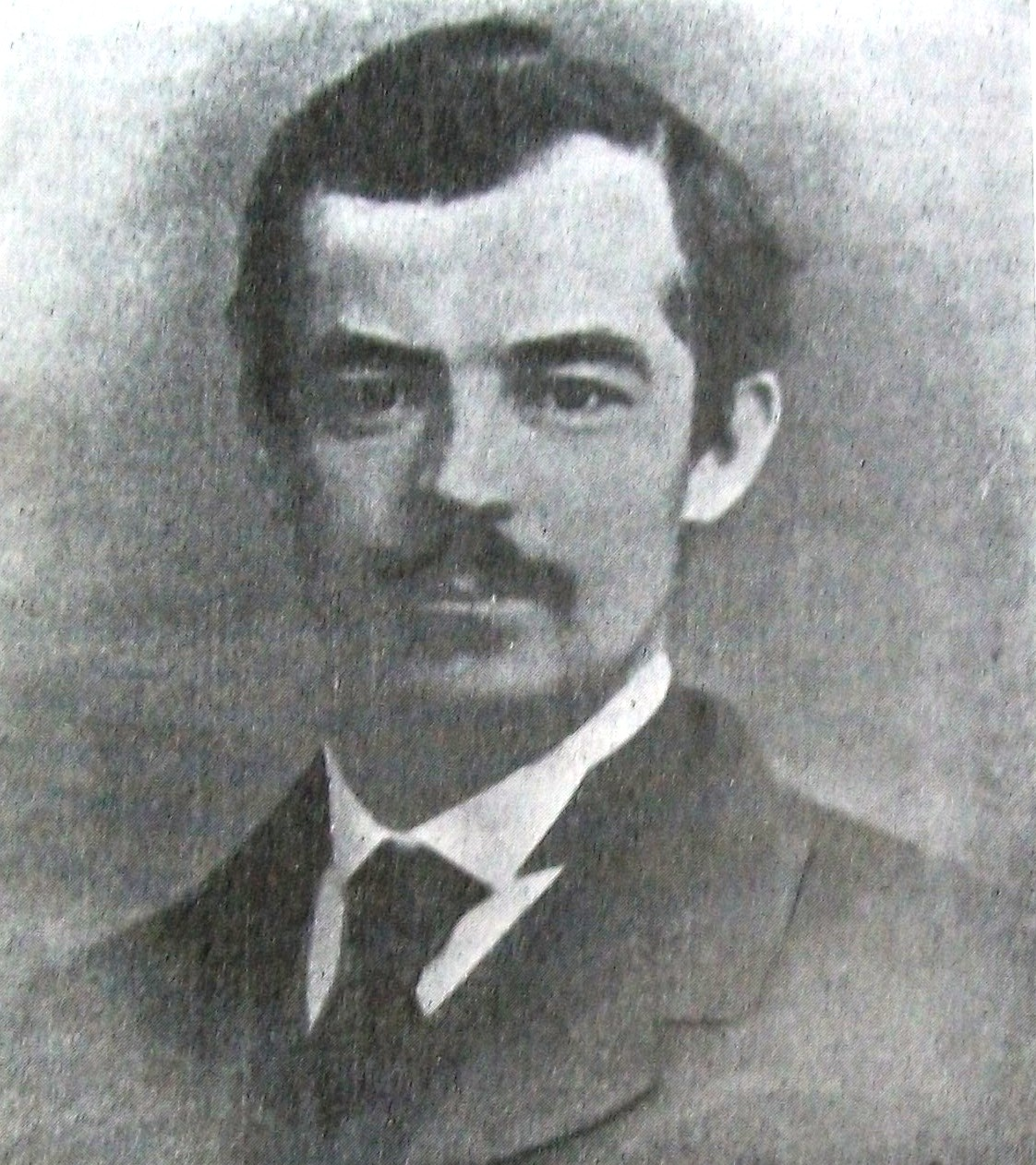
- Thomas Bridges
- Born: c. 1842; England
- Died: 15 July 1898 (aged 55–56); Buenos Aires, Argentina
- Occupation: Anglican missionary
- Known for: Establishing a mission in Tierra del Fuego

Thomas Bridges (c. 1842 – 1898) was an Anglican missionary and linguist, the first to set up a successful mission to the indigenous peoples in Tierra del Fuego, an archipelago shared by Argentina and Chile. Adopted and raised in England by George Pakenham Despard, he accompanied his father to Chile with the Patagonian Missionary Society. After an attack by indigenous people, in 1859 Bridges' father, Despard, left the mission at Keppel Island of the Falkland Islands, to return with his family to England. At the age of 17, Bridges stayed with the mission as its new superintendent. In the late 1860s, he worked to set up a mission at what is now the town of Ushuaia along the southern shore of Tierra del Fuego Island.

Ordained and married during a trip to Great Britain in 1868–1869, Bridges returned to the Falkland Islands with his wife. They settled at the mission at Ushuaia, where four of their six children were born. He continued to work with the Selkʼnam (Ona) and Yaghan peoples for nearly 20 more years. On Bridges' retirement from missionary service in 1886, the Argentine government gave him a large grant of land. He became a sheep and cattle rancher.

As a young man, Bridges had learned the indigenous language of Yamana and closely studied the culture over his lifetime. Over more than a decade, he compiled a grammar and dictionary in Yamana–English of more than 30,000 words. His son Lucas Bridges donated the work to the British Library of London in 1930. Part of the dictionary was published in 1933, then consisting only of the Yamana–English portion. That was edited and published commercially in 1987, since reprinted in 2011. An English–Yamana manuscript, dated 1865, was discovered in the British Library by Alfredo Prieto. The two portions have been published together online at the Patagonia Bookshelf website to provide free access.

== Early life ==
Thomas was born in England in 1842. According to local legend, he was later found abandoned on a bridge in Bristol, by George Despard, the chaplain of the Clifton Union. Despard adopted Bridges and another boy, educating them in a private school that he ran. Later, upon being told of the adoption, Thomas "chose for himself the surname Bridges in honor of the meeting that had saved his life."

There is no record of Thomas Bridges in the 1851 UK census. He is believed to be registered as George H. Bridges among the listed students at the private school run by George Despard. The name change was likely due to a transcription error.

== Expedition ==
From 1853 to 1855, Despard was curate at Holy Trinity Church in Lenton, Nottingham. He had previously lived in Bristol where he met Allen Gardiner, a commander in the Royal Navy. Gardiner led expeditions to Tierra del Fuego in southern Argentina.

Gardiner tried but was unable to make contact with the indigenous people in Tierra del Fuego. Despard, then secretary of the Patagonian Missionary Society, led the next expedition to the area. He took with him his second wife and his children: four daughters, Emily, Bertha, Florence and Harriet, and his son Emilius. He also took Thomas Bridges, then about 13 years old. This trip was much more successful than earlier ones. Despard made contact with the local indigenous people and persuaded several to go to Keppel Island of the Falklands, where there was a mission and the climate was less severe. Some of the natives learned English while on Keppel Island. Some of the English party, Thomas Bridges in particular, learned the local language of Yámana.

== Missionary work ==
After an attack on the Allen Gardiner, (Note: On 6 November 1859, the Allen Gardiner was attacked by a group of Yahgan, who massacred the ship's catechist, captain, and six sailors.) Despard petitioned the missionary society to be allowed to return to England because of the danger to his wife and children. When the society gave its approval, he and his family departed. Thomas Bridges, then 17, stayed in order to take charge of the Keppel Island mission.

Bridges spent the next year on Keppel Island, living with some of the Yahgan who had remained. He began to perfect his knowledge of Yámana. At the time, he started work on a Yahgan grammar and dictionary, which he completed about a decade later in 1879. It included more than 30,000 words, and is considered an important ethnological work.

The next superintendent of the base was the Rev. Waite Hockin Stirling. Stirling and Bridges made their first excursion into Tierra del Fuego in 1863. They made contact with the Yahgan, who received them well after learning that the white man Bridges could speak their languages. Stirling encouraged the young man to continue his studies of it. By 1865, Bridges had completed a manuscript of an English-Yahgan dictionary. He noted in a preface that he was using the Ellis Phonetic System established by Alexander Ellis.

In 1866, Stirling sailed to England accompanied by four Yahgan boys, and returned with all of them. From 1867–1868, the British assisted a group of Fuegians in setting up a settlement at Laiwaia on Navarino Island.

Stirling and Bridges looked in the area for the best spot for a mission. The site chosen was in what is now Ushuaia, near what is called Beagle Channel (after the scientific expedition on HMS Beagle). A small, three-roomed prefabricated hut, about 20 feet (6.1 m) by 10 feet (3.0 m), was prepared at Port Stanley, Falkland Islands, for installation at Ushuaia. After the hut was erected, Stirling moved in on 14 January 1869. He was joined by one of the Yahgan who had accompanied him to England, and the man's wife.

=== Brief trip to England ===
In 1868, the South American Missionary Society (the renamed Patagonian Missionary Society) decided that Bridges should return to England to study and take Holy Orders. In 1869, when he was about 27, he was ordained deacon by the Bishop of London. He spent some time on a lecture tour of England, when he discussed Tierra del Fuego and his work there, and helped raise funds for the missionary society.

While speaking at an award ceremony for schoolteachers in Clevedon, near Bristol, Bridges met Mary Ann Varder, his future wife. She was the daughter of Stephen and Ann Varder; her father was a master carpenter. They lived in Harberton, a village about a mile south-west of Totnes. Five weeks after the couple first met, Thomas and Mary Ann were married by licence in the parish church at Harberton on 7 August 1869.

=== Return to South America ===
Two days after they were married, the Bridges sailed for Rio de Janeiro, en route for the Falkland Islands, where settlements had been established by the British. In addition, the Allen Gardiner delivered materials at Ushuaia for a new prefabricated mission house to be erected near the first small house "at the top of the hill." On 10 October 1870, Bridges returned there with other men from the Falklands to dig the foundations and build Stirling House out of the iron structural elements delivered the previous year. Mary Ann was pregnant and stayed in the Falkland Islands until after their daughter was born.

After the birth of their daughter Mary, Bridges returned to Ushuaia. He and Jacob Resyck took up residence in Stirling House. Another missionary, Mr. Lewis, traveled to Keppel Island to pick up his family, returning on 14 May with his wife, son, and new baby. The baby was baptised Frank Ooshooia Lewis in Stirling House on 28 May. On 17 August, Bridges sailed with his wife and daughter to Ushuaia, arriving on 27 September 1871. Together with the Lewises, they established the Mission.

When Stirling returned to the Falklands in early January 1872, he received a salute of seven guns and was installed as bishop. After visiting Ushuaia, on 23 March he wrote,

We have just returned from Tierra del Fuego, and can report favourably of our work there. The Bridges and Lewises were well, and exerting a wholesome influence on the Indian population. Thirty-six men, women, and children were baptised, and seven couples married as Christians. My little hut is transformed into a school-church, and our congregations in it were crammed to excess during my stay, when the native services took place. A spreading influence for good is manifest, and the future appears to me full of hope for these Southern Indian tribes.

In his records, Bridges noted meeting his first Selkʼnam (Ona) people in 1875. This group lived east of the Yahgan, in the northeastern portion of Tierra del Fuego. Bridges later gave them space on his property, Estancia Harberton, in an effort to protect them from encroachment and attacks by Europeans.

He worked to learn their language, Yahgan. Through the late 1870s, Bridges continued his major work: compiling an English–Yahgan - Yahgan–English dictionary and a grammar of the Yahgan language.

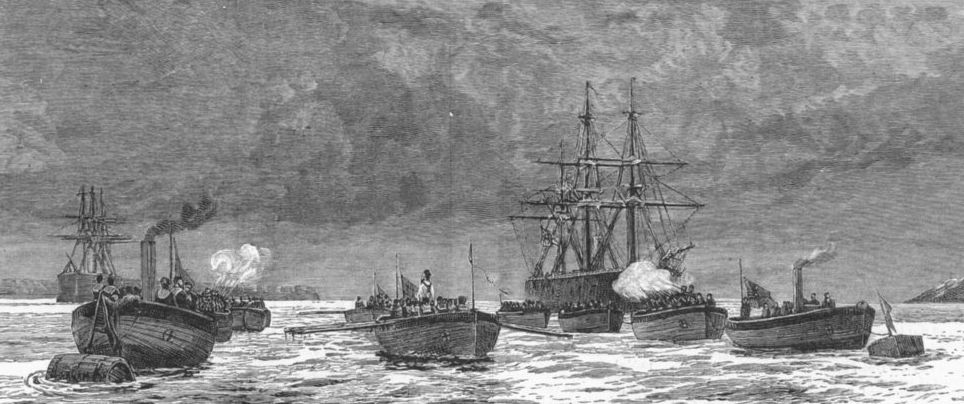
Funeral service performed over the remains of those who perished by the explosion of HMS Doterel – The Graphic, London 1881

In addition to ministering to the Yahgan, Bridges was also called upon to serve the British community. On 26 April 1881 HMS Doterel suffered a massive explosion while it was anchored near Punta Arenas. The ship sank immediately, and 143 members of the crew were killed, most blown to pieces. There were 12 survivors. Small boats set off from the harbor and other ships to aid survivors. Crews worked all afternoon to recover bodies; only three were recovered whole and the crews put the remains into boxes. Bridges presided over a mass funeral for the sailors on ships and boats in the harbour.

== Family ==
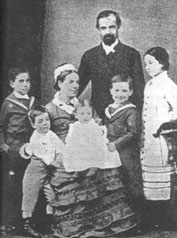
Thomas Bridges posing with his family

The Bridges had six children, four of whom were born in Ushuaia. Mary Ann Varder Bridges (called Mary) was born in 1870, Their eldest son, Thomas (Tomas) Despard Bridges (called Despard), was born in 1872. Stephen (Esteban) Lucas Bridges, called Lucas, was born in 1874; William (Guillermo) Samuel Bridges in 1876, Bertha Milman Bridges in 1879, and Alice Couty Bridges in 1882. Mary's younger sister, Johanna Varder, arrived from England in 1874 to join the mission and help care for the growing Bridges family. The children grew up speaking English, Yámana and Spanish. In 1901 Mary married SAMS missionary W. Barbrooke Grubb.

== Later years ==
Bridges continued to work with the Yahgan, prosyletizing, teaching English, and trying to help them survive the rapid changes in the area. In the late 19th century, gold was discovered on Tierra del Fuego, and waves of immigrants arrived looking to make their fortune.

In addition, Europeans developed sheep farming in the islands. Beginning in the 1880s, they began to settle for the first time in the territories of the Selkʼnam and Haush. They particularly encroached on the Selkʼnam as they established large sheep ranches in the area, and then attacked the people for hunting the animals as game in their traditional territory. Large sheep ranchers offered bounties to groups of armed men for proof of killing the indigenous people, and a Selknam genocide was carried out.

Bridges continued his work in studying the languages and cultures of the indigenous people. He engaged his sons in this work as well. By 1884 Bridges and his son Despard compiled a 1200-word vocabulary for the Kawésqar people (then called Alacalufe), who inhabited areas to the west of the Yahgan. It was in the form of a manuscript. His son Lucas learned Selkʼnam and became close to the people; in addition, he compiled a vocabulary of the Manek'enk (or Haush).

In 1886, the government of Argentina established a Navy sub-prefecture in Ushuaia. At about age 44, Bridges left the Mission. The government granted him citizenship in Argentina and gave him 50,000 acres (200 km^{2}) of land to the east of Ushuaia, which he and his family developed as Estancia Harberton. There they raised sheep and cattle. His house on the ranch was prefabricated in England by his wife's relation, Stephen Varder, and shipped to Tierra del Fuego in the 360-ton brigantine Shepherdess. Bridges offered the Selkʼnam space on his estancia where they could continue their traditional lives.

Also on board the Shepherdess were two carpenters and Edward Aspinall, the new superintendent of the Ushuaia Mission. Aspinall relocated the mission to the Wollaston Islands, which he felt was more centrally placed in the archipelago to reach the Yahgan. The Stirling House was relocated there for a period.

In 1897, Bridges met Frederick Cook, an American doctor and explorer with the Belgian Antarctic Expedition, which stopped in at Tierra del Fuego on its way to (and later, from) the south. During their acquaintance of some weeks, Cook and Bridges discussed the Yahgan at length. Cook asked to borrow Bridges' Yámana grammar and dictionary for reference, and took it with him on the expedition ship Belgica. Bridges was later unable to get him to return it, despite repeated requests until his death.

The pastor died in Buenos Aires on 15 July 1898, due to stomach cancer. He is buried in Cementerio Británico. His tombstone records that he was 55 years old. Later buried in the same grave were his grandson, Percival William Reynolds (1904–1940); his son, Lucas Bridges, who published a book in 1948 describing his father's mission experience and the various cultures on the islands; and Lucas' wife Jannette McLeod Jardine (1890–1976), whom he had met and married in England. Thomas' widow Mary Ann Bridges returned to England after her husband's death; she lived in Shipbourne, Kent, until 1922.

== Posthumous battles and publication of manuscript ==
In 1910 The New York Times reported that Frederick Cook, whose claim to have been the first to reach the North Pole had been rejected in 1909, had been accused by Charles H. Townsend, director of the New York Aquarium, of trying to have Bridges' Yámana grammar and dictionary manuscript published under his own name, under the auspices of the Commission de la Belgica. Lucas Bridges, the missionary's son, had appealed to the Commission to ensure his father was fully credited for his work and to publish the work.

Lucas Bridges donated what he thought was the complete dictionary manuscript to the British Library in 1930. Bridges' 1879 dictionary manuscript, consisting only of the Yahgan/Yámana-English portion, was published in 1933. It was edited by Ferdinand Hestermann (1878–1959) and Martin Gusinde, German and Austrian anthropologists respectively, and published by Missionsdruckerei St. Gabriel in a small edition. Gusinde had done much work among the Yahgan in Tierra del Fuego in the early 20th century. Bridges' manuscripts for his grammar and English–Yahgan/Yámana portions of the dictionary were thought to have been lost.

The Hestermann and Gusinde edition, still consisting of only the Yamana–English portion of the dictionary, was reprinted by Zagier & Urruty Publications of Buenos Aires in 1987. Zagier & Urruty also published a paperback edition of the work in 2011.

Chilean archeologist Alfredo Prieto, of the Universidad de Magallanes, discovered Bridges' English-Yámana dictionary manuscript, dated 1865, in the British Library in London. It included annotations by Rev. John Williams, a later SAMS missionary to the Yahgan. His notes indicated that he had used this manuscript up until the closing of the Anglican mission in 1916. Williams next served as the first Anglican minister at Punta Arenas.

Edited and organized by Prieto, the two portions of the dictionary have been published together online (2004–2013) by Campbell and Grace at their "Patagonia Bookshelf" website. It is the first time that the English-Yahgan/Yámana portion has been published and the complete edition is available for free. Bridges' preface to his English–Yámana manuscript notes that he used the Ellis Phonetic System, developed by the English mathematician Alexander John Ellis, also a philologist.

== Books ==
- Rev. Thomas Bridges, Yamana–English: A Dictionary of the Speech of Tierra del Fuego, ed. Ferdinand Hestermann and Martin Gusinde, Mödling bei Wien (Vienna): Missionsdruckerei St. Gabriel (1933)
- Rev. Thomas Bridges, Yamana–English: A Dictionary of the Speech of Tierra del Fuego, ed. Ferdinand Hestermann and Martin Gusinde, Buenos Aires: Zagier & Urruty Publications, 1987/Reprint edition 2011, 664 pages
- Yahgan Dictionary: Language of the Yamana people of Tierra del Fuego, Manuscript of Rev. Thomas Bridges for English–Yamana, dated 1865, (later annotations by Rev. John Williams), ed. Alfred Prieto, English–Yamana portion published for the first time online, Patagonia Bookshelf, 2004–2013
