= Cochinoca Department =

Cochinoca
- Department
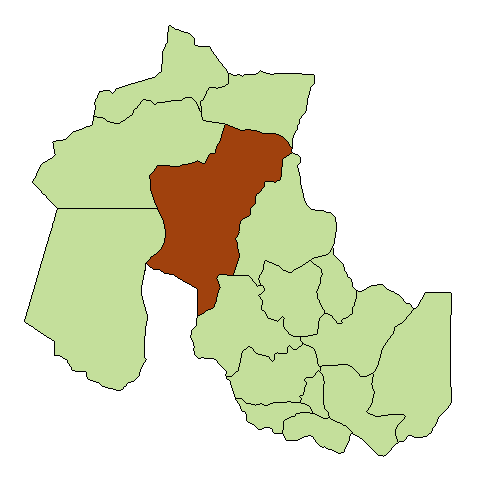
- Coordinates: 22°43′22″S 65°41′48″W
- Country: Argentina
- Province: Jujuy

Area
  - Total: 7,837 km^{2} (3,026 sq mi)

Population (2022)
  - Total: 15,054
  - Density: 1.5/km^{2} (3.9/sq mi)

Cochinoca is a department located in the Jujuy Province, (Argentina). According to the 2022 census, it had a population of 15,054 inhabitants.

== History ==
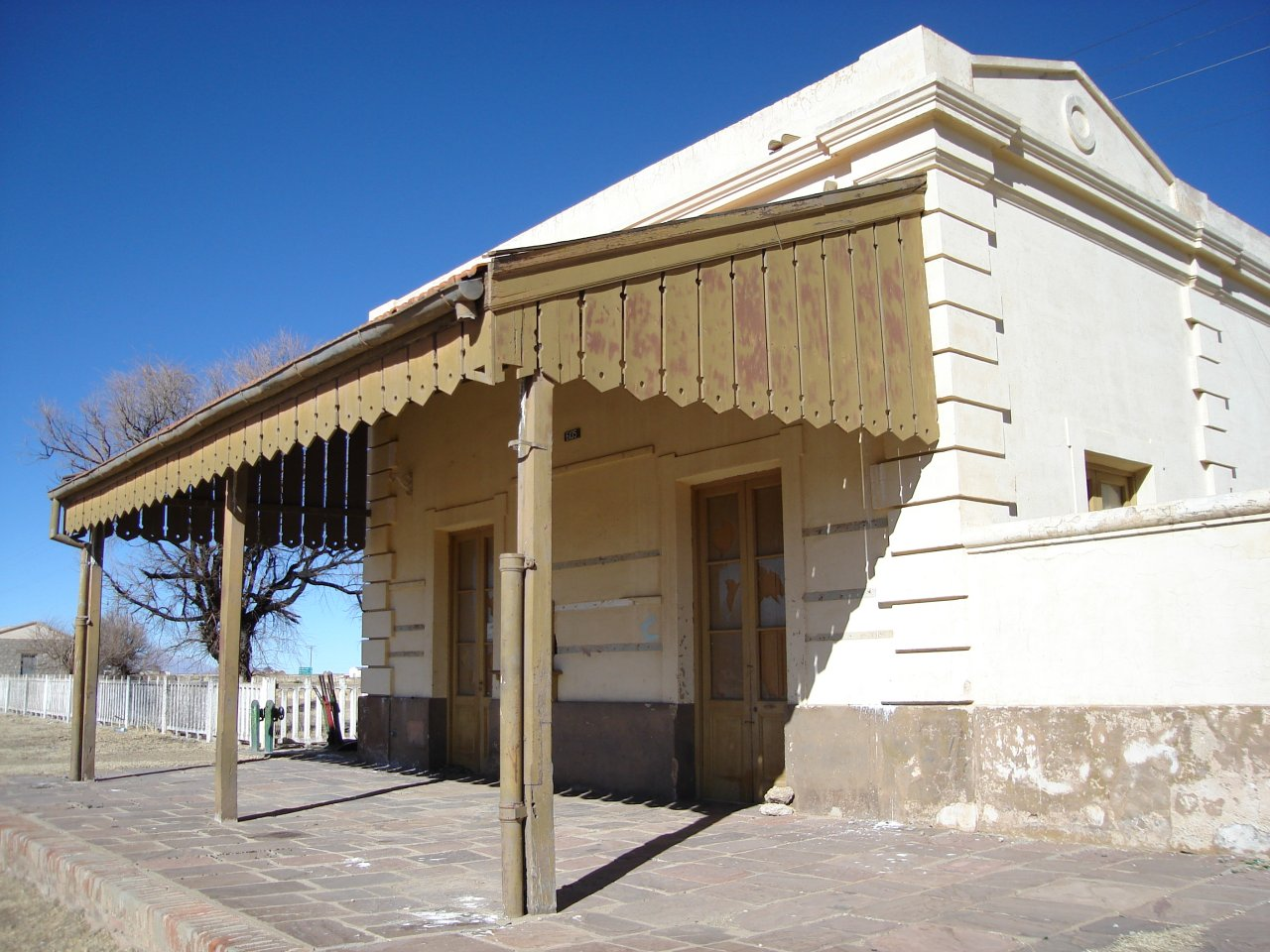
Puesto del Marqés, in the Cochinoca Department

When the Spanish conquistadors arrived in the region in the third decade of the sixteenth century they found indigenous, casabindos and cochinocas (partially originating from a mixture of likan antai and omaguacas). These were living in a large zone with abundant mineral resources and from the fifteenth century up to this point have been affected by quechua invaders. This may account for Cochinoca becoming the most important village in the Puna area of Argentina.

The Cochinoca populous was founded in the early seventeenth century and by the end of that century it had between 600 and 800 inhabitants.

Because of the displacement of the route through the village, the loss of its status as head of the department in favour of Abra Pampa, as well as the east-bound train line and the decrease in minerals, by 1915 its population was reduced to 45 people.

== Municipalities and Commissions ==
1. Abdón Castro Tolay
2. Abralaite
3. Abra Pampa
4. Puesto del Marqués

== Districts ==
- Abra Pampa, (7496 inhabitants)
- Puesto del Marqués, (299 inhabitants)
- Abdón Castro Tolay, (229 inhabitants)
- Rinconadillas, (189 inhabitants)
- Santuario de Tres Pozos, (164 inhabitants)
- Casabindo, (155 inhabitants)
- Tusaquillas, (93 inhabitants)
- Cochinoca, (75 inhabitants)
- San Francisco de Alfarcito, (57 inhabitants)
- Abralaite, (53 inhabitants)
- Tabladitas, (45 inhabitants)

== Sites ==
- Nuevo Arbolito
- Cangrejos
- Miniaio
- Tambillos
- San José de Miraflores
- Rachaite
- Quichuagua
- Muñayoc
- Cince
- Doncellas Chicas
- Doncellas Grandes
- Rumi Cruz
- Potrero
- Santa Ana de La Puna
- Agua Caliente de la Puna
- Agua Caliente
- Lulluchayoc
- La Redonda
