= Indigenous peoples in Argentina =

Indigenous peoples

Native Argentines
argentinos nativos (Spanish)
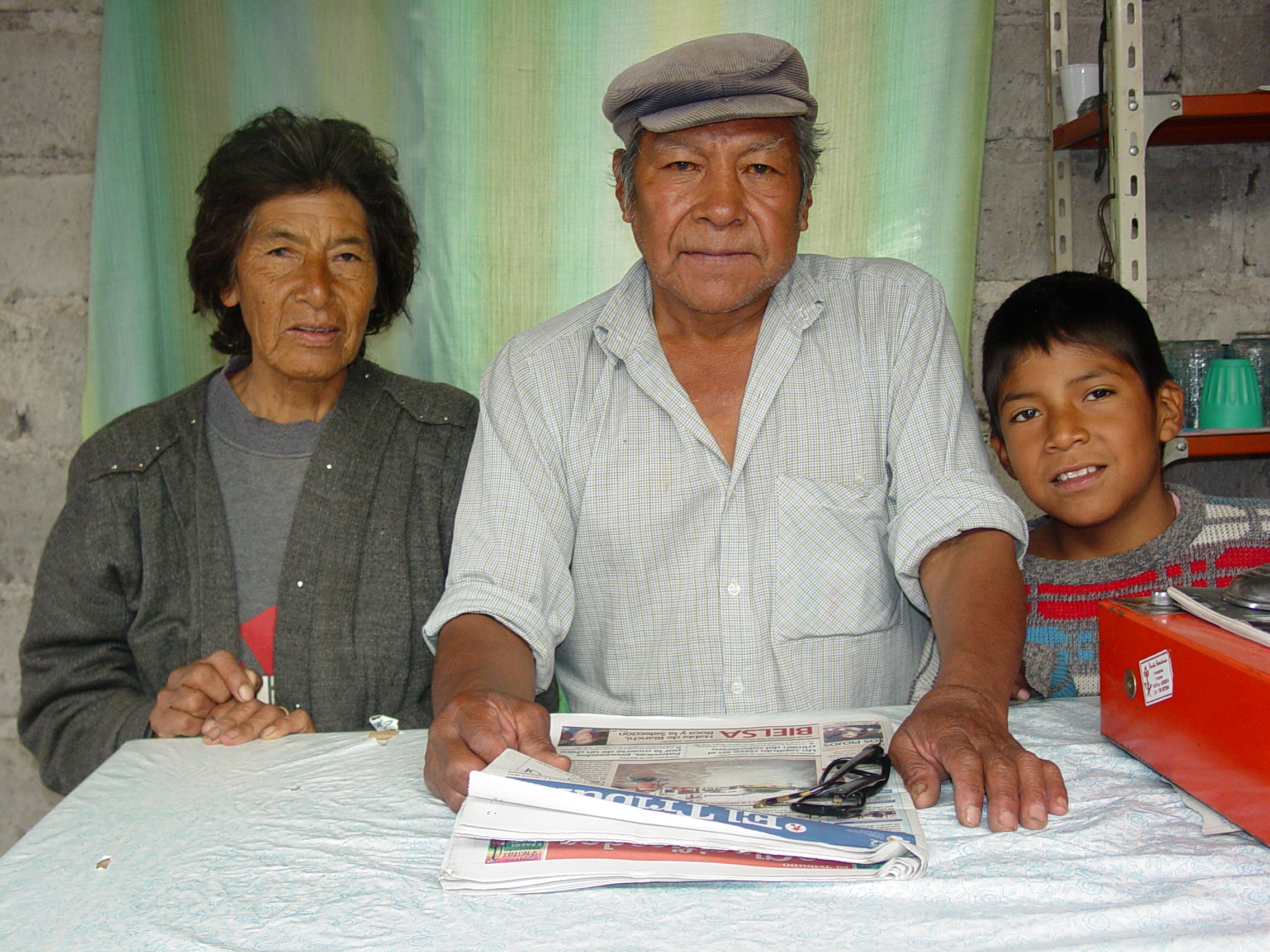
- An Indigenous family that owns a roadside café on the route to Cachi, Salta

Total population
- Indigenous ancestry predominates ▲1,306,730 (2022 census) ▲2.83% of the Argentine population Proportion of Native Argentines in each department as of the 2022 Argentine census

Regions with significant populations
- Predominantly in the Argentine Northwest and in the Patagonia near border areas
- (Buenos Aires Province) Buenos Aires: 371,830
- (Salta Province) Salta: 142,870
- (Jujuy Province) Jujuy: 81,538
- Buenos Aires City: 74,724
- (Córdoba Province, Argentina) Córdoba: 69,218

Languages
- Spanish • Indigenous languages (including Guaraní, Qom, Wichí, Quechua, Mapuche)

Religion
- Majority: Catholicism; Minority: Native American religions

Related ethnic groups
- Indigenous peoples of the Americas

Native Argentines (Spanish: argentinos nativos), also known as Indigenous Argentines (argentinos indígenas), are Argentines who have predominant or total ancestry from one of the 39 groups of Indigenous peoples officially recognized by the national government. As of the 2022 census [INDEC], some 1,306,730 Argentines (2.83% of the country's population) self-identify as Indigenous or first-generation descendants of Indigenous peoples.

The most populous Indigenous groups were the Aonikenk, Kolla, Qom, Wichí, Diaguita, Mocoví, Huarpes, Mapuche and Guarani. Many Argentines also identify as having at least one Indigenous ancestor; a genetic study conducted by the University of Buenos Aires in 2011 showed that more than 56% of the 320 Argentines sampled were shown to have at least one Indigenous ancestor in one parental lineage and around 11% had Indigenous ancestors in both parental lineages.

The Jujuy Province, in the Argentine Northwest, is home to the highest percentage of Indigenous people with 10.07%, followed by Salta with 9.96% and Chubut with 7.92%.

== History ==
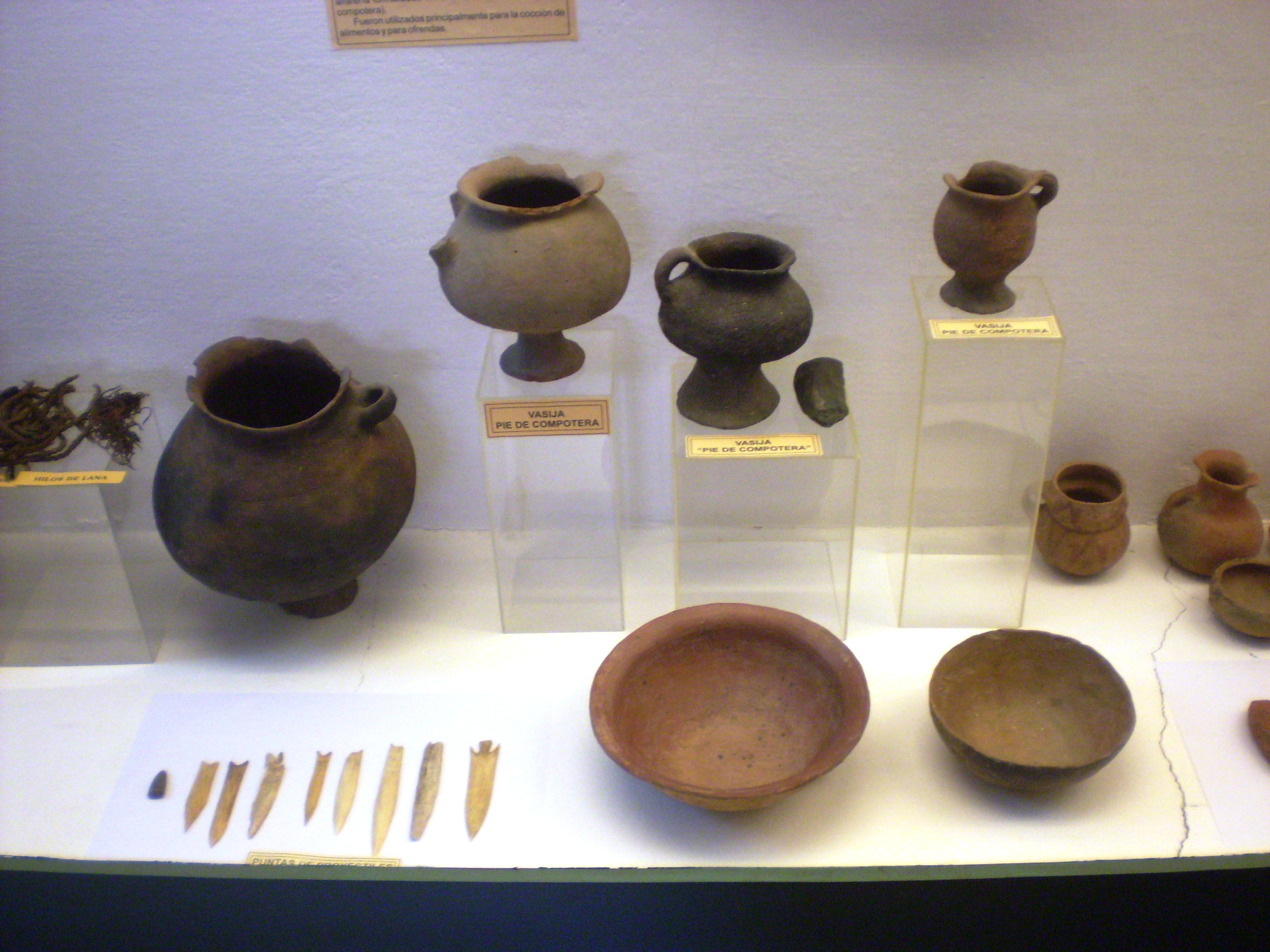
Artifacts at the Pío Pablo Díaz Museum in Cachi, Salta Province. One of several in Argentina devoted to the ethnology of Indigenous peoples.

=== Pre-Columbian history ===
The earliest known evidence of Indigenous peoples in Argentina is dated 11,000 BC and was discovered in what is now known as the Piedra Museo archaeological site in Santa Cruz Province. The Cueva de las Manos, also in Santa Cruz, is over 10,000 years old. Both are among the oldest evidence of Indigenous culture in the Americas, and have, with several similarly ancient sites on other parts of the Southern Hemisphere, challenged the "Clovis First" hypothesis on the settlement of the Americas (the assumption, based on lacking evidence to the contrary, that the Clovis culture was the first in the Western Hemisphere).

Some indigenous groups from present-day Bolivia were resettled as mitmas in Argentina by the Inca Empire in the late 15th century. This was case of some Chuyes from Cochabamba and Churumatas from Tarija who ended up in Salta. Part of the Moyos Moyos from Tarija were resettled in Jujuy.

=== Indigenous peoples after European invasion ===
By the year 1500, many different Indigenous communities lived in what is now modern Argentina. They were not a unified group but many independent ones, with distinct languages, societies, and relations with each other. As a result, they did not face the arrival of the Spanish colonization as a single block and had varied reactions toward the Europeans. The Spanish people looked down on the Indigenous population, considering them inferior to themselves. For this reason, they kept very little historical information about them.

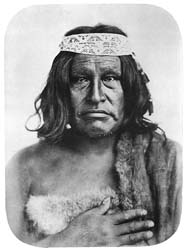
Tehuelche Cacique Casimiro Biguá, c. 1864

In the 19th century major population movements altered the original Patagonian demography. Between 1820 and 1850 the original Aonikenk people were conquered and expelled from their territories by invading Mapuche (that called them Tehuelches) armies. By 1870 most of northern Patagonia and the south east Pampas were Araucanized. During the Generation of 1880, European immigration was strongly encouraged as a way of occupying an empty territory, configuring the national population and, through their colonizing effort, gradually incorporating the nation into the world market. These changes were perhaps best summarized by the anthropological metaphor which states that "Argentines descend from ships." The strength of the immigration and its contribution to the Argentine ethnography is evident by observing that Argentina became the country in the world that received the second highest number of immigrants, with 6.6 million, second only to the United States with 27 million, and ahead of countries such as Canada, Brazil, Australia, etc.

The expansion of European immigrant communities and the railways westward into the Pampas and south into Patagonia was met with Malón raids by displaced tribes. This led to the Conquest of the Desert in the 1870s, which resulted in over 1,300 Indigenous dead. Indigenous cultures in Argentina were consequently affected by a process of invisibilization, promoted by the government during the second half of the 19th century and the early 20th.

The extensive explorations, research and writing by Juan Bautista Ambrosetti and other ethnographers during the 20th century, which followed earlier pioneer studies by anthropologists such as Robert Lehmann-Nitsche, encouraged wider interest in Indigenous people in Argentina, and their contributions to the nation's culture were further underscored during the administration of President Juan Perón in the 1940s and 1950s as part of the rustic criollo culture and values exalted by Perón during that era. Discriminatory policies toward these people and other minorities officially ended, moreover, with the August 3, 1988, enactment of the Antidiscrimination Law (Law 23.592) by President Raúl Alfonsín, and were countered further with the establishment of a government bureau, the National Institute Against Discrimination, Xenophobia, and Racism (INADI), in 1995. Corrientes Province, in 2004, became the first in the nation to award an Indigenous language (Guaraní) with co-official status, and all 35 Native peoples were recognized by both the 2004 Indigenous Peoples Census and by their inclusion as self-descriptive categories in the 2010 census; Indigenous communities and Afro-Argentines thus became the only groups accorded any recognition as ethnic categories by the 2010 census.

== Demographics ==
=== Indigenous communities today ===
Native Argentines 1778–2022
Year	Population	% of Argentina
1778	41,517	22.33%
2001	600,329	▼1.66%
2010	955,032	▲2.38%
2022	1,306,730	▲2.83%
Source: Argentina census INDEC.

Population pyramid of Indigenous Argentines in 2022.

Population of Indigenous people in Greater Buenos Aires according to the 2022 census.

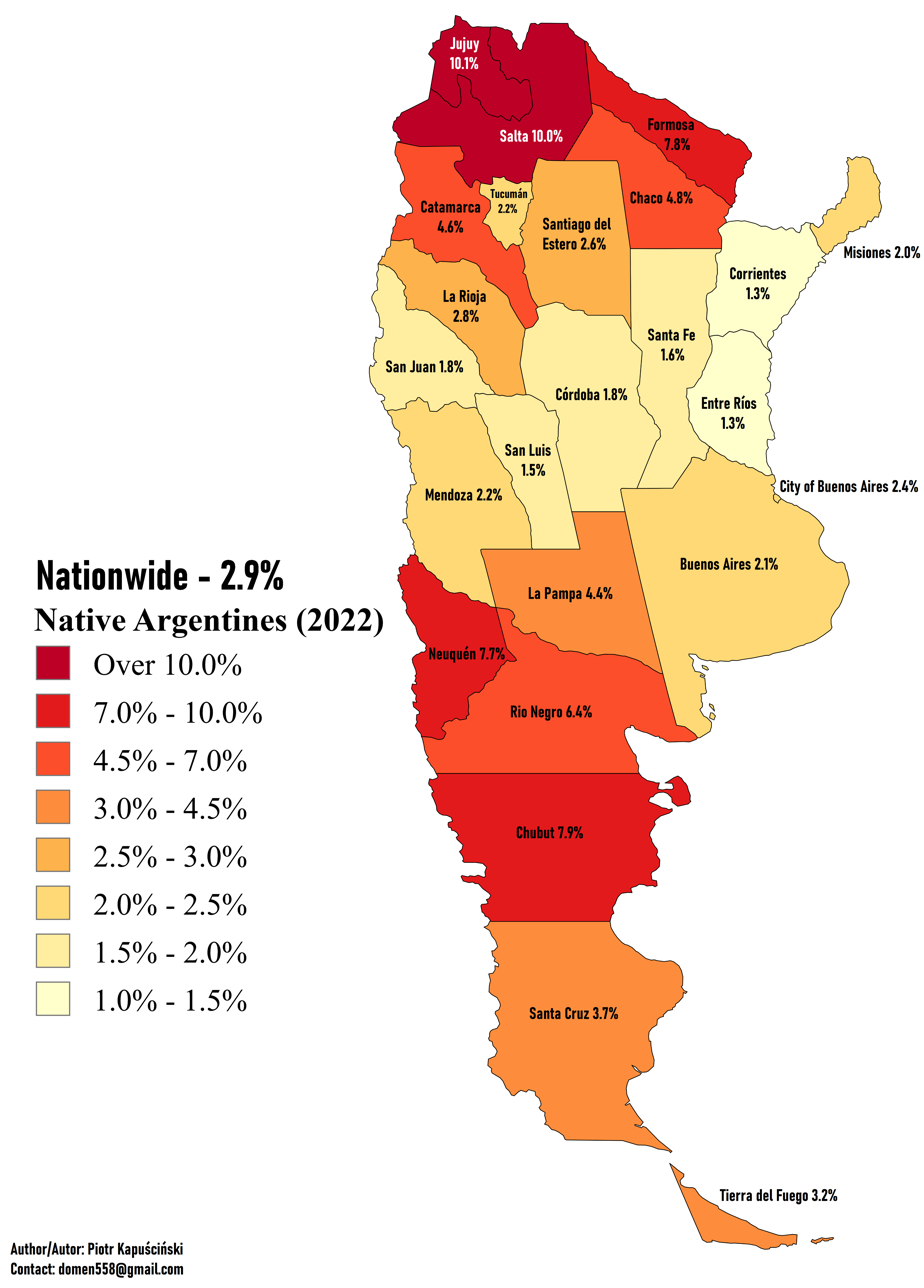
Distribution of Native Argentines by province according to the 2022 census

As of the 2010 census [INDEC], some 955,032 Argentines (2.38% of the country's population) self-identify as Indigenous or first-generation descendants of Indigenous peoples.

The first government-led effort to produce accurate statistical data on the country's Indigenous peoples was the 2001 national census, which included a question on self-identification with Indigenous nations. A more in-depth statistical survey came in 2004, with the Complimentary Survey on Indigenous Populations carried out by the National Institute for Indigenous Affairs (INAI). The 2004 survey which accounted for 600,329 people who see themselves as descending from or belonging to Indigenous people. Indigenous organisations have questioned the factual accuracy of the 2004 survey: First, the methodology used in the survey was considered inadequate, as a large number of Indigenous people live in urban areas where the survey was not fully conducted. Second, many Indigenous people in the country hide their identity for fear of discrimination. Moreover, when the survey was designed in 2001, it was based on the existence of 18 known peoples in the country, opposed to the more than 31 groups recognized by the INAI today. This increase reflects a growing awareness amongst Indigenous people in terms of their ethnic belonging.

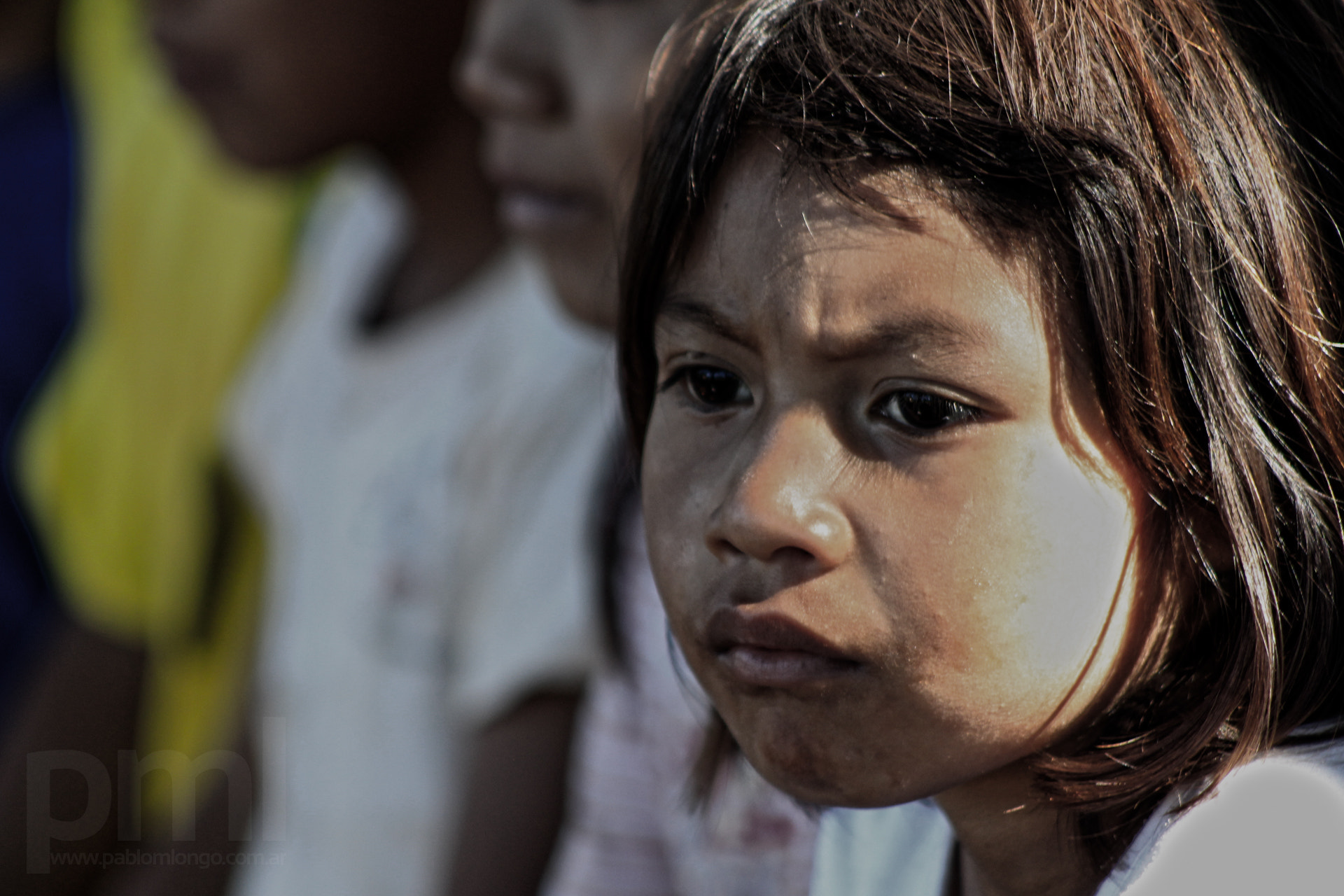
Guaraní girl in Yrapú, Misiones Province.

As many Argentines either believe that the majority of the Indigenous have died out or are on the verge of doing so, or 'their descendants' assimilated into Western civilisation many years ago, they wrongly hold the idea that there are no Indigenous people in their country. The use of pejorative terms likening the Indigenous to lazy, idle, dirty, ignorant and savage are part of the everyday language in Argentina. Due to these incorrect stereotypes, many Indigenous people have been forced over the years to conceal their identity in order to avoid being subjected to racial discrimination.

As of 2011, many Native people were still being denied land and human rights. Many of the Qom Native community had been struggling to protect the land they claim as ancestral territory and even the lives of its members. Qom community leader Félix Díaz claimed that his people were being denied medical assistance, did not have access to drinking water, and were subject to arbitrary rises on food prices by non-Indigenous businesses. He also claimed the local justice system refused to hear the local community's complaints.

The INAI, which reports to the Argentine Ministry of Justice and Human Rights, is tasked with overseeing the government's Indigenous policy and maintaining track of Argentina's Indigenous communities and their rights to their ancestral lands. As of 2018, the INAI kept register of 1,653 communities, of which 1,456 held legal ownership over various territories.

=== Genetic contribution in Argentine society ===
Genetic ancestry of the average Argentinian gene pool according to Caputo et al. (2021) using X-DIPs (matrilineal).
1. European and West Asian Contribution (77.8%)
2. Amerindian Contribution (18.0%)
3. Sub-Saharan Contribution (4.20%)

In addition to the Indigenous population in Argentina, most Argentines are descendants of Indigenous peoples or have some Indigenous ancestry. Many genetic studies have shown that Argentina's genetic footprint is primarily, but not overwhelmingly, European. In a genetic study involving 441 Argentines from across the North East, North West, Southern, and Central provinces (especially the urban conglomeration of Buenos Aires) of the country, it was observed that the average ancestry for the sample was 65% European descent, followed by 31% Indigenous descent, and 4% African descent.

The same study also found there was a range of variation in the ancestry amongst Argentines as one traveled across the country. For example, the population in the North West provinces of Argentina (including the province of Salta) were on average of 66% Indigenous, 33% European, and 1% of African ancestry. The European immigration to this North West part of the country was limited and the original Indigenous population largely thrived after their initial decline owing to the introduction of European diseases and colonization. Similarly, the study also showed that the population in the North Eastern provinces of Argentina (for example, Misiones, Chaco, Corrientes, and Formosa) were on average 43% of Indigenous, 54% European, and 3% of African ancestry. The population of the Southern provinces of Argentina, such as Río Negro and Neuquén, were on average 40% of Indigenous, 54% European, and 6% of African ancestry. Finally, only in areas of massive historical European immigration in Argentina, namely the Central provinces (Buenos Aires and the surrounding urban areas), Argentines were of overwhelmingly European ancestry, with the average person having 17% Indigenous, 76% European, and 7% of African ancestry.

In another study, that was titled the Regional pattern of genetic admixture in South America, the researchers included results from the genetic study of several hundreds of Argentines from all across the country. The study indicated that Argentines were as a whole made up of 38% indogenous, 58.9% of European, and 3.1% of African ancestry. Again, there were huge difference in the genetic ancestry from across the various regions of the country. For example, Argentines who hailed from Patagonia were 45% Indigenous and 55% of European ancestry. The population in the North West part of the country were made up of 69% of Indigenous, 23% of European, and 8% of African ancestry. The population in the Gran Chaco part of the country were 38% of Indigenous, 53% of European, and 9% of African ancestry. The population in the Mesopotamian part of the country were 31% of Indigenous, 63% of European, and 6.4% of African ancestry. Finally, the population in the Pampa region of the country were 22% of Indigenous, 68% of European, and 10% of African ancestry.

Finally, in another study published in 2005 involving the North Western provinces of the country, the genetic structure of 1293 individuals from Jujuy, Salta, Tucumán, Santiago del Estero, Catamarca and La Rioja was analysed. This study showed that the Spanish contribution (50%) predominated in Argentina's North West, followed by the Amerindian (40%) and African (10%) contributions. According to this study, Argentines from Jujuy were 53% Indigenous, 47% European, and 0.1% African ancestry. Argentines from Salta were 41% of Indigenous, 56% of European, and 3.1% of African ancestry. Those from Catamarca were 37% of Indigenous, 53% of European, and 10% of African ancestry. Those from La Rioja were on average 31% Indigenous, 50% European, and 19% African ancestry. The inhabitants of Santiago del Estero were on average 30% Indigenous, 46% European, and 24% African ancestry. The inhabitants of Tucumán were on average 24% Indigenous, 67% European, and 9% African ancestry.

== Indigenous groups by population ==
According to the 2010 census there are the following Indigenous groups:

Indigenous group	Total population	Males	Females
Mapuche	205,009	103,253	101,756
Toba	126,967	63,772	63,195
Guaraní	105,907	53,788	52,119
Diaguita	67,410	34,295	33,115
Kolla	65,066	32,553	32,513
Quechua	55,493	27,849	27,644
Wichí	50,419	25,513	24,906
Comechingón	34,546	17,077	17,469
Huarpe	34,279	17,098	17,181
Tehuelche	27,813	13,948	13,865
Mocoví	22,439	11,498	10,941
Pampa	22,020	10,596	11,424
Aymara	20,822	10,540	10,282
Avá Guaraní	17,899	9,438	8,461
Rankulche	14,860	7,411	7,449
Charrúa	14,649	7,192	7,457
Atacama	13,936	7,095	6,841
Mbya-Guaraní	7,379	3,872	3,507
Omaguaca	6,873	3,551	3,322
Pilagá	5,137	2,623	2,514
Tonocote	4,853	2,437	2,416
Lulé	3,721	1,918	1,803
Tupí Guaraní	3,715	1,872	1,843
Querandí	3,658	1,776	1,882
Chané	3,034	1,559	1,475
Sanavirón	2,871	1,399	1,472
Selkʼnam (Ona)	2,761	1,383	1,378
Chorote	2,270	1,177	1,093
Maimará	1,899	876	1,023
Chulupi	1,100	537	563
Vilela	519	279	240
Tapiete	407	217	189
Others	5,301	2,681	2,620
Total	955,032	481,074	473,958

According to the 2022 census there are the following Indigenous groups:

Indigenous group	Total population
Mapuche	145,783
Guaraní (Ava)	135,232
Diaguita (Calchaquí)	86,022
Toba	80,124
Kolla	69,121
Wichí	69,080
Quechua	52,154
Comechingón	27,509
Huarpe	25,615
Tehuelche (Araucanized)	23,416
Aymara (originally from Bolivia and Peru)	19,247
Mocoví	18,231
Tehuelche	17,420
Rankulche	14,133
Guaraní (Mbyá)	11,014
Tonocoté	10,608
Humahuaca	10,605
Charrúa	9,065
Atacama	6,818
Pilagá	6,169
Diaguita (Cacano)	4,772
Chané	3,296
Chorote	3,238
Sanavirón	3,088
Lule	2,851
Lule vilela	2,303
Puelche	2,260
Ocloya	1,818
Chaná	1,590
Tastil	1,391
Selkʼnam	1,206
Chicha	1,024
Guaycuru	1,006
Querandí	964
Aoniken/Tehuelche	919
Nivaclé	878
Vilela	863
Abipón	817
Tapiete	654
Kolla atacameño	522
Tilian	446
Corundí	387
Toara	299
Fiscara	255
Yahgan	189
Weenhayek/Wichí	179
Guarayo (originally from Bolivia)	155
Minuane	69
Iogys	49
Churumata	47
Jujuí	41
Michilingüe	28
Chonos (originally from Chile)	16
Mak'a (originally from Paraguay)	13
Isoceño/Chané	10
Kawésqar (originally from Chile)	10
Haush	6
Ansilta	2
Total	1,306,730

== Indigenous groups by region ==
Rank	Province	Percentage	Total population
1	Jujuy	▲10.07%	81,538
2	Salta	▲9.96%	142,870
3	Chubut	▲7.92%	46,670
4	Formosa	▲7.84%	47,459
5	Neuquén	▼7.68%	54,436
6	(Río Negro Province) Río Negro	▼6.45%	48,194
7	Chaco	▲4.78%	53,798
8	Catamarca	▲4.60%	19,668
9	La Pampa	▼4.36%	15,659
10	Santa Cruz	▼3.73%	12,525
11	Tierra del Fuego	▲3.21%	5,942
12	La Rioja	▲2.78%	10,645
13	Santiago del Estero	▲2.65%	28,022
14	Buenos Aires City	▲2.41%	74,724
15	Mendoza	▼2.24%	45,389
16	Tucumán	▲2.18%	37,646
17	(Buenos Aires Province) Buenos Aires	▲2.14%	371,830
18	Misiones	▲2.04%	26,006
19	Córdoba	▲1.82%	69,218
20	San Juan	▲1.76%	14,457
21	Santa Fe	▲1.63%	57,193
22	San Luis	▼1.54%	8,340
23	Entre Ríos	▲1.32%	18,693
24	Corrientes	▲1.31%	15,808
Source: Argentine census 2022

=== Northeast ===
This region includes the provinces of Chaco, Corrientes, Entre Ríos, Formosa, Misiones, Santa Fe, and parts of Santiago del Estero Province.

- Charrúa
- Lule
- Mbya-Guaraní
- Mocoví
- Pilagá
- Toba
- Tonocoté
- Vilela
- Wichí
- Guaycuru

=== Northwest ===
This region includes the provinces of Catamarca, Jujuy, La Rioja, Salta, San Juan, parts of Santiago del Estero Province, and Tucumán.

- Atacama
- Avá-Guaraní
- Chané
- Chorote
- Chulupí
- Diaguita
  - Chicoana
- Kolla
- Ocloya
- Omaguaca
- Tapiete
- Toba
- Wichí

=== Central ===
This region includes the Autonomous City of Buenos Aires and the provinces of Buenos Aires, Córdoba, La Pampa, Mendoza, and San Luis.

- Avá Guaraní
- Comechingon
- Diaguita
- Huarpe
- Kolla
- Querandí
- Rankulche

=== South ===
This region includes the provinces of Chubut, Neuquén, Río Negro, Santa Cruz, and Tierra del Fuego.

- Haush (Manek'enk)
- Kawésqar (Alacaluf)
- Mapuche/Pehuenche
- Puelche (Gününa küna)
- Selkʼnam (Ona)
- Tehuelche (Aónikenk)
- Teushen
- Yahgan (Yámana)

== See also ==
- Indigenous peoples of South America
- Araucanization of Patagonia
- Bolivian Argentines
- Languages of Argentina
- Argentine people
- Abipón people
- Amaicha
- Calchaquí
- Capayán
- Poya people
- Guaraní people
- Selkʼnam genocide
