= Santiagueño Quechua =

Southern Quechua dialect of Argentina

- Native to: Argentina
- Ethnicity: Quechua · Lule · Vilela · Tonocotés · Mestizos
- Native speakers: (60,000 cited 2000)
- Language family: Quechuan: Quechua II; Southern Quechua; Santiagueño Quechua
- Dialects: Santiago del Estero; Catamarca–La Rioja †

Language codes
- ISO 639-3: qus
- Glottolog: sant1432
- ELP: Santiago del Estero Quechua
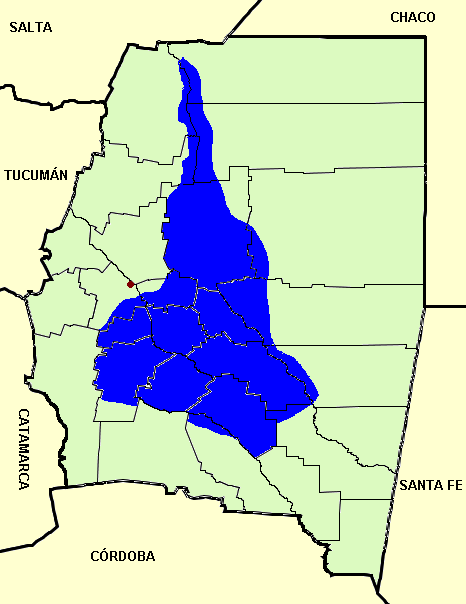
- Approximate extension of Quichua speech in Santiago del Estero.

Santiago del Estero Quichua or Santiagueño Quechua (Santiagen Quichua) is a vulnerable dialect of Southern Quechua spoken by 60,000-100,000 people (estimates vary widely) in Argentina. It is spoken in the province of Santiago del Estero. The estimated coordinates are 27°47′S 64°16′W. Long-standing migration has also resulted in the presence of the language in other provinces of northeastern Argentina and in Buenos Aires.

It is 81% similar to other Quechuan languages. There are radio programs in this languages and also a dictionary. There is some cultivation of the language as it is taught in some schools. It uses the Roman alphabet. Its speakers are Native Americans and they mostly work in agriculture. It is the seventh-most widely spoken language in Argentina behind Spanish, Italian, Levantine Arabic, South Bolivian Quechua, Standard German, and Mapudungun. It is the third most widely spoken indigenous language.

There was once another dialect of Southern Quechua in Argentina, that of Catamarca and La Rioja, but it has gone extinct. All were introduced during the Spanish colonial period, as Quechua speakers were transplanted to various parts of the Spanish realm (continuing a practice of the Inca), and Quechua was an official language of Santiago, Catamarca, and La Rioja during the colonial era.

== Classification ==
Quechuan, Peripheral Quechua, Chinchay

== People ==
The indigenous people of Santiago del Estero were referred to as the "tonocoté". They faced much racism and discrimination from the rest of the Argentinian population which led to the diminishing of their language and culture as a whole. The government even went so far as to release flyers describing what these indigenous people looked like, including red skin and the use of feathers in their clothing. For this reason, they were singled out among the rest of the Hispanic population. Instead of learning their maternal language of Santiagueño Quechua at school, indigenous children were looked over and forced to learn the official Spanish language, which is a contributing factor as to why this language became endangered.

== Phonology ==
There are three vowel phonemes primarily used in this language: /a, i, u/. In addition, as with other Quechuan languages, /a/, /i/ and /u/ possess [ɑ], [e ~ ɛ] and [o ~ ɔ] as allophones in the vicinity of the consonant phoneme /q/. As opposed to other dialects of this language, which use the phoneme /ʎ/, Saniagueño Quechua possesses /ʒ ~ ʑ/, similar to the Argentinian Spanish pronunciation of /ʎ ~ ʝ/ as [ʒ ~ ʑ].

Consonants
		Bilabial	Alveolar	Post-al./ Palatal	Velar	Uvular
Nasal				ɲ		
Plosive/ Affricate	voiceless	p	t	t͡ʃ	k	q
Plosive/ Affricate	voiced				g	ɢ
Fricative	voiceless	ɸ	s	ʃ	x	χ
Fricative	voiced			ʒ		
Approximant			l	j	w	
Flap			ɾ			

== Syntax ==
The verb of movement "to go" has been extensively studied and compared to other dialects of Quechua. It was found that while in other dialects, this verb is used to represent physical movement, in Santiagueño Quechua, it represents a future action. This can be compared to the modern Spanish phrase "ir a" which means "to go" + infinitive in Santiagueño Quechua.

=== Pasado no experimentado ===
It has been discovered that a new category of verb exists in this Quechua language: Pasado no experimentado, which adds a certain suffix to words to represent information that has been related to someone from another person. Usually, the suffix that corresponds to this is -ra. Ex: "niara".

== Examples ==
Many of the following examples have strong similarity to, or borrow words from the Spanish language.

- cóndor- vulture
- cocaví-> provisions for a trip
- qólpa; choclo-> an ear of corn
- kúnliir; molle-> tree of life
- múli or porongo-> pumpkin
- 'kúntur; chingana-> a sort of brothel
- tarúka-> deer
- wik*úña; vincha-> hair tie
- qaparis ti(y)anku-> "they are yelling"
- na riq rini ñuqá-> "I am already going to go"
- más vale rini kutiq-> "Maybe I'll go back"
- nuqa cuchilluyta manasuq-> "I'll lend you my knife"
- Brachup historian rini cuentasuq-> "I will tell you the story of El Bracho."
