= Allentiac language =

Extinct Huarpean language of South America

Allentiac
- Huarpe, Alyentiyak
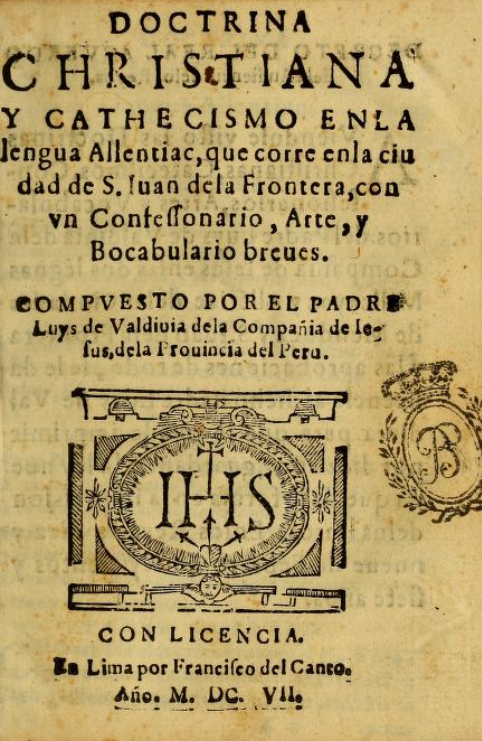
- Doctrina christiana y cathecismo en la lengua allentiac, que corre en la cuidad de S. Iuan de la Frontera, con vn Confessonario, Arte, y Bocabulario breues. Compuesto por el padre Luys de Valdivia de la Compañia de Iesus, de la prouincia del Peru (1607)
- Native to: Argentina, dispossessed to Chile
- Ethnicity: Huarpe people
- Extinct: 17th century
- Language family: Huarpean: Allentiac

Language codes
- ISO 639-3: None (mis)
- Glottolog: alle1238

Allentiac (Alyentiyak), also known as Huarpe (Warpe), is an extinct Huarpean language. It was native to Cuyo in Argentina, but was displaced to Chile in the late 16th century. The language is documented by Luis de Valdivia, a Jesuit missionary, who wrote a grammar, vocabulary and religious texts.

== Phonology and orthography ==
The assessment of Allentiac phonology is tentative and complicated by a lack of explanation on the phonetic value of the symbols used to write the language.

=== Vowels ===
Allentiac had the vowels a, e, i, o, u, ù, the latter also written ⟨ú⟩ and probably representing [ɨ], thereby having a vowel system reminiscent of that of neighboring Mapudungun. The vowel ⟨ù⟩ may not have always been written, resulting in what are apparently word-initial consonant clusters, and an instance of alternation is attested in qtec~qùtec [k(ɨ)tek] 'fire'.

=== Consonants ===
[w] is thought to be represented orthographically by ⟨gu⟩ before ⟨a, o, u⟩ and ⟨hu⟩ before ⟨i, e⟩. ⟨ch, ll, ñ⟩ are "almost certainly" pronounced the same as in Spanish. [k] is written ⟨qu⟩ before ⟨i, e⟩, ⟨q⟩ before "silent" ⟨ù⟩, and ⟨c⟩ in all other positions. An apparently syllabic lateral is also frequent, such as in lpuù [l̩puɨ] 'finger'. A series of apparent sibilants are written as ⟨s, x, z, zh⟩; ⟨s⟩ is rather limited in its distribution, found syllable-finally, typically before another consonant (as in taytayes-nen 'I vanquish'), as well as in hussú [husɨ] 'ostrich', ⟨x⟩ is evidently a palatal sibilant [ʃ] due to alternations with ⟨s, ch⟩ as in acasllahue~acaxllahue 'virgin', rather than a velar fricative [x] as assumed by Bartolomé Mitre. ⟨z⟩ is assumed to be a voiced fricative [z], apparently contrasting with the sequence ⟨ss⟩ between vowels; elsewhere it may have been voiceless [s]. ⟨zh⟩ is tentatively assigned the value [ʒ] as in zhucña [ʒukɲa] 'frog'.

== Morphology ==
From Valdivia's materials Allentiac may be seen as an agglutinative, predominantly suffixing language, with a "well-defined" series of case markers and postpositions, in contrast to Mapudungun.

=== Case ===
Allentiac case markers
Case	Allentiac
locative	-ta
causal	-tati
beneficiary	-tayag
dative	-ye
instrumental	-yen
comitative	-ymen
genitive	-(e)ch, -(i)ch

=== Possession ===
The person of a possessor may be indicated by attaching the genitive case marker to a singular personal pronoun (cu-ch 'my', ca-ch 'your', and ep-ech 'his'), and by additionally affixing -cha to the pronoun for a plural (ep-cha-ch 'their'), though the plural marker in verb paradigms is -chu.

== Vocabulary ==
=== Numerals ===
Allentiac numerals
Numeral	Allentiac
1	lcaa, lca
2	yemen
3	ltun
4	tut
5	horoc
6	zhillca
7	yemenqleu, zac yag
8	ltunqleu
9	tutqleu
10	tucum
11	lca tertecta
12	tucumta yemen
13	ltunqleu tucum, tucumta ltun qleu
14	tucug tutqleu
20	yementucum
30	ltun tucum
40	tut tucum
100	pataca
300	ltunpataca
1000	tucum pataca
3000	ltun nem tucum pataca

=== Color terms ===
Color terms in Allentiac are formed by reduplicating an element followed by -niag, as in hom=hom-niag 'black' and zas=zas-niag 'red'.

== Sample text ==
The Lord's Prayer in Allentiac:

Cvchach Pia chis tactao ta anpen. Cach hene lpucaxetamten. Cach reyno cuchaxtayacten. Cach quilletequiam eltiam ltaten tetata, chis ta mantichquen. Chu tecta cham cuchach cupi quexcheteyag tecta ta. Perxcuxotomte cuchach poyup ta, cuch perxpuxotomta macltichen cuchach aynachanem. Mulxcucolumtche poyup xetuqui xatequepiam. Chu xenec ta quex taynemte. Amen.
