= Simoca =

City in Tucumán Province, Argentina

- City
- Location of Simoca in Argentina
- Coordinates: 27°16′S 65°20′W
- Country: Argentina
- Province: Tucumán
- Department: Simoca

Government
  - Intendant: Elvio Eloy Salazar (PJ)

Area
  - Total: 5 km^{2} (1.9 sq mi)
- Elevation: 301 m (988 ft)

Population (2010)
  - Total: 8,351
  - Density: 1,700/km^{2} (4,300/sq mi)
- Time zone: UTC−3 (ART)
- CPA base: T4172
- Dialing code: +54 3863

Simoca is a city in Tucumán Province, Argentina. It is known for its market and hosts the national festivals of the fair (feria) and the sulky, which is still widely used in the area especially on market day - Saturday.

Simoca is located 52 km south of San Miguel de Tucumán on the national route No. 157 on the way to Córdoba. It is the main town in the Simoca Department. As of 2010, Simoca was recorded as having 8,351 inhabitants.

Simoca is principally a rural centre, supporting the local sugar cane industry and other agriculture. It is known for its pork products and larger than usual empanadas, a delicacy especially popular in Tucumán. The market sells pork and live pigs, as well as other foodstuffs, clothes, crafts and traditional snacks and meals. It is believed to date back to the founding of Simoca in the 17th century.

== History ==
The indigenous Beliches and Simocas were the first people to inhabit this area. These two indigenous groups were of Tonocote and Lule origin.

The first Fiesta de la Feria took place in July 1980. The first Festival Nacional del Sulky was organised in 1973 in the Estadio Club Unión Simoca.

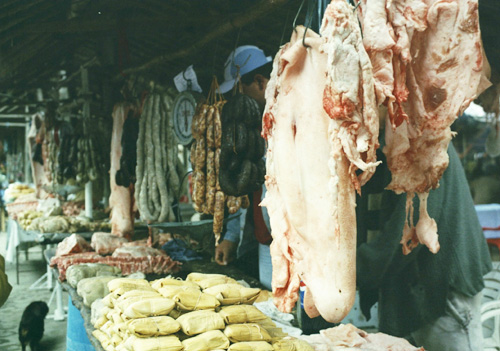
Traditional produce, including Humitas, in Simoca Market.

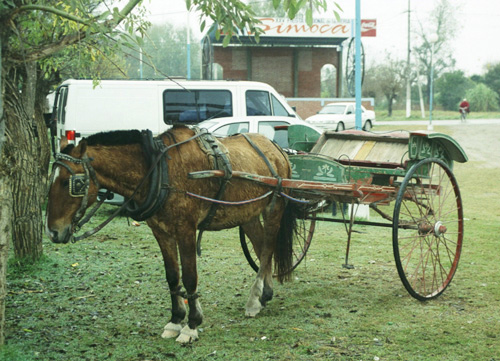
Sulky and horse in Simoca, the 'sulky capital' of Argentina.
