= Millcayac language =

Extinct Huarpean language of Argentina

Millcayac
- Milykayak
- Native to: Argentina, dispossessed to Chile
- Region: Cuyo Province
- Ethnicity: Huarpe people
- Extinct: 17th century
- Language family: Huarpean: Millcayac

Language codes
- ISO 639-3: None (mis)
- Glottolog: mill1237

Millcayac (Milykayak) was one of the Huarpean languages. It was native to Cuyo in Argentina, but was displaced to Chile in the late 16th century. Luis de Valdivia wrote a grammar, vocabulary and religious texts. The people became Mestizo and lost their language soon after.
