= Huarpean languages =

Language family of central Argentina

Huarpean
- Warpean
- Geographic distribution: Cuyo Province, Argentina
- Ethnicity: Huarpe people
- Extinct: after 1630s
- Linguistic classification: One of the world's primary language families
- Subdivisions: Millcayac; Allentiac; Puntano/Michilenge (unattested); ?Comechingón

Language codes
- Glottolog: huar1251
- Map of the Huarpean languages

Huarpe (Warpe) is a small, extinct language family of central Argentina (historic Cuyo Province) that consisted of at least two closely related languages. They are traditionally considered dialects, and include Allentiac (Alyentiyak, Huarpe) and Millcayac (Milykayak). A third, Puntano of San Luis, was not documented before the languages became extinct.

Kaufman (1994) tentatively linked Huarpe to the Mura-Matanawi languages in a family he called Macro-Warpean. However, he noted that "no systematic study" had been made, so that it is best to consider them independent families. Swadesh and Suárez both connected Huarpe to Macro-Jibaro, a possibility that has yet to be investigated.

== Varieties ==
=== Loukotka (1968) ===
Varieties classified by Loukotka (1968) as part of the Huarpe language cluster (all unattested unless noted otherwise, i.e. for Chiquiyama and Comechingon):

- Oico / Holcotian - once spoken in Mendoza Province in the Diamante Valley. (Unattested.)
- Orcoyan / Oscollan - once spoken in the southern regions of Mendoza Province. (Unattested.)
- Chiquiyama - once spoken between the city of Mendoza and the Barranca River.
- Tuluyame / Puelche algarrobero - once spoken in the Calamuchita Valley, Córdoba Province. (Unattested.)
- Michilenge / Puntano - once spoken in the Conlara Valley, San Luis Province. (Unattested.)
- Olongasto - once spoken in La Rioja Province by the neighbors of the Allentiac tribe. (Unattested.)
- Comechingon - extinct language once spoken in the Sierra de Córdoba in Córdoba Province, Argentina

=== Mason (1950) ===
Varieties of the Huarpe-Comechingon linguistic group cited from Canals Frau (1944) by Mason (1950):

- Huarpe-Comechingon
  - Allentiac (Huarpe of San Juan)
  - Millcayac (Huarpe of Mendocino)
  - Puntano Huarpe
  - Puelche of Cuyo
  - Ancient Pehuenche
  - Southern Comechingón (Camiare)
  - Northern Comechingón (Henia)
  - Olongasta (Southern Rioja) ?

Pericot y Garcia (1936) lists Zoquillam, Tunuyam, Chiquillan, Morcoyam, Diamantino (Oyco), Mentuayn, Chom, Titiyam, Otoyam, Ultuyam, and Cucyam.

- Comechingón varieties
  - Comechingón
    - Main
    - Tuya
    - Mundema
    - Cáma
    - Umba
  - Michilingwe
  - Indama

== Phonology ==
The two languages had apparently similar sound systems, which were not dissimilar from Spanish, at least from the records we have. Barros (2009) reconstructs the consonants as follows:

	Labial	Alveolar	Palatal	Velar	Glottal
Nasal	m	n	ɲ	ŋ	
Plosive	p	t		k	
Affricate		ts	tʃ		
Fricative		s	ʃ		h
Semivowel	w		j	(ɰ)	
Lateral		l	ʎ		
Trill		r			
