= Jujuy (disambiguation) =

San Salvador de Jujuy is capital of the Argentine Jujuy province.

Jujuy may also refer to:

- Jujuy Province in Argentina
- Jujuy language, an extinct indigenous language of Argentina
- Jujuy (Buenos Aires Underground), a metro station
