= Cordobés Spanish =

Accent of Spanish spoken in Cordoba, Argentina

- cordobés tonada cordobesa
- Native to: Córdoba, Argentina
- Region: South America
- Language family: Indo-European: Italic; Latino-Faliscan; Romance; Italo-Western; Western; Ibero-Romance; West Iberian; Castilian; Spanish; Rioplatense Spanish; Cordobés Spanish
- Writing system: Latin (Spanish alphabet)

Language codes
- ISO 639-3: –
- IETF: es-u-sd-arx
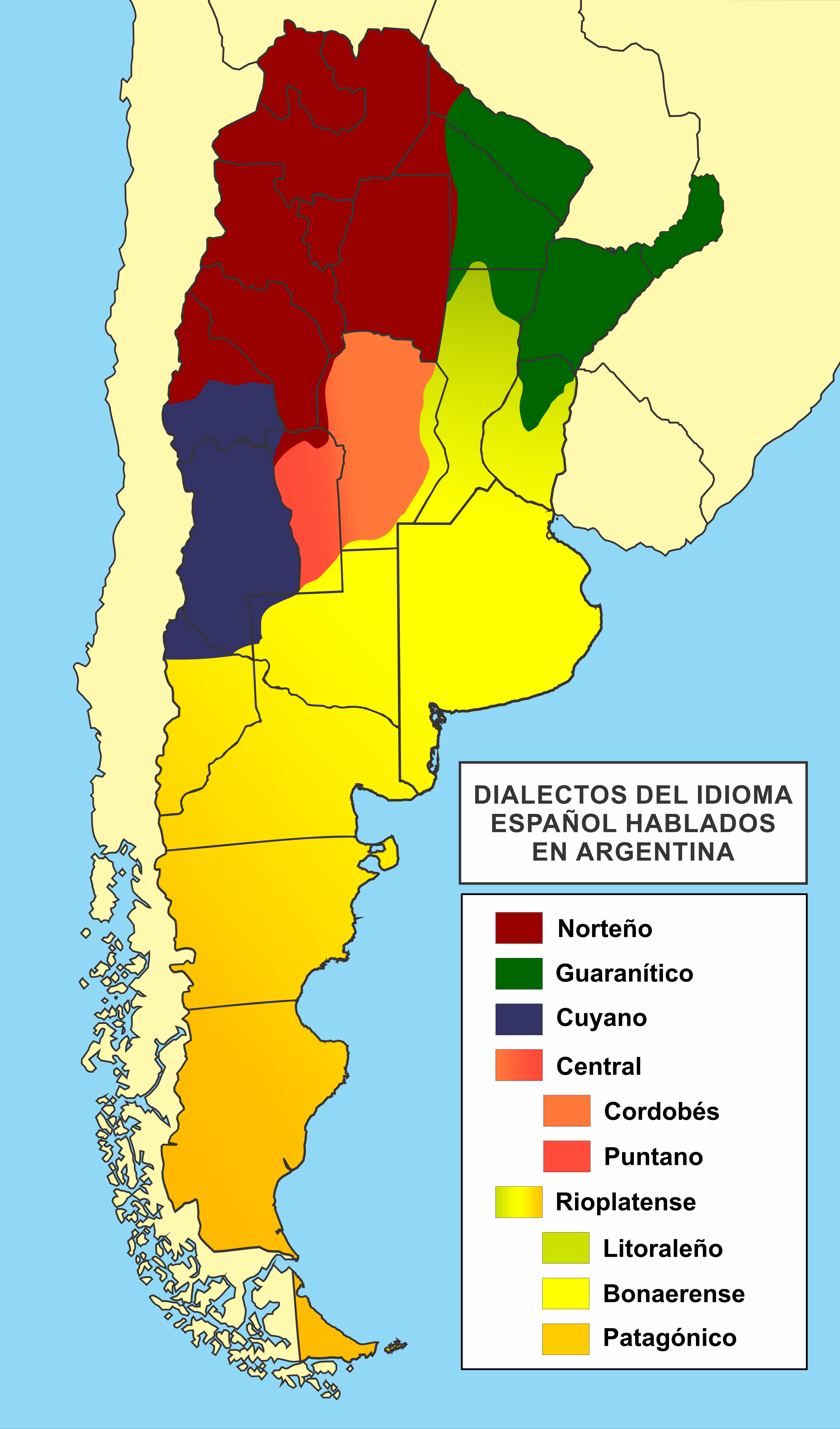
- Varieties of the Spanish language spoken in Argentina by Berta Elena Vidal de Battini

Cordoban Spanish is a regional accent of the Spanish language spoken by the inhabitants of the city of Córdoba, Argentina, and its adjacent territories. Known as cordobés or tonada cordobesa, this accent is often the subject of humorous references in Argentine media and popular culture.

This accent is notably different from the local accents in the provinces neighbouring Córdoba. Seemingly unique, Cordobés is thought to derive from the languages spoken by the Comechingones, the local indigenous people.

Its distinguishing features are the elongation of the sound of the vowel in the syllable preceding the stressed syllable, and of the vowel(s) of the stressed syllable in proparoxytone three-syllable words. Cordobés people also tend to elongate the sound of the last syllable in a word.

According to Donni de Mirande (1991) and Vidal de Battini (1964), Córdobes Spanish can be heard throughout not only most of the Province of Córdoba, but also in most of the Province of San Luis, given its location and the influence of Cordoba's media and culture.

== See also ==
- Languages of Argentina
