= Abra Pampa =

Coordinates: 22°43′S 65°42′W

- Municipality and town
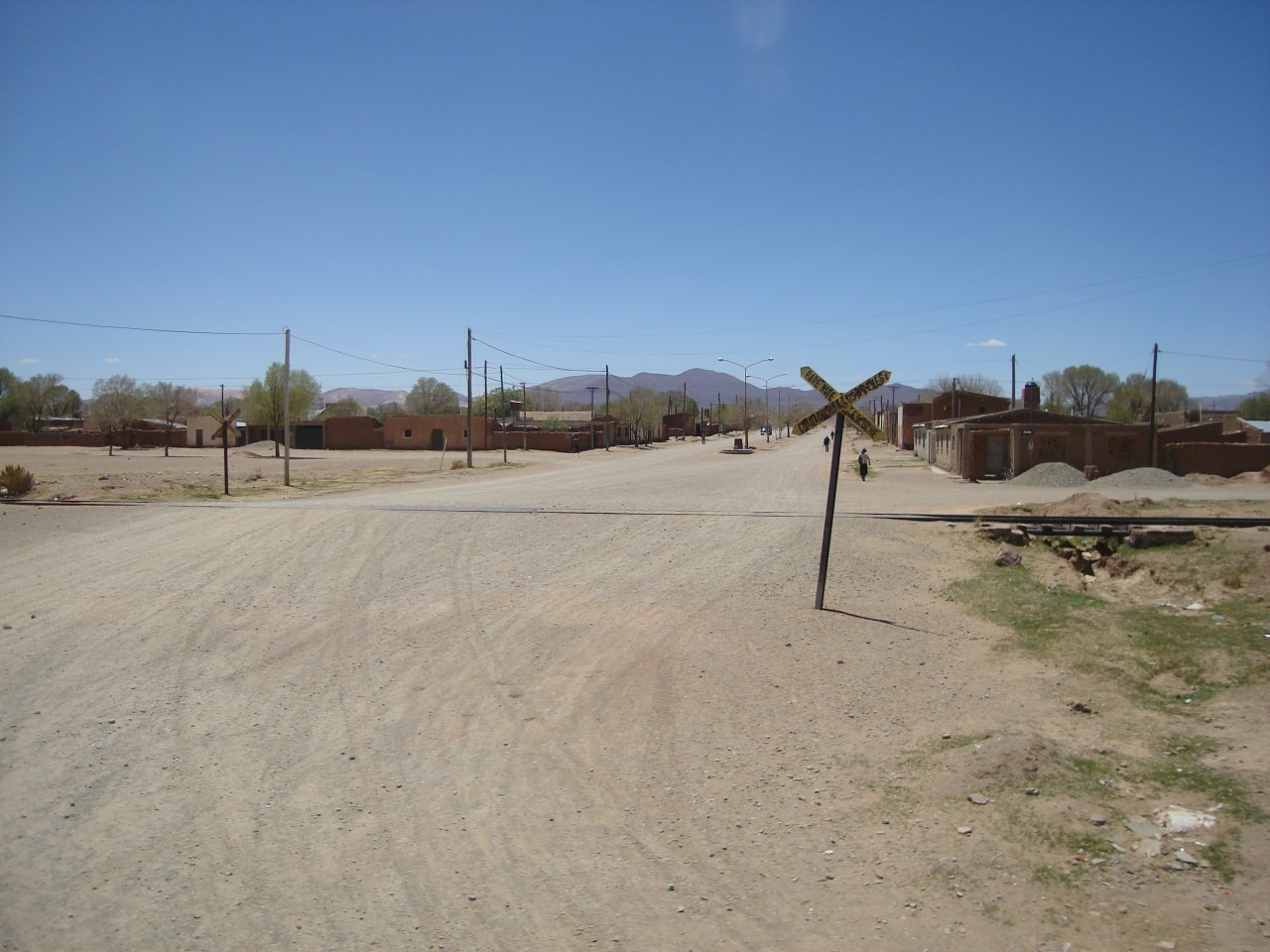
- A level crossing in Abra Pampa

- Country: Argentina
- Province: Jujuy Province
- Department: Cochinoca
- Established: 30 August 1883

Population
  - Total: 9,425
- Population
- Time zone: UTC−3 (ART)
- Postcode: Y4640
- Area code: 03887
- Climate: BSk

Abra Pampa is a town and municipality in Jujuy Province in Argentina, and is the capital of the Department of Cochinoca. The city is the economic center and communication of the Puna, it is the second town in importance in the region, after La Quiaca which is 73 km to the north by the Ruta Nacional 9, paved road, which also connects with the provincial capital, 224 km away.

== History ==
The city was founded on August 31, 1883, in the department of Cochinoca 22 km east of the ancient village of Cochinoca. In 1915 it moved to the old village of Puna in its political functions as departmental capital.

== Climate ==
Typical for this region of the Altiplano, Abra Pampa has a cool semi-arid climate (Köppen BSk) with two distinct seasons. Throughout the year, afternoon temperatures range form comfortable to warm, but diurnal temperature ranges are very large due to the hot sun and thin air. There is a partly cloudy, thundery wet season with mornings that are merely chilly between December and March, and a rainless, cloudless dry season with freezing to frigid mornings from April to November. The clearest month is July; the cloudiest month is January; and the wettest month is February. In spite of being in the tropics, the extreme diurnals make average winter nights resemble those of the upper Nordics and the Great Plains of North America.

In 1981-1990, the average annual minimum temperature was −2.4 °C or 27.7 °F, and the village endures an average of 67 mornings per year with daily minimum temperature at or below −12 °C or 10.4 °F. The coldest months of the year are June and July, with an average low temperature of −11 °C or 12.2 °F and −12 °C or 10.4 °F respectively. The warmest month of the year is December with an average maximum temperature of 21.1 °C or 70.0 °F.

Climate data for Abra Pampa, Elevation: 3,484 metres or 11,430 feet. (1981-1990, extremes 1971-1990)
Month	Jan	Feb	Mar	Apr	May	Jun	Jul	Aug	Sep	Oct	Nov	Dec	Year
Record high °C (°F)	26.0 (78.8)	27.0 (80.6)	26.0 (78.8)	24.0 (75.2)	23.0 (73.4)	20.0 (68.0)	22.0 (71.6)	24.0 (75.2)	24.0 (75.2)	26.5 (79.7)	27.5 (81.5)	27.0 (80.6)	27.5 (81.5)
Mean daily maximum °C (°F)	20.4 (68.7)	19.4 (66.9)	19.8 (67.6)	19.1 (66.4)	16.4 (61.5)	14.0 (57.2)	14.3 (57.7)	17.0 (62.6)	18.8 (65.8)	20.9 (69.6)	21.4 (70.5)	21.1 (70.0)	18.5 (65.3)
Daily mean °C (°F)	13.0 (55.4)	11.9 (53.4)	12.0 (53.6)	9.5 (49.1)	4.8 (40.6)	2.1 (35.8)	1.9 (35.4)	5.3 (41.5)	8.2 (46.8)	10.9 (51.6)	12.3 (54.1)	12.9 (55.2)	8.7 (47.7)
Mean daily minimum °C (°F)	5.9 (42.6)	5.2 (41.4)	4.1 (39.4)	−1.6 (29.1)	−8.2 (17.2)	−11.0 (12.2)	−12.0 (10.4)	−9.4 (15.1)	−6.1 (21.0)	−1.9 (28.6)	1.9 (35.4)	4.5 (40.1)	−2.4 (27.7)
Record low °C (°F)	−3.0 (26.6)	−2.0 (28.4)	−5.0 (23.0)	−10.0 (14.0)	−16.0 (3.2)	−18.5 (−1.3)	−23.0 (−9.4)	−19.0 (−2.2)	−18.0 (−0.4)	−12.0 (10.4)	−9.5 (14.9)	−5.0 (23.0)	−23.0 (−9.4)
Average precipitation mm (inches)	94.3 (3.71)	89.4 (3.52)	79.7 (3.14)	8.1 (0.32)	0.0 (0.0)	0.0 (0.0)	0.0 (0.0)	0.2 (0.01)	0.9 (0.04)	4.6 (0.18)	35.0 (1.38)	71.9 (2.83)	387.6 (15.26)
Average precipitation days	11	11	8	2	0	0	0	0.1	0.1	2	5	9	48.2
Average relative humidity (%)	66	65	62	50	41	40	36	38	35	43	53	60	49
Mean monthly sunshine hours	257.3	233.7	254.2	270.0	282.1	264.0	285.2	291.4	285.0	291.4	279.0	266.6	3,259.9
Percentage possible sunshine	62	64	67	77	82	82	84	82	79	74	70	64	74
Source: SMN: Estación Meteorológica Abra Pampa - Período 1981–1990

== Population ==
The 2001 INDEC census found 7,496 inhabitants in urban areas and 9,425 inhabitants in the entire municipality.
