= Comechingón language =

Argentinian extinct language

Comechingón
- Native to: Argentina
- Region: Cordoba Province (Argentina), San Luis Province
- Ethnicity: Comechingón
- Extinct: 17th century
- Language family: unclassified (Huarpean? Cacán?): Comechingón
- Dialects: Henia; Camiare

Language codes
- ISO 639-3: None (mis)
- Glottolog: None
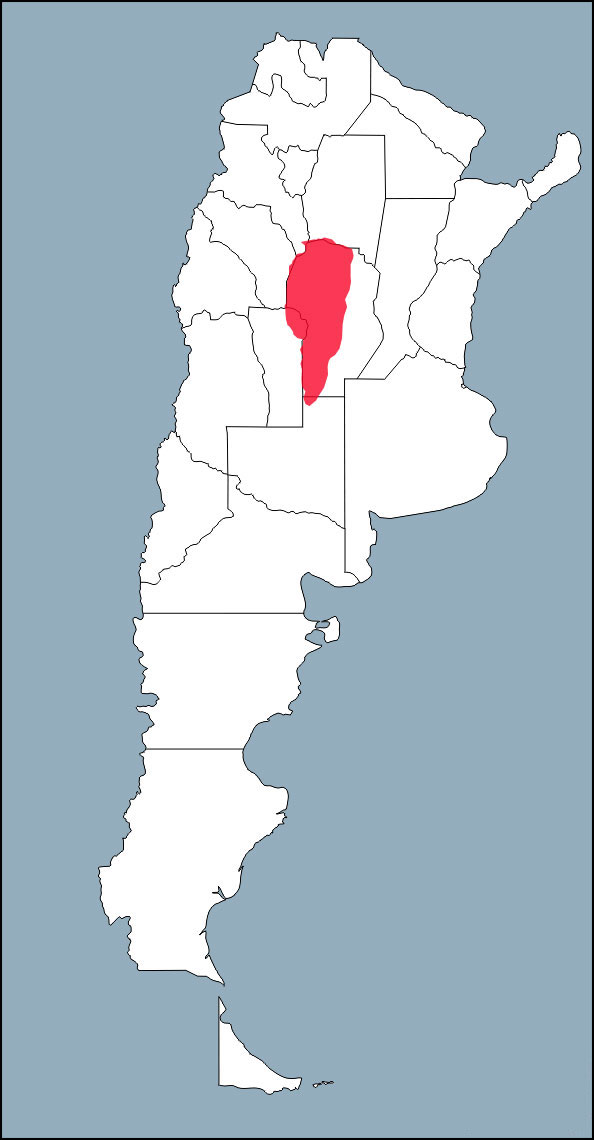
- Pre-contact distribution of Comechingón

Comechingón is an extinct language, formerly spoken in Argentina by the Comechingón. It is poorly attested, with only a few words known with confidence. It is believed to be either a member of the Huarpean languages, or be related to Cacán. Links have also been made with the supposed language isolate Sanavirón. The absence of Comechingón language data makes determination of its true linguistic affinity impossible.

Comechingón is considered to have two dialects, corresponding to the two subdivisions of the Comechingón people, Henia and Camiare.

Comechingón is believed to have exerted an influence on the Cordobés Spanish dialect currently found where it once was spoken.

== Vocabulary ==
Loukotka (1968) lists one vocabulary word for the Henia dialect:

English	Henia
bird	lemin (Note: actually the word for '(caught) fish')

The following are some roots without any known meaning:

Henia	Camiare
	canta
	chita
cavi	
quili	cala
tala, cala	olma
	chili
	chira
toc, toco (Note: because loc toc was a surname in Guaypulo)	loc, toc
pitin	
	pira
canta	canta, cante
pichi	
	toc

Some more Comechingón words with meanings:

English	Henia	Camiare
village (Note: Not in the sense of city, but rather in that of an ayllu.)	henen, henin, (Note: with different dialectal forms) hen, pitin	
cacique	naguan, acan, nave	nave, navira
fish	lemin	luimin
house	butos	
landmark ?	tica	
river	san	
nipple ?	chi	
boulder ?	cara	
