= Abralaite =

Coordinates: 23.2°S 65.78334°W

- Rural municipality and village
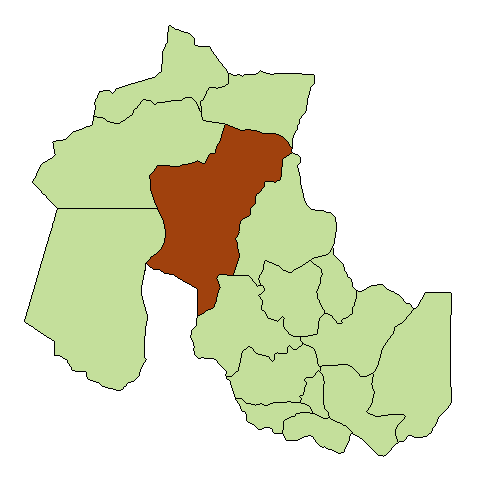
- Country: Argentina
- Province: Jujuy Province
- Department: Cochinoca
- Established: 1919

Government
  - President of the Municipal Commission: Rubén Baleriano Farfan
- Elevation: 13,250 ft (4,040 m)

Population (2001)
  - Total: 53
- Population
- Time zone: UTC−3 (ART)
- Postcode: Y4634
- Area code: 03887
- Climate: BWk

Abralaite is a rural municipality and village in Jujuy Province in Argentina. Houses built of adobe with thatched roofs characterize its appearance, the local economy is characterized by the production and breeding of camelid llamas, and sheep and there are also gardens and greenhouses.

== Population ==
The population stood at 53 inhabitants as of 2001 of which 52.95% are females and 47.05% are males.
