= Humahuaca language =

Extinct unclassified language of Argentina

Humahuaca
- Omaguaca
- Native to: Argentina
- Region: Jujuy Province
- Extinct: (date missing)
- Language family: unclassified

Language codes
- ISO 639-3: None (mis)
- Linguist List: 1nm
- Glottolog: None

Humahuaca (Omaguaca) is an extinct language of Argentina. Tribal and possibly dialect divisions were Fiscara, Jujuy, Ocloya, Osa, Purmamarca, and Tiliar. Mason (1950) proposed that Humahuaca was related to Diaguita (Cacán) and Kunza in a group he called "Ataguitan".

== Varieties ==
Varieties classified by Loukotka (1968) as part of the Humahuaca language cluster:

- Humahuaca or Omaguaca - extinct language once spoken in the valleys of Tilcara and Humahuaca, Jujuy Province, Argentina.
- Ocloya - once spoken in Jujuy Province on the "Normente River" and near Necay.
- Jujui - once spoken around the city of Jujuy. (Unattested)
- Casavindo - once spoken around the city of Casabindo, Jujuy Province. (Unattested)
- Cochinoca - once spoken near the city of Cochinoca, Jujuy Province. (Unattested)
- Churumata - once spoken by the northwestern neighbors of the Humahuaca tribe. (Unattested)

== See also ==
- Churumatas
