= Abdón Castro Tolay =

Coordinates: 23°22′S 66°04′W

- Rural municipality and village
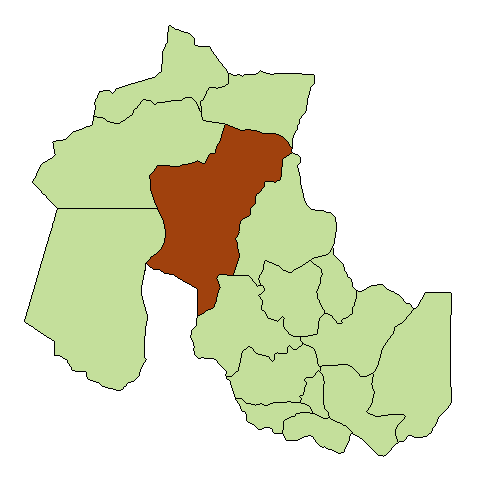
- Interactive map of Abdón Castro Tolay
- Country: Argentina
- Province: Jujuy Province
- Department: Cochinoca
- Established: 1919

Government
  - Village President: Asiscio Puca

Population
  - Total: 229
- Population
- Time zone: UTC−3 (ART)
- Postcode: Y4641
- Area code: 03887
- Climate: BWk

Abdón Castro Tolay is a rural municipality and village in the Cochinoca department in Jujuy Province in Argentina. It was founded in October 1919. Its main activity is the raising of llamas and sheep.

== Features ==
Abdón Castro Tolay, formerly Barrancas, is a place of enormous natural walls that preserve cave paintings and petroglyphs. The town, which bears the name of a teacher who dedicated his life to the community, is on provincial route RP 75. The main activity of the town is the breeding of sheep and llamas. There is a garment making spinning mill and regional products, which have revived the previously paralyzed economy. Before, a cooperative of artisans provided blankets to schools in la Puna, a project which sees the active participation of families from other Jujuy towns.

There is a primary school, Secondary School No. 13, a First Aid Center, a public library and a Sportscenter, the Neighborhood Center is named Sargento Cabral, the town square is named 9 de Julio and the cultural sports club is called la Inca. As for religious activity, there is an evangelical and a Catholic church.

== Demography ==
- Population in 1991: 199 inhabitants (INDEC).
- Population in 2001: 229 inhabitants (INDEC), of which 51.10% are women and 48.90% are men.
- Population in 2011: 250 inhabitants approximately. According to the La Hora newspaper of Jujuy.

== Photo gallery ==
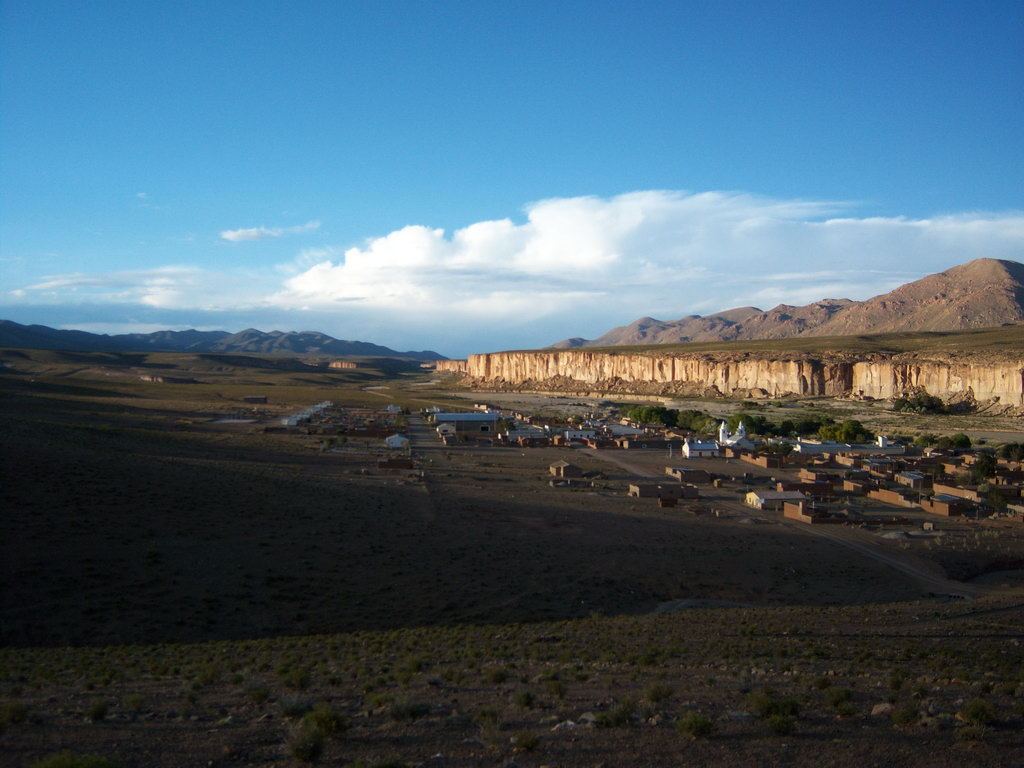
View of the Village of Abdón Castro Tolay

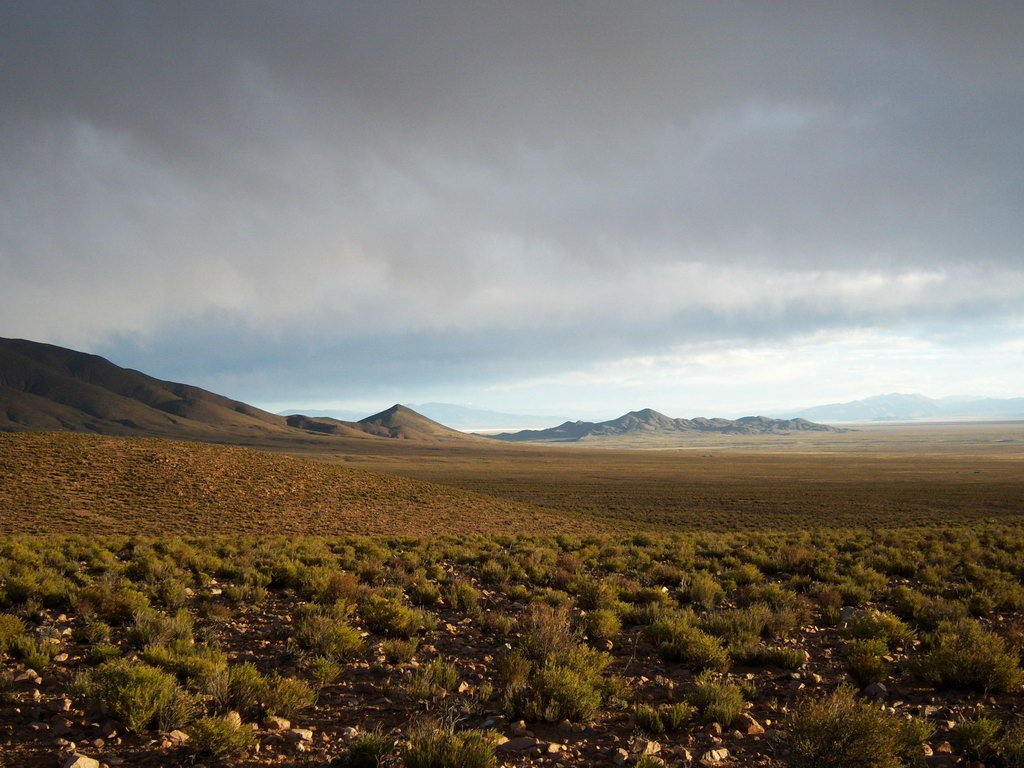
View of the nearby countryside landscape near the village of Abdón Castro Tolay

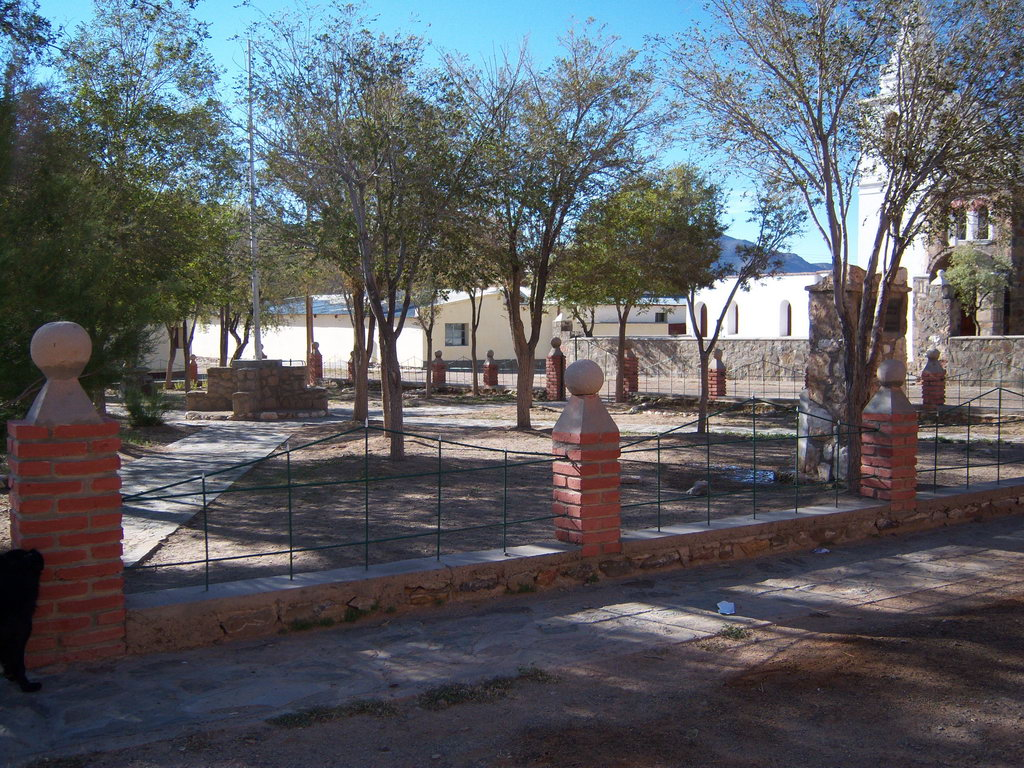
Barrancas Central Plaza

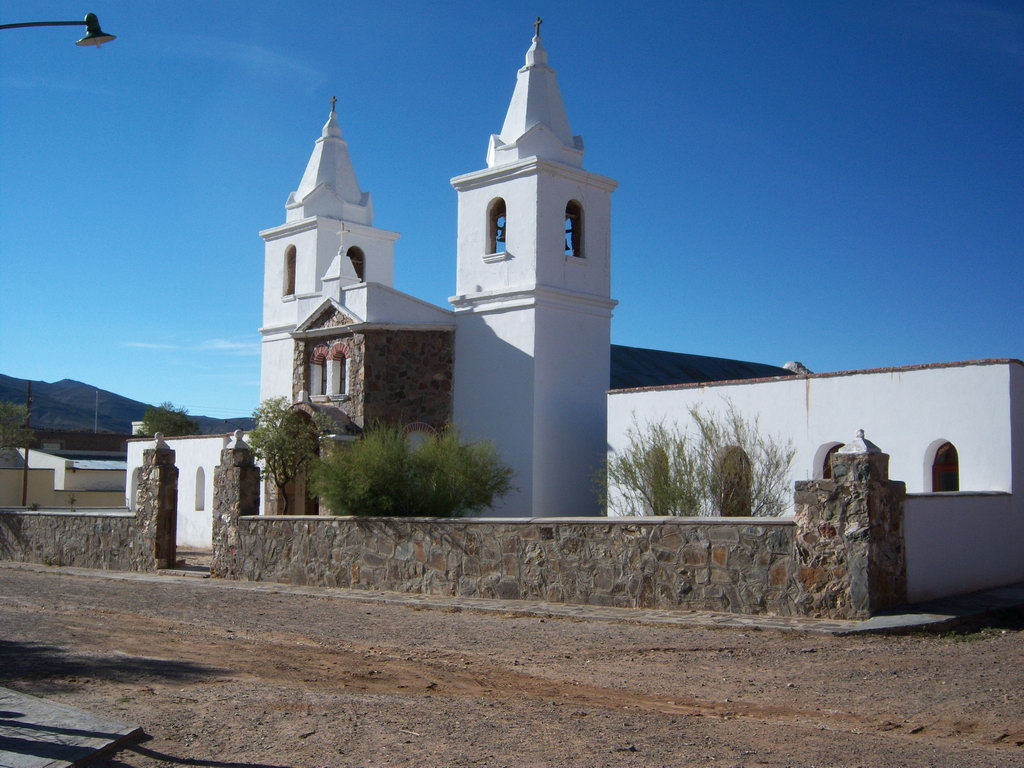
Front of the Church in Barrancas

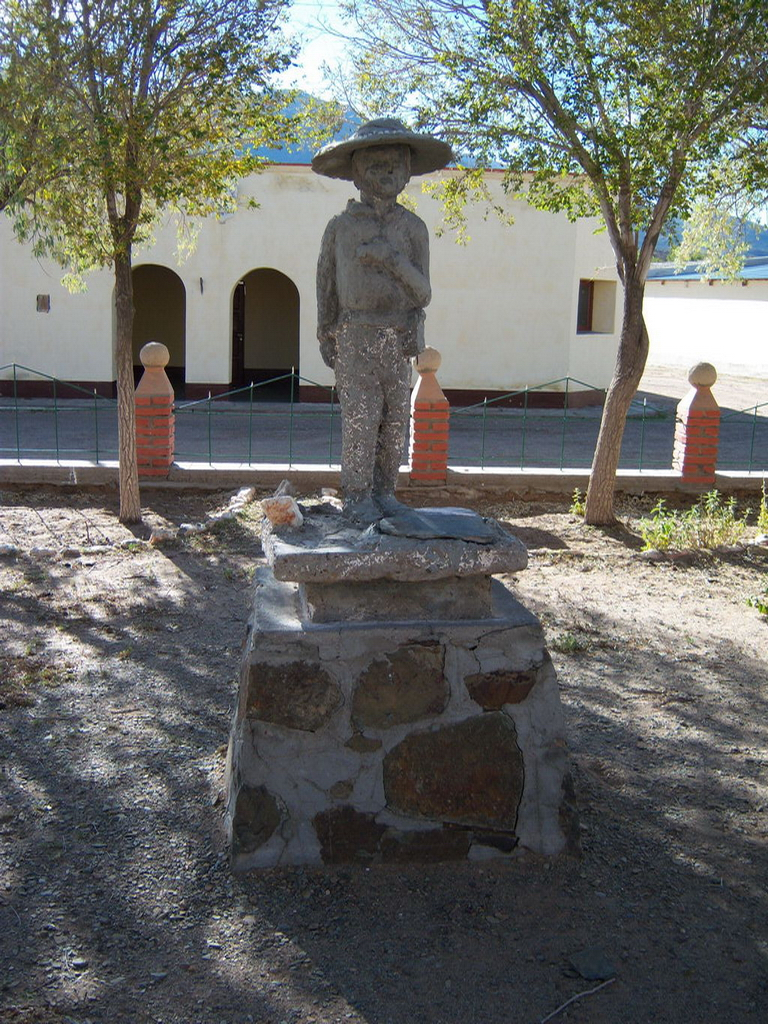
Statue in Barrancas square

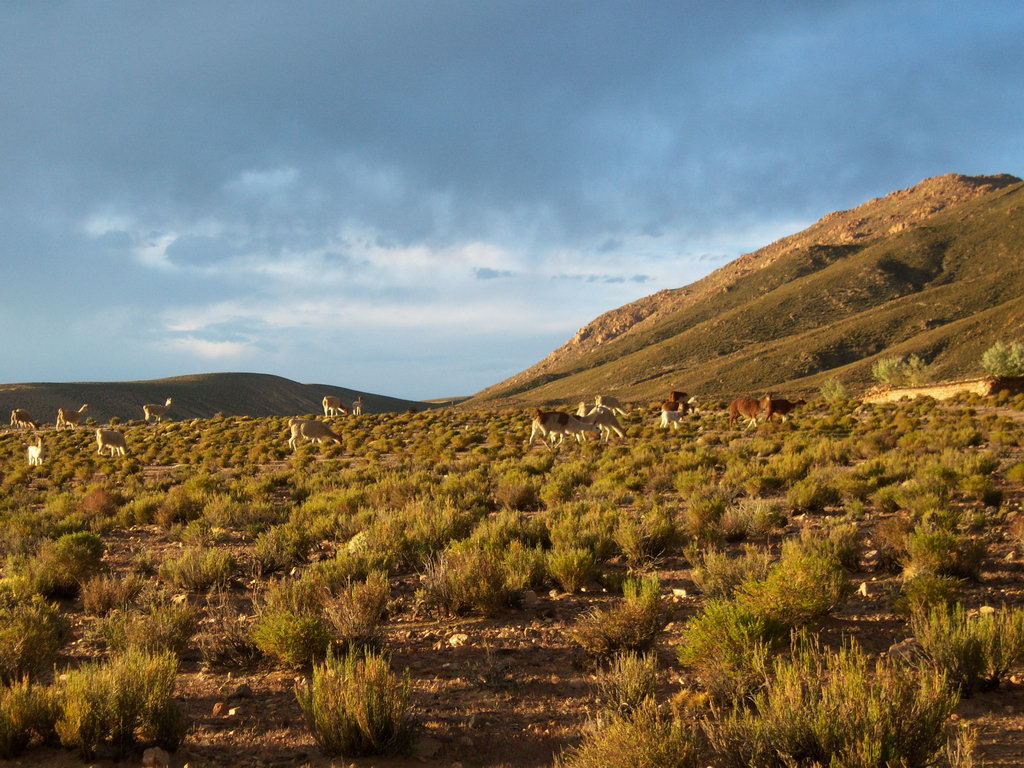
Countryside near to the village of Barrancas
