= Lule people =

Lules
- Flag of the Lule people

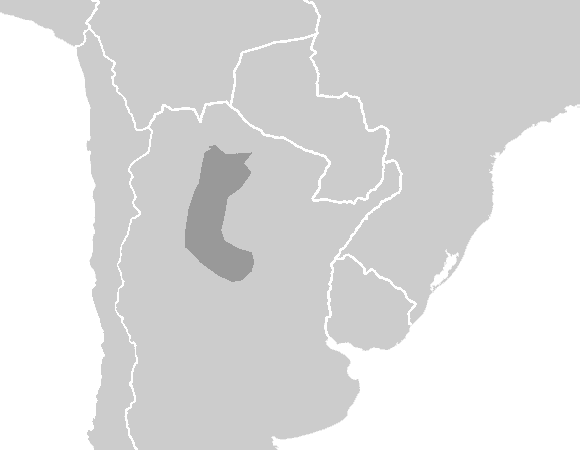
- Approximate pre-contact distribution of the Lule-Vilelan language family.

Total population
- 3,721 (2010)

Languages
- Lule language

Related ethnic groups
- Tonocotés, Vilelas

The Lule people, or Lules, are an indigenous people in Argentina. They were originally encountered in the area that is now the Salta Province of Argentina, as well as in nearby areas of modern-day Bolivia and Paraguay. They were later displaced by the Wichí toward the south of Salta Province, the north-east of Santiago del Estero Province, and eastern Tucumán Province. The Lule language is distantly related to the Vilela language, and together they form the Lule-Vilela language family. Today, 3,721 people in Argentina claim Lule ethnic affiliation, according to the 2010 census.

== History ==
The Lules lived in the same region as the Vilela, and shared many cultural characteristics despite linguistic differences. They also had relationships with the Tonocoté and the Mataraes. The Lule people were made up of the following groups: Esistiné, Tokistiné, Oristiné, Axostiné, Tamboriné, Guaxastiné, and Casutiné.

The Lules were generally hunter-gatherers and therefore lived a nomadic lifestyle. However, they also cultivated a wide variety of plants for food, including maize, calabaza, potato, and quinoa. Sedentary populations settled down on the western edges of the modern-day city of Salta. In these settlements, a clear Andean influence on their culture and way of life can be established. One major example of this Andean cultural influence is the domestication of animals in the lamini family for use as pack animals and for the production of wool and meat.

In order to convert them to Christianity, the Jesuits founded a mission near San Isidro de Lules in Tucumán province in 1670. This mission remained active until 1768, when the Jesuits were expelled. During the mission's existence, it often traded and sold the Lule and Diaguita indigenous population of the area to members of the landed oligarchy, plantations, and colonial workshops.

In 1708, Esteban de Urízar, the governor of Tucumán, carried out a punitive campaign against the indigenous peoples of the Gran Chaco, including the Lules. Following that campaign, Jesuits from Salta established a mission, San Juan Bautista de Balbuena, next to Fort Balbuena. The mission was home to 400 Lules, primarily from the Esistiné and Tokistiné groups. On August 7, 1715, Father Antonio Machoni moved the mission to Fort Miraflores, establishing the mission of San Esteban de Miraflores on the banks of the Salado River. Thirteen years later, in 1728, natives destroyed the mission in a rebellion; the Lules left the mission and dispersed throughout the land. In 1752, the mission was restored but in a different location, 170 kilometres (110 miles) to the south-east of the city of Salta. After the Jesuits were expelled in 1768, the mission passed into Franciscan control, but it became permanently abandoned by the turn of the nineteenth century.

== Today ==
The descendants of the Lules have partly, but incompletely, mixed and acculturated into the predominantly white population and culture of Argentina. In the following settlements, there are a number of residents who identify themselves as belonging to the Lule people:

- Las Costas, Salta Province (250 families)
- El Retiro, Santiago del Estero Province
- El Nogalito, Lules Department, Tucumán Province (80 families)
- Mala Mala, Lules Department, Tucumán Province (25 families)
- El Siambón, Tafí Viejo Department, Tucumán Province (45 families)
- La Oyada, Tafí Viejo Department, Tucumán Province (15 families)

The 2004-2005 Complementary Indigenous Survey identified 854 Argentines of first-generation Lule descent. The 2010 Argentine Census identified 3,721 individuals who identified as being of Lule ethnicity.
