= Vilela language =

Nearly extinct language of Argentina

Vilela
- Waka
- Native to: Argentina
- Region: eastern Chaco
- Ethnicity: Vilela (Wakambabelte)
- Native speakers: 2 semispeakers (2007)
- Language family: Isolate: Vilela
- Dialects: Ocol; Chunupi; Sinipi

Language codes
- ISO 639-3: vil
- Glottolog: vile1241
- ELP: Vilela
- Map of the Vilela language

- Vilela is classified as Extinct by the UNESCO Atlas of the World's Languages in Danger

Vilela (Waka, Atalalá, Chulupí~Chunupí) is a moribund and possibly extinct language last spoken in the Resistencia area of Argentina and in the eastern Chaco near the Paraguayan border. Dialects were Ocol, Chinipi, Sinipi; only Ocol survives. The Vilela people call themselves Wakambabelte (/wɑqhambaβelte/) 'Waka speakers'. There were 2 semispeakers as of 2007.

== History ==
Jesuit missionaries made their way into the Gran Chaco of South America region around the 17th-century. Their goal was to introduce the indigenous populations (including the Vilela people, which was really the general name of a conglomerate of many different groups of indigenous peoples) to Christian practices and convert them to Christianity. This assimilation of the Vilela people and their languages, practices, and religions contributed to the extinction of the Vilela language and the abandonment of Vilela traditions and practices, largely due to how some Vilela people were made to co-exist with the colonists through the encomienda forced-labor system granted by the Spanish Crown. The last Vilela people were absorbed into the surrounding Toba people and Spanish-speaking townsfolk.

== Dialects ==
Loukotka (1968) lists the following varieties of Vilela.

- Chunupi - formerly spoken on the confluence of the San Francisco River and Bermejo River in the vicinity of La Encrucijada, Valtolema, Ortega, Esquina Grande and Laguna Colma.
- Pasain - formerly spoken in the vicinity of Macapillo, Argentine Chaco.
- Ocole - formerly spoken between Lacangayá and Laguna Colma.
- Omoampa - formerly spoken from Ortega as far as Miraflores.
- Macomita - once spoken west of the Juramento River, province of Santiago del Estero, Argentina.
- Yecoamita - once spoken northwest of the Teuco River, Formosa province.
- Sinipi - formerly spoken on the Bermejo River in the vicinity of Lacangayá.

== Phonology ==
Vilela appears to have the five vowels /a e i o u/ of Spanish and approximately the following consonants:

		Labial	Alveolar	Palatal	Velar	Uvular	Glottal
Nasal		m	n				
Plosive	voiced	b	d	dʒ	ɡ	ɢ	
Plosive	voiceless	p	t	tʃ	k	q	ʔ
Plosive	ejective	pʼ	tʼ	tʃʼ	kʼ	qʼ	
Fricative	central	f	s	ʃ	x		h
Fricative	lateral		ɬ				
Approximant		w	l	j			
Rhotic			r, ɾ				

There is a lack of distinction between the voiceless alveolar consonant /t/ and the voiceless velar consonant /k/ in spoken Vilela. For example, in the word [huanokol] 'dog', [k] could be pronounced as /k/ or /t/. The sounds may even alternate within the same word. This alternation appears to occur not only in casual speech, but also in formal speech. Although this alternation occurs, [k] tends to predominate.

Open Language Archives Community (OLAC) has approximately 34 audio logs of the Vilela language being spoken in interviews. The audio logs consist of numbers, commands, and other aspects of the spoken language.

== Typology ==
The Vilela language is described as a head-marking language, meaning that the grammatical relationship is addressed at the beginning of the sentence rather than the start of the sentence focusing on the dependents.
