= Rinconadillas =

Coordinates: 23°25′S 65°55′W

- Rural municipality and village
- Interactive map of Rinconadillas
- Country: Argentina
- Province: Jujuy Province
- Time zone: UTC−3 (ART)

Rinconadillas is a rural municipality and village in Jujuy Province in Argentina.
