= Sanavirón language =

Extinct language of Argentina

Sanavirón
- Native to: Argentina
- Region: Salinas Grandes
- Ethnicity: Sanavirones
- Extinct: (date missing)
- Language family: unclassified (isolate?)

Language codes
- ISO 639-3: None (mis)
- Glottolog: sana1301
- Map of the Sanavirón language

Sanavirón is an extinct and unclassified language once spoken near the Salinas Grandes in Córdoba, Argentina. Loukotka (1968) classified it as a language isolate, but there is insufficient data to justify this according to Campbell (2012, 2024). Previous classifications have linked it with Comechingón, Cacán, or Lule–Vilela. Despite its status as a lengua general during the Spanish colonial administration, very little is known of it, only about six or seven words.

== Vocabulary ==
Some words in Sanavirón:

gloss	Sanavirón
pueblo (Note: Not in the sense of city, but rather in that of an ayllu.)	sacat
chief	charaba
algarrobo	tolo
water	para
irrigation ditch	mampa
house of the sun	sololasta

Some roots with unknown meaning:

Sanavirón
ascon, asco
talaló (Note: A surname from the region of Ascochinga)
bilis
camin, cami
quili, quilo
cala
ani
cavi
chin, sin
canta
guanu

It was also documented that the word Comechingón meant 'subterranean caves' in Sanaviron and segmented as come chingon.
