= Huarpe =

Indigenous people of Argentina

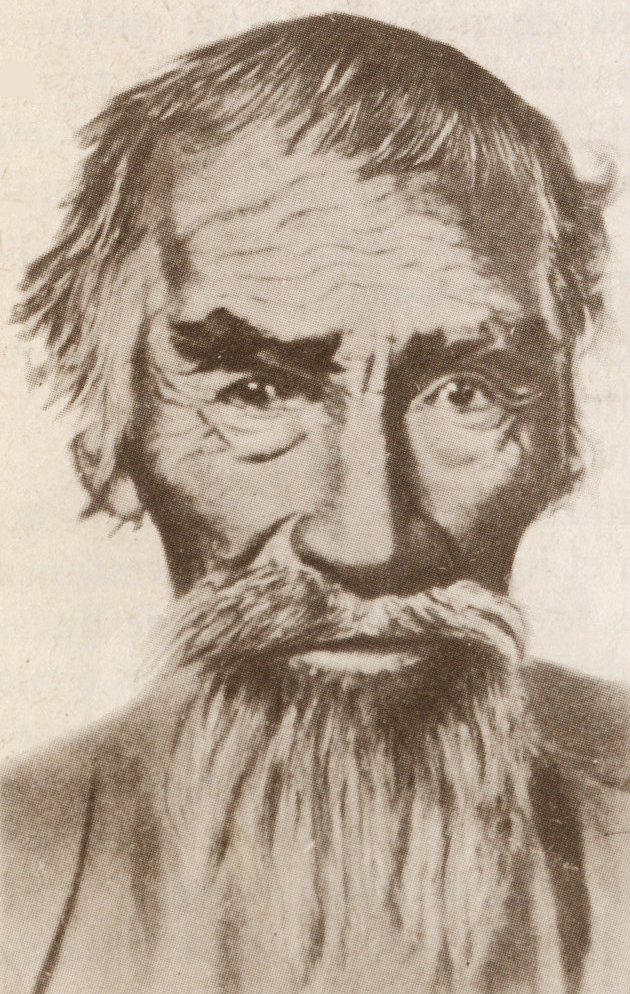
- Member of the Milkayak Huarpe ethnicity

Regions with significant populations
- Argentina (Cuyo)
- Argentina: 34,279

Languages
- Spanish; formerly Quechua and Huarpe

Religion
- traditional tribal religion

The Huarpes or Warpes are an Indigenous people of Argentina, living in the Cuyo region. Some scholars assume that in the Huarpe language, this word means "sandy ground", but according to Arte y Vocabulario de la lengua general del Reino de Chile, written by Andrés Febrés in Lima in 1765, the word Cuyo comes from Araucanian cuyum puulli, meaning "sandy land" or "desert country".

== History ==
Huarpe people settled in permanent villages beginning in the 5th century CE. About 50 to 100 people lived in a village, making them smaller than Diaguita settlements. They were agrarian people who grew corn (Zea mays), beans, squash, and quinoa (Chenopodium quinoa). Towards the 15th century, Huarpe territory expanded into the current Argentinian provinces of San Luis, Mendoza and San Juan and even on the north of the Neuquen Province. They inhabited between the Jáchal River at north, to the Diamante River at south and between the Andes and Conlara Valley on San Luis. They were never fully part of the Incan Empire, but were influenced by Inca culture and adopted llama ranching and the Quechua language after 1480.

Chilean encomenderos who had encomiendas in Cuyo introduced Indigenous Huarpes to Chile, whom they hired to other Spaniards without encomiendas.
