= San Francisco de Alfarcito =

Coordinates: 23°35′S 65°21′W

- Rural municipality and village
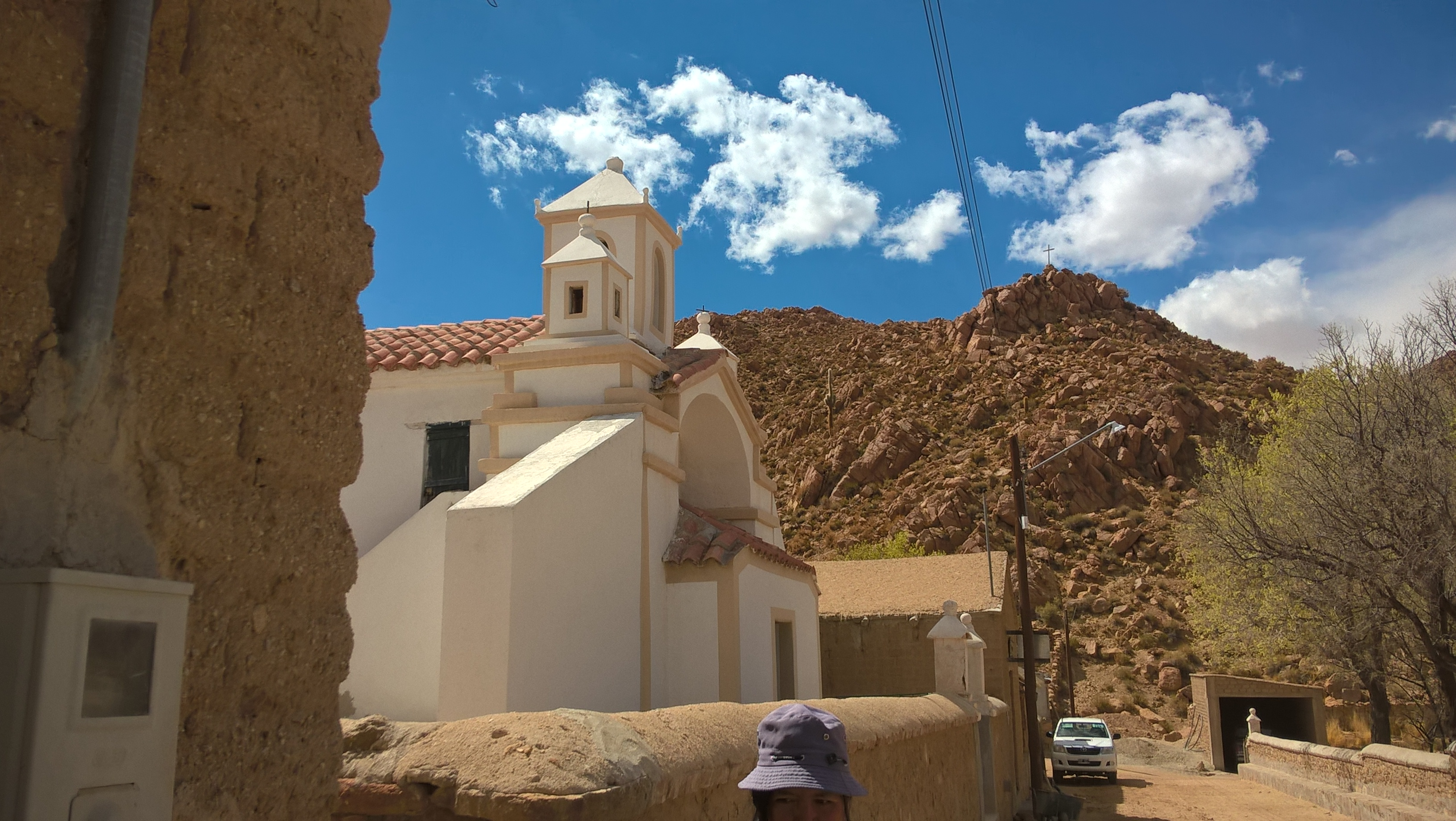
- Church of San Francisco de Alfarcito
- Interactive map of San Francisco de Alfarcito
- Country: Argentina
- Province: Jujuy Province
- Time zone: UTC−3 (ART)

San Francisco de Alfarcito is a rural municipality and village in Jujuy Province in Argentina.
