= Tusaquillas =

Coordinates: 23°12′S 66°03′W

- Rural municipality and village
- Interactive map of Tusaquillas
- Country: Argentina
- Province: Jujuy Province
- Time zone: UTC−3 (ART)

Tusaquillas is a rural municipality and village in Jujuy Province in Argentina.
