= Santuario de Tres Pozos =

Coordinates: 23°31′57″S 65°57′49″W

- Rural municipality and village
- Interactive map of Santuario de Tres Pozos
- Country: Argentina
- Province: Jujuy Province
- Time zone: UTC−3 (ART)

Santuario de Tres Pozos is a rural municipality and village in Jujuy Province in Argentina.
