= Vilela people =

Indigenous people in Argentina

Vilelas
Waqha-umbaꞵelte
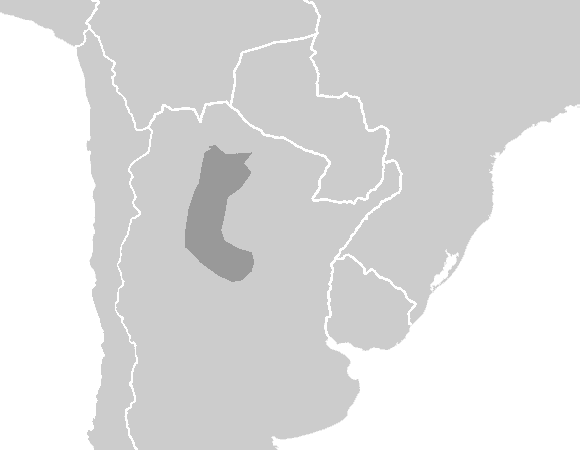
- Approximate pre-contact distribution of the Lule-Vilelan language family.

Total population
- 519 (2010)

Languages
- Vilela language

Related ethnic groups
- Tonocotés, Lules

The Vilela people, or Vilelas, are an Indigenous people in Argentina. Today, their few remaining descendants live primarily in the provinces of Chaco and Santiago del Estero, with smaller numbers in the Rosario and Buenos Aires urban areas. In the province of Chaco, the Vilelas live together with the Toba (or Qom) people in communities such as the Colonia Aborigen Chaco (Chaco Aboriginal Colony). They also reside in rural areas and at the periphery of large cities such as Resistencia, Sáenz Peña, Machagai, and Quitilipi. In Santiago del Estero Province, the Vilela people live in their own communities as well as in communities shared with the Lule people, with whom they are closely related and share a language family.

== History ==
The Vilela people refer to themselves by the endonym uakambalelté, or waqha-umbael-te, both of which translate to "those who speak Waqha" in their native Vilela language, which they refer to as Waqha. The language is subdivided into three dialects, chinipi, sinipi, and ocol. Ocol, with only a handful of current speakers, is the only dialect which survives to this day.

Similarly to the Lules, the Vilelas had a culture intermediate between those of the indigenous peoples of the Andes, the Pampas, and the Cuyo region. By the fifteenth century, they had established themselves in the north of today's Tucumán and Santiago del Estero provinces, as well as the east and southeast of the Salta Province. They were nomadic and sustained themselves through hunting and gathering. They hunted the peccary, and harvested carob and honey.

After the Spanish conquest of the Tucumán region, the Vilelas moved eastward, into the eastern and southeastern parts of the Gran Chaco. At that time, they were made up of the following subgroups: chunupí, pazaine, atalala, omoampa, yeconoampa, vacaa, chole, ipa, and yooc (or guamalca). During the seventeenth and eighteenth centuries, the Guaycuru peoples successfully domesticated the horse, which they used for hunting, transportation, and waging war. This allowed them to expand their region of influence, forcing the Vilelas to move even further east, toward the Paraná River.

The Jesuits founded three missions in Vilela lands, lasting until the Jesuit expulsion of 1767-1768:

- San José de las Petacas, founded in 1735.
- Nuestra Señora del Pilar, founded in 1763.
- Nuestra Señora del Buen Consejo, founded in 1763.

The last Vilela cacique, or chief, in the Chaco region, known as Leoncito, lived near the city of Resistencia during the mid-nineteenth century.

== Today ==
With few exceptions, the Vilela people no longer speak their native language, instead primarily speaking Spanish, with some speakers of Toba (Qom).

The 2004-2005 Complementary Indigenous Survey did not identify the Vilela people; however, the 2010 Argentine Census identified 519 people of Vilela heritage in Argentina, 359 of them in the province of Santiago del Estero.
