= Puesto del Marqués =

Coordinates: 22°32′S 65°41′W

- Rural municipality and village
- Interactive map of Puesto del Marqués
- Country: Argentina
- Province: Jujuy Province
- Time zone: UTC−3 (ART)

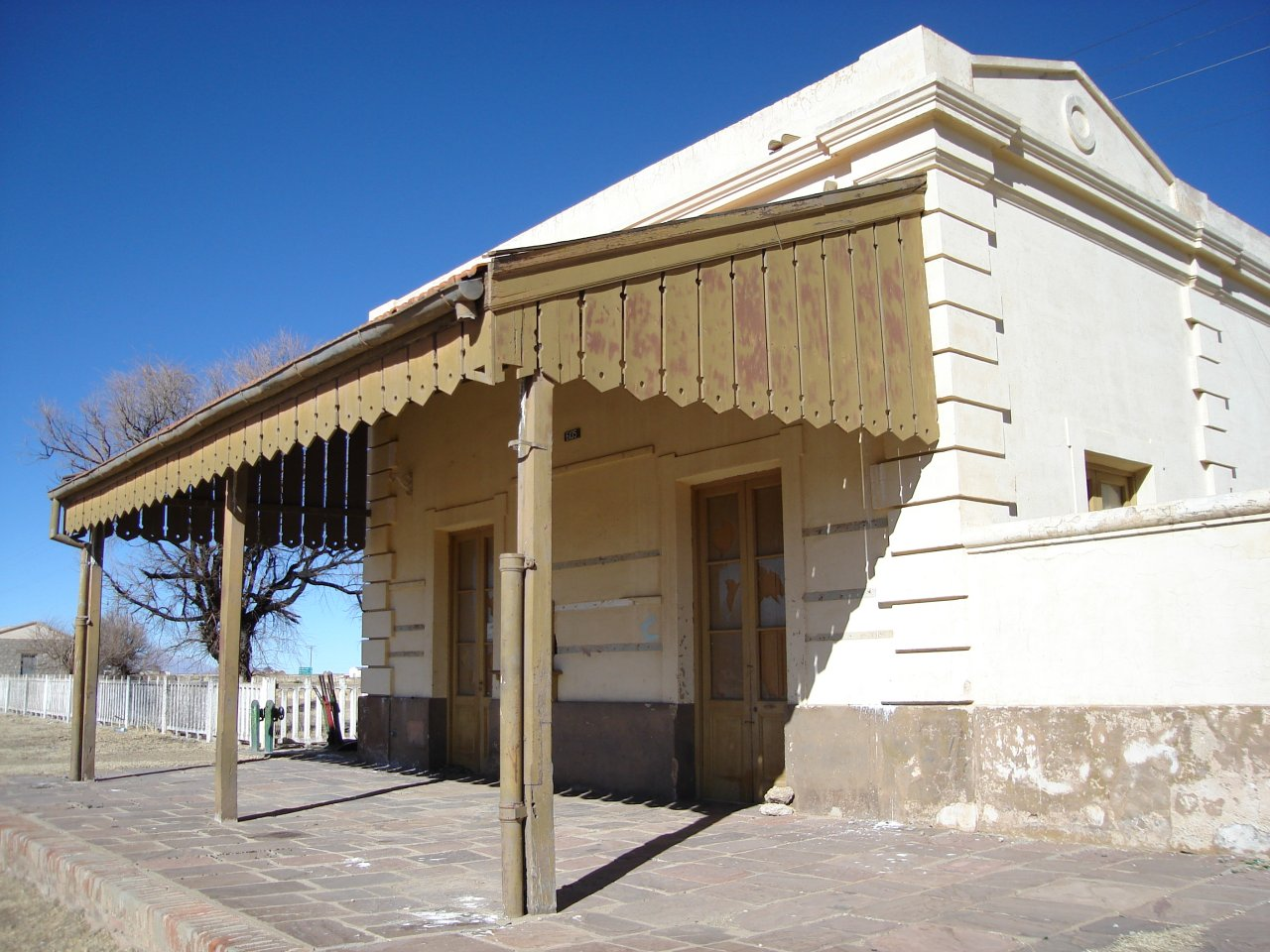

Puesto del Marqués is a rural municipality and village in Jujuy Province in Argentina. It lies along National Route 9, north of the town of Abra Pampa, at an approximate altitude of 3,524 meters (11,561 feet) above sea level.
