= Comechingón =

Group of people indigenous to Argentina

- Flag of the Comechingon people

Total population
- c. 27,509

Regions with significant populations
- Argentina: 27,509 (2022)

Languages
- Comechingón; Spanish

Religion
- Catholicism

Related ethnic groups
- Indigenous peoples of the Americas

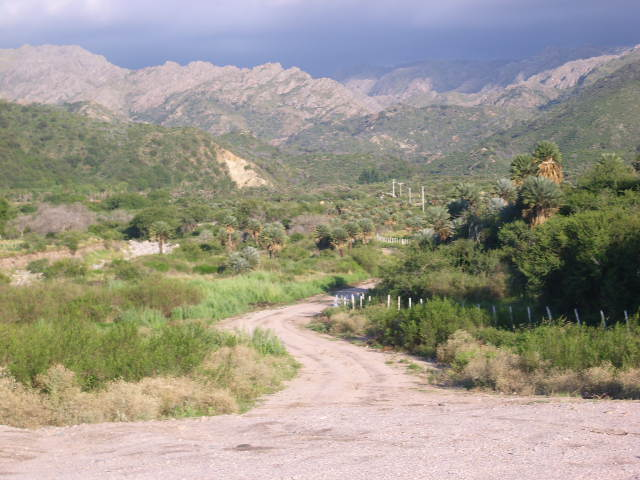
View of the Comechingones Mountains.

Comechingón (plural Comechingones) is the common name for a group of people indigenous to the Argentine provinces of Córdoba and San Luis. By the end of the 17th century, most Comechingones had been killed or displaced by the Spanish conquistadores.

The two main Comechingón groups called themselves Henia (in the north) and Kamiare (in the south), each subdivided into a dozen or so tribes. The name comechingón is a deformation of the pejorative term kamichingan—"cave dwellers"—used by the Sanavirón tribe.

They were sedentary, practiced agriculture yet gathered wild fruits, and raised animals for wool, meat and eggs. Their culture was heavily influenced by that of the Andes.

Several aspects seem to differentiate the Henia-Kamiare from other Amerindians. They had a rather Caucasian appearance, with beards and quite a few of them with greenish eyes. Another distinctive aspect was their communal stone houses, half buried in the ground to endure the cold, wind and snow of the winter.

Their language was lost when Spanish policies favoured Quechua, an indigenous language they transplanted from Upper Peru. Nevertheless, they left a rich pictography and abstract petroglyphs.

A cultural contribution is the vowel extension in the Spanish of the present inhabitants of Córdoba, but also not uncommon in San Luis and other neighbouring provinces.

According to the 2010 census there are 34,546 self-identified Comechingón descendants in Argentina.

== Division ==
- Kamiare (mainly north of San Luis Province)
  - Saleta (western Sierra de Comechingones and Villa de Merlo)
  - Nogolma (west of the Saletas, Valle de Conlara)
  - Michilingüe (the best-known within San Luis; west and south of the previous groups)
- Hênia (mainly the Sierras of the Córdoba Province)
  - Mogas (Sierras de Ambargasta)
  - Caminigas (south of the Mogas)
  - Gualas or Guachas (south of Caminigas)
  - Chine (west of Gualas)
  - Sitón (Valle de Punilla, eastern Sierra Chica)
  - Aluleta (western Sierra Chica, Valle de Paravachasca, and southern Valle de Punilla)
  - Naure (southern and central Valle de Traslasierra; north of Saleta and Nogolma)
  - Macaclita (Valle de Calamuchita, eastern Sierras de Comechingones down to Río Cuarto)

== See also ==
- Indigenous peoples of Argentina
