= Casabindo =

Coordinates: 22°58′S 66°04′W

- Rural municipality and village
- Interactive map of Casabindo
- Country: Argentina
- Province: Jujuy Province
- Time zone: UTC−3 (ART)

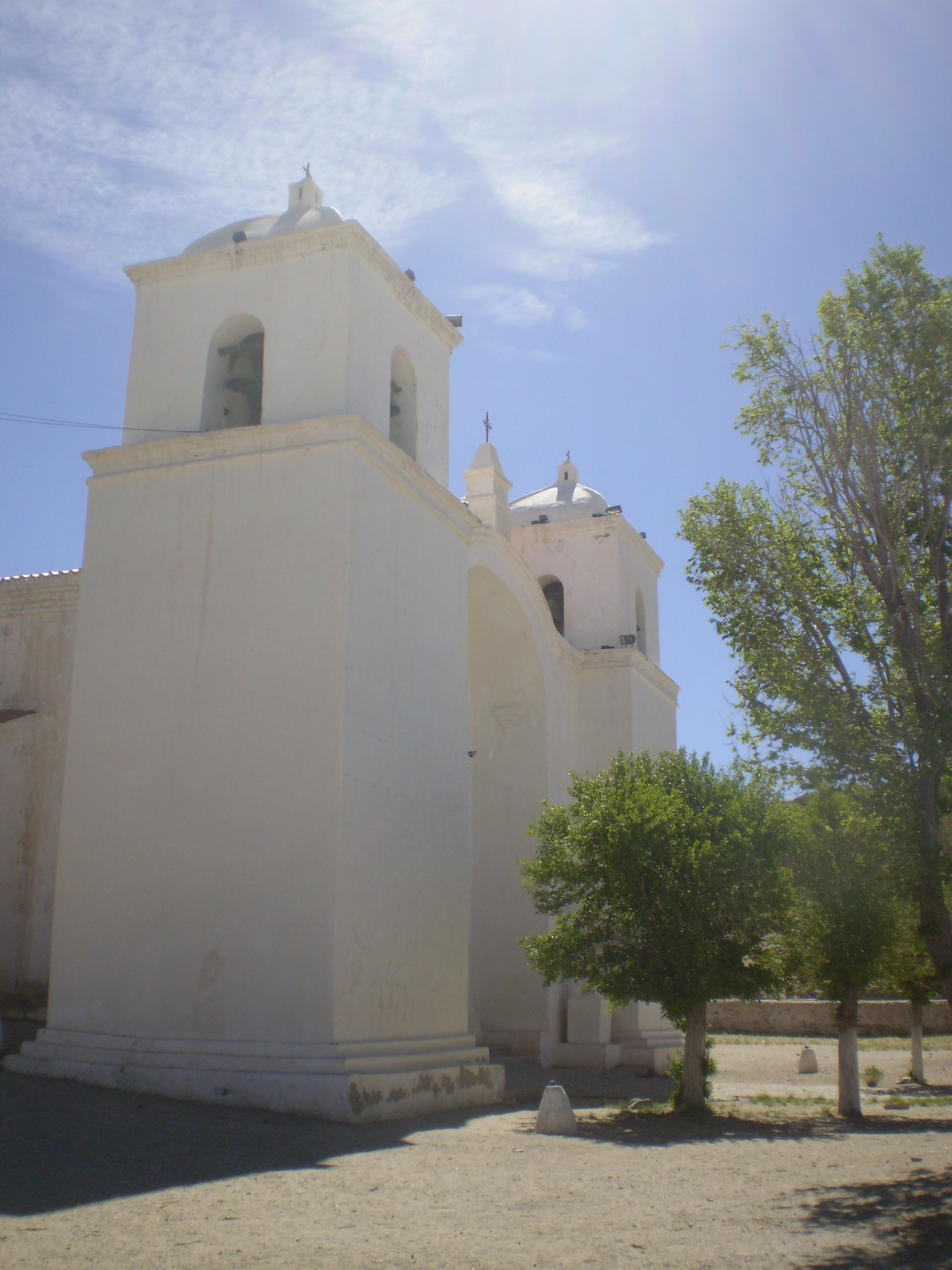
Casabindo Chapel

Casabindo is a rural municipality and village in Jujuy Province in Argentina.
