= Cuyo Province =

Historic province of Argentina

The Province of Cuyo was a historical province of Argentina. Created on 14 November 1813 by a decree issued by the Second Triumvirate, it had its capital in Mendoza, and was composed of the territories of the present-day Argentine provinces of Mendoza, San Juan and San Luis.

For centuries in colonial times, the region was part of the Captaincy General of Chile, which at the time formed part of the Viceroyalty of Peru. In 1778, the territories under the jurisdiction of Santiago de Chile were divided: Cuyo was transferred to the Viceroyalty of the Río de la Plata, the last Viceroyalty of the Spanish Empire, created a short time before (in 1776) with its capital in Buenos Aires, while the territories of the Captaincy General of Chile lying west of the Andes remained part of the Viceroyalty of Peru.

The first and foremost Governor of the Province of Cuyo was José de San Martín, who devoted his Governorship to the creation of the Army of the Andes and preparations for the Crossing of the Andes campaign.
