= Cochinoca =

Coordinates: 22°44′S 65°54′W

- Rural municipality and village
- Interactive map of Cochinoca
- Country: Argentina
- Province: Jujuy Province
- Elevation: 3,552 m (11,654 ft)

Population (2001 INDEC)
  - Total: 79
- Time zone: UTC−3 (ART)
- Zip Code: Y4641

Cochinoca is a rural municipality and village in Jujuy Province in Argentina.

== Climate ==
Climate data for Cochinoca (1987–1990)
Month	Jan	Feb	Mar	Apr	May	Jun	Jul	Aug	Sep	Oct	Nov	Dec	Year
Daily mean °C (°F)	11.2 (52.2)	11.0 (51.8)	10.5 (50.9)	8.3 (46.9)	5.2 (41.4)	3.4 (38.1)	2.8 (37.0)	4.8 (40.6)	6.7 (44.1)	9.0 (48.2)	10.3 (50.5)	10.9 (51.6)	7.8 (46.0)
Average precipitation mm (inches)	90 (3.5)	56 (2.2)	77 (3.0)	22 (0.9)	0 (0)	0 (0)	0 (0)	0 (0)	0 (0)	0 (0)	25 (1.0)	64 (2.5)	334 (13.1)
Source: Instituto Nacional de Tecnología Agropecuaria
