= Tonocoté =

Ethnic group in Argentina

Flag

The Tonocotés or Tonokotés are an Aboriginal people inhabiting the provinces of Santiago del Estero and Tucumán in Argentina.

== History ==
In ancient times inhabited the south-central plains of Santiago del Estero and the current city.

By 1480 the Inca Empire occupied northwestern Argentina, incorporating part of the tonocotés.

The Spaniards called the tonocotés and other peoples of the former Tucumán as Juríes, deformation of the Quechua word xuri that means Rhea, because of the kind of loincloth feathers of this bird that the natives wore and that they moved into real flocks. In 1574 the name of tonocoté appears on a document and eventually supplanted the earlier denomination.

They belong to brasílido type: height and nose are median and have broad face. They received a strong influence of Andean cultures, being sedentary and practicing agriculture, hunting, fishing and gathering.Limited to the north by the lules, south by the sanavirones, west to the diaguitas and east by the Salado River.

== Lifestyle ==
The houses were built on artificial mounds forming elevation, were round and made with slightly durable material and thatch. Enclosed their villages with palisades.

The annual flooding of the Dulce and Salado rivers were used to irrigate their crops of corn, quinoa, beans and squash. Raised llamas and ostriches. They also practiced collecting algarroba, chañar, opuntia and wild honey.

They stand out in pottery making large funeral urns and pucos, with elaborate motifs. They also developed the loom, feather ornaments and basketry.

== Today ==
Current tonocotés are known as suritas. They are partially mestizos descended from the ancient tonocotés and speak their own dialect derived from Santiago del Estero's quichua. They are distributed in 19 rural communities with about 6,000 residents in the departments of San Martín, Figueroa and Avellaneda from Santiago del Estero. (According to the 2010 national census, the tonocotés village had 4,853 inhabitants)

== Communities ==
In the Alberdi Department

- Aboriginal Community Mistolito

In the Avellaneda Department

- Indigenous community tonokoté Mailín Ñaupa (from Villa Maulín)
- Indigenous community tonokoté Breáyoj
- Indigenous community tonokoté Taqo Sombreana (from San Antonio de Copo)
- Paso Grande
- Pozo Mosoj
- San Roque
- Tala Atun

In San Martín Department

- Aboriginal Community Linton
- La Blanca

In the Figueroa Department

- Aboriginal Community Canteros
