= Gran Chaco people =

Ethnic group of South America

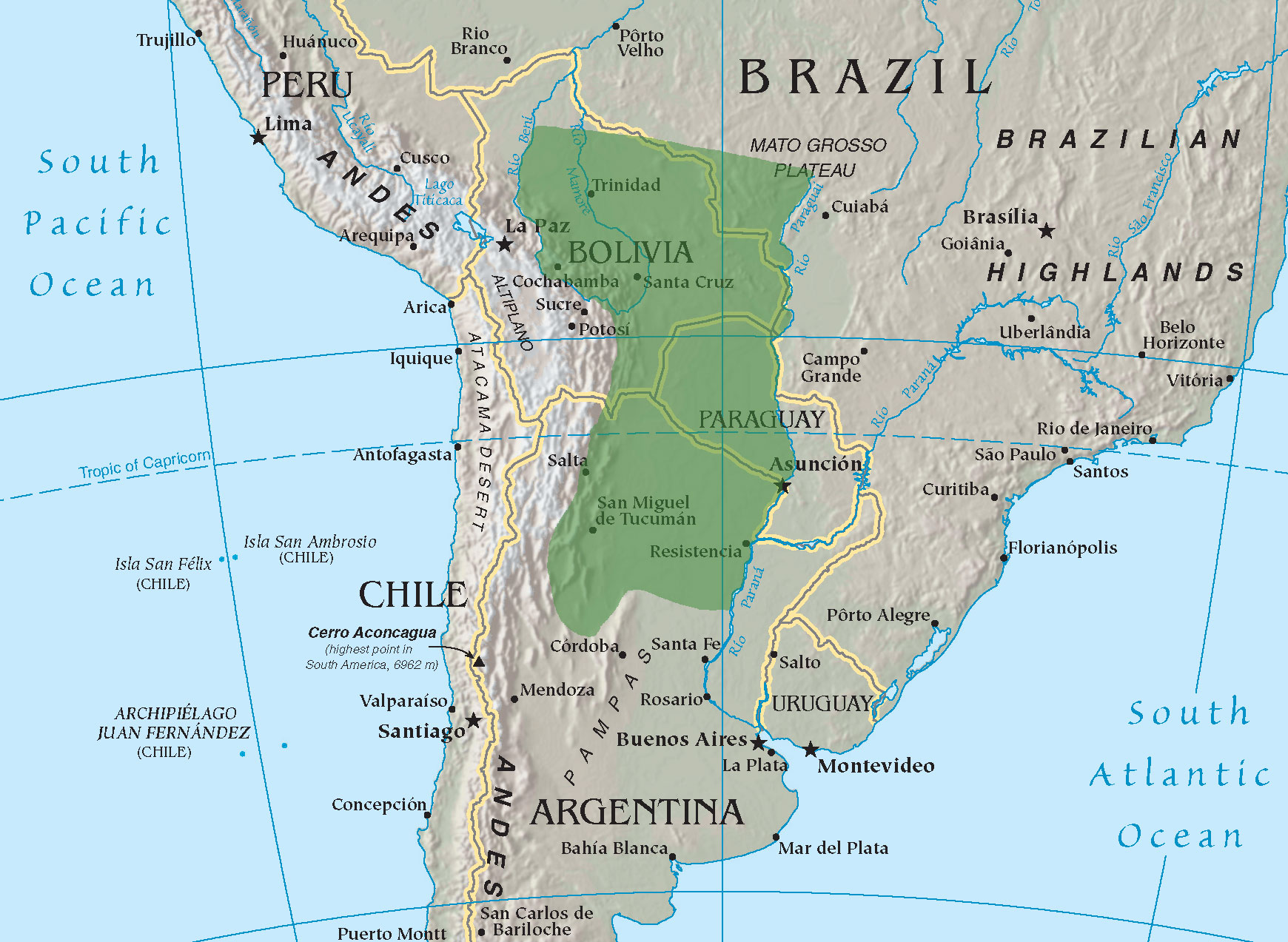
- Area of the Gran Chaco

Total population
- 300,000 (est. 2010)

Regions with significant populations
- Argentina, Brazil, Bolivia, Paraguay

Languages
- See text

Religion
- traditional tribal religion, Catholicism, Protestantism, atheism

The indigenous Gran Chaco people consist of approximately thirty-five tribal groups in the Gran Chaco of South America. Because, like the Great Plains of North America, the terrain lent itself to a nomadic lifestyle, there is little to no archaeological evidence of their prehistoric occupation. Contributing to this near-absence of archaeological data is the lack of suitable raw material for stone tools or permanent construction and soil conditions that are not conducive to the preservation of organic material.

== Geography ==
The actual cultural area of the Gran Chaco peoples differs from that of the geographic Gran Chaco. The northwestern boundary of the cultural area is the Parapetí River and the marshes of the Bañados de Izozog depression, beyond which were the lands of the culturally unrelated Chané and Chiriguano. The cultural boundaries have not been static, even during historical times. In the late 17th century the area expanded to the east across the Paraguay River, when the Mbayá invaded the lands between the Apa River and the Miranda River in Mato Grosso do Sul province in Brazil.

== Languages ==
The tribal groups of the Gran Chaco fall into six language families:

1. Matacoan languages or Mataco-maká (Wichí languages, Chorote languages, Nivaclé languages and the Maká language)
2. Guaicuruan languages
3. Lule–Vilela languages
4. Mascoian languages
5. Zamucoan languages
6. Tupi–Guarani languages

Many of the languages are part of a Chaco linguistic area. Common Chaco areal features include SVO word order and active-stative verb alignment. (See also Mataco–Guaicuru languages.)

== History ==
The modern history of the Gran Chaco peoples is one of marginalization and outright genocide.

== See also ==
- Campo del Cielo
- Classification of indigenous peoples of the Americas#Gran Chaco
- Gran Chaco#Indigenous peoples of the Gran Chaco

== Bibliography ==
- Combes, Isabelle; Villar, Diego; Lowrey, Kathleen (2009). "Comparative Studies and the South American Gran Chaco". Tipití: Journal of the Society for the Anthropology of Lowland South America. 7 (1): 69–102. Archived from the original on 1 February 2014.
- Métraux, Alfred (1946). Steward, Julian H. (ed.). "Part 2: Indians of the Grand Chaco – Ethnography of the Chaco". Bureau of American Ethnology, Bulletin. 1 (143). Washington, D.C.: Smithsonian Institution: 197–370.
- Stunnenberg, Petrus Walterus (1993). Entitled to Land: The Incorporation of the Paraguayan and Argentinean Gran Chaco and the Spatial Marginalization of the Indian People (PDF). Nijmegen Studies in Development and Cultural Change. Fort Lauderdale, Florida: Verlag Breitenbach. Archived (PDF) from the original on 18 February 2019.
