= Chorote =

Indigenous people of Argentina and Paraguay

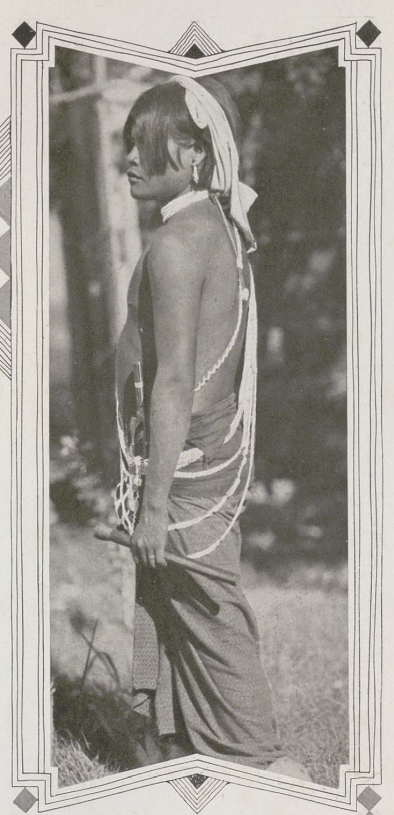
- A Chorote person in 1930

Total population
- c. 3,700

Regions with significant populations
- Argentina: 3,238 (2022)
- Paraguay: 431 (2022)

Languages
- Chorote languages and Spanish

The Chorote are an Indigenous people of the Gran Chaco. Most live in northeastern Salta Province in Argentina and western Paraguay, particularly in the region of the Pilcomayo River; their historical range also extended into southeastern Bolivia. The name encompasses the closely related Iyojwaʼajaʼ, Iyoʼawujwaʼ and Manjui populations. Their speech varieties constitute the Chorote branch of the Mataguayan language family.

== Names and divisions ==
Chorote, also written Chorotí, is an exonym probably derived from Chiriguano Guaraní. Older literature contains several other spellings, including Soloti, Tsoloti and Yofuaha.

Contemporary linguistic literature distinguishes the Iyojwaʼajaʼ, or Riverine Chorote, from the Forest Chorote grouping. The latter comprises the Iyoʼawujwaʼ of Argentina and the closely related Manjui of Paraguay. In Argentina the riverine and forest groups now share the same territory.

The use of Manjui varies by context. In everyday Paraguayan usage it may refer to any Chorote person, regardless of dialect, while linguists generally reserve it for particular Paraguayan varieties. The term was originally a Nivaclé exonym; Manjui speakers also use the self-designation Inkijwas, meaning “neighbours” or “those who live together”.

== History ==
An anthropological reconstruction places the Chorote on the right bank of the middle Bermejo River until the second half of the seventeenth century. Colonial punitive expeditions contributed to their movement north towards the Pilcomayo, where communities later occupied both sides of the river and parts of the central-western Paraguayan Chaco.

Late nineteenth- and early twentieth-century records describe Chorote settlements, trade and shifting relations with neighbouring Nivaclé, Wichí, Tapieté, Toba and Chiriguano groups. These sources must be read cautiously because explorers often applied ethnic labels inconsistently. Trade networks crossed political and ethnic boundaries: Chorote communities exchanged fish, iron, shell ornaments, textiles and pigments with neighbouring peoples.

The Chaco War between Bolivia and Paraguay from 1932 to 1935 caused repeated displacement. After the war, many Chorote settled in evangelical missions in Argentina and in Mennonite settlements or Catholic missions in Paraguay. Seasonal wage labour in the sugar mills of northwestern Argentina had already drawn Chorote workers into the regional market economy during the early twentieth century. As mechanisation reduced this work from the 1960s, commercial fishing, agricultural labour and the sale of handicrafts became alternative sources of income.

== Subsistence and material culture ==
Chorote subsistence traditionally combined hunting, gathering, fishing and small-scale horticulture. Rainy-season villages were comparatively settled, while families used temporary camps and moved more widely during much of the dry season. Wild fruits and honey were important foods, and cultivated plants included maize, cassava and several kinds of squash.

An ethnobotanical study published in 2007 recorded 57 wild edible plant species and 118 methods of preparing or consuming them. Most of these foods were then used only occasionally or were remembered rather than regularly eaten, although the researchers found that Chorote knowledge included a particularly wide range of edible plants compared with neighbouring peoples.

Fishing remains closely tied to settlement along the Pilcomayo. Field research in Salta documented nine fishing techniques and 49 plant species used in making nets, weapons, traps, bait, carrying equipment and utensils for cooking or storage. Some older techniques had fallen out of use, but fishing retained both economic and cultural importance. Traditional crafts include pottery, woodworking, net-making and weaving.

== Social and religious life ==
Traditional Chorote society was organised into bilateral, exogamous bands composed of extended families. Age grades structured responsibilities and status, with elders serving as important teachers and guides. Political authority was decentralised: local leaders and temporary leaders operating across several bands depended more on consensus, generosity and persuasive ability than coercion.

Traditional religious narratives centre on cycles of disorder and renewal and include beings with both creator and trickster characteristics. Shamans and elders formerly held distinct healing and divinatory roles. The spring carob festival, associated with the ripening of wild fruits, promoted renewal and relations between groups. Anglican and Pentecostal evangelisation from the 1940s produced new combinations of Christian and Indigenous beliefs, while some shamanic practices continued or were later revived.

== Language and population ==
Chorote is variously analysed as one language with markedly differentiated varieties or as two closely related languages. Iyoʼawujwaʼ and Manjui are substantially closer to one another than either is to Iyojwaʼajaʼ. The varieties are generally mutually intelligible to a considerable degree, although comprehension can be asymmetrical between speakers in Argentina and Paraguay.

Multilingualism is common in some mixed communities. Research at Misión La Paz documented the use of Chorote, Nivaclé and Wichí within the same families. Speakers often used their own language while understanding a different language spoken in reply; spouses and siblings could therefore identify with and regularly use different languages.

Argentina's 2022 census recorded 3,238 people identifying as Chorote; 75.1 per cent reported that they spoke or understood a Chorote language. The principal communities in the Chaco region include Misión La Paz, La Bolsa, La Gracia, La Merced Vieja and La Merced Nueva, while other communities are located around Tartagal and General Mosconi. Paraguay's 2022 Indigenous census counted 431 Manjui. Their principal population centres include Santa Rosa (Wonta), Abizai and San Eugenio–San Agustín in Boquerón Department.

== See also ==
- Indigenous peoples in Argentina
- Indigenous peoples in Paraguay
