= Chaco linguistic area =

Linguistic area of South America

The Chaco linguistic area is a linguistic area that includes various South American language families and isolates of the Chaco region of South America, in southern Brazil, southeastern Bolivia, Paraguay, Uruguay, and Argentina.

Common Chaco areal features include SVO word order and active-stative verb alignment.

== Languages ==
Campbell and Grondona (2012) list the following languages as part of the Chaco linguistic area.

- Mataco–Guaicuru
  - Matacoan
  - Guaicuruan
- Mascoyan
- Zamucoan
- Lule–Vilelan
- some southern Tupi-Guarani languages (Guarani dialects)

Charruan is sometimes also included. Jorge Suárez includes Charruan with Guaicuruan in a hypothetical Waikuru-Charrúa stock. Morris Swadesh includes Charruan along with Guaicuruan, Matacoan, and Mascoyan within his Macro-Mapuche stock. Both proposals appear to be obsolete.

Jolkesky (2016) suggests that Trumai has lexical similarities with the Macro-Mataguayo-Guaykuru and Tupian language families. These apparent similarities with the Macro-Mataguayo-Guaykuru languages and Tupi-Guarani languages suggest that Trumai had originated in the Paraguay River basin. The Trumai had only arrived in the Upper Xingu basin via the Culuene River during the 19th century (Villas Bôas & Villas Bôas 1970:27).

The following language families of the Argentinian Pampas are also included in some classifications.

- Huarpean (Allentiac–Millcayac)
- Chonan

== Linguistic features ==
Linguistic features that are characteristic of the Chaco linguistic area include:

- gender that not overtly marked on nouns, but is present in demonstratives, depending on the gender of the nouns modified
- genitive classifiers for possessed domestic animals
- SVO word order
- active-stative verb alignment
- large set of directional verbal affixes
- demonstrative system with rich contrasts including visible vs. not visible
- some adjectives as polar negatives
- resistance to borrowing foreign words

== Macro-Chaco hypothesis ==
Nikulin (2019) suggests a Macro-Chaco hypothesis linking Jê-Tupí-Cariban (including Karirian and Bororoan) with Mataco-Guaicuruan (possibly including Zamucoan):

- Macro-Chaco
  - Macro-Guaicurú
    - Matacoan
    - Guaicurú
    - (?) Zamuco
  - Jê-Tupí-Cariban
    - Macro-Tupian
      - Tupian
      - Macro-Jê + Chiquitano
    - Macro-Cariban
      - Cariban
      - Karirí
      - Boróro

== See also ==
- Linguistic areas of the Americas
- Mamoré–Guaporé linguistic area
- Macro-Warpean languages
- Moseten–Chonan languages
- Indigenous languages of South America
