= Mbya =

Mbya may refer to:

- Mbayá, a historic ethnic group of Paraguay, Bolivia and Brazil
- Mbyá Guaraní people, an ethnic group of Paraguay, Brazil, Argentina, and Uruguay
- Mbyá Guaraní language, a Guarani language of Argentina, Brazil, and Paraguay
- Sirionó language, a Guarayu language of Bolivia

== See also ==
- Kadiweu language or Mbayá, a Guaicuruan language of Brazil
- Mbia (disambiguation)
