= Guaycura =

Guaycura, Guaycuri, Waicura, or other variants may refer to:

- Guaycura people, a former ethnic group of Mexico
- Guaycura language, an extinct language of Mexico

== See also ==
- Guaycuru peoples, a group of people of South America
- Guaicuruan languages, or Waikurúan, a language family of South America
