= Guachi language =

Extinct language of Argentina

Guachí
- Wachí
- Native to: Brazil
- Region: Mato Grosso do Sul
- Ethnicity: Guachí
- Era: attested 1845
- Language family: Language isolate (Guaicuruan?)

Language codes
- ISO 639-3: None (mis)
- Glottolog: guac1239

Guachí (Wachí) is an extinct language isolate, possibly related to Guaicuruan, of Brazil. It is usually classified as one of the Guaicuruan languages, but the data is insufficient to demonstrate that. The people it was spoken by were Guaicuruanized.

== Documentation ==
Guachi is known only from 145 words collected by Francis de Castelnau from March to early April 1845 in the Miranda area of Argentina.

== Classification ==
Viegas Barros (2004) proposes that Guachi, as well as Payaguá, may be a Macro-Guaicurúan language. However, Campbell (2012) classifies Guachi as a language isolate.

== Vocabulary ==
Guachi words and affixes listed in Viegas Barros (2004):

no.	Spanish gloss (original)	English gloss (translated)	Guachi
1	agua	water	euak
2	lago	lake	tawicha
3	estrella	star	aati
4	posiblemente día	day ?	aanau-, naau-
5	diente	tooth	iava
6	labios	lips	iapé
7	ojo	eye	iataya
8	ceja	eyebrow	iticha
9	cabeza	head	iotapa
10	hombro	shoulder	-eu (< iolai-eu)
11	cabello	hair	ioatriz
12	mentón	chin	irak
13	comer	eat	iik
14	dormir	sleep	amma
15	golpear, batir	hit, beat	sapak
16	sentarse	sit down	ineche
17	posiblemente indígena	indigenous ?	-euleuc
18	hijo	son	inna
19	dos	two	eu-echo
20	no	no	an
21	gallina	hen	wokaake
22	pipa	pipe	ouchete
23	posiblemente otra vez	again ?	-way
24	posiblemente negación léxica	negation ?	ag-
25	posiblemente posesivo de 1ª. p. sing.	1.SG possessive ?	i-
26	posiblemente plural nominal	nominal plural ?	-i
27	posiblemente femenino	feminine ?	-jen
28	lluvia	rain	fou-é
29	calor	hot	o-outé
30	pierna	leg	iacté
31	matar	kill	outei
32	hambre	hungry	yawookta
33	anciano	old man	seera
34	demasiado	excessively	euaité
35	pez	fish	aney
36	lagartija	lizard	kaliske
37	papagayo	parrot	calicheechee
38	tucán	toucan	iacat
39	armadillo	armadillo	tatae sia
40	sable	saber	nasakanate
41	luna	moon	o-alete
42	tierra	earth	leek
43	nariz	nose	ia-note
44	pierna	leg	iacalep
45	muslo	thigh	iakamnan
46	posiblemente uno	one ?	-kailau
47	tres	three	eu-echo-kailau
48	hablar	talk	ieuech
49	cansarse	become tired	ya-weul
50	cocinar	cook	ayai
51	sufijo derivativo de significado posible ‘parecido a’	suffix < ‘alike’ ?	-tok
52	caballo	horse	ometok
53	papagayo (Arara)	parrot (Arara)	caga
54	casa	house	poecha
55	canoa	canoe	nook
56	fusil	rifle	ta-ai
57	maza, porra	club, bludgeon	palley
58	piedra	stone	sitrat
59	frío	cold	catate
60	garganta	throat	iracheu
61	vientre	belly	iet
62	leche	milk	lachouway
63	mano	hand	-mason (< iolaimason)
64	morder	bite	apa-eu

=== Castelnau (1850) ===
The following vocabulary is taken from Castelnau's wordlist published in 1850.

French gloss (original)	English gloss (translated)	Guachí
Dieu	God	yathlein
Diable	devil	oetcho
Homme	man	chacup
Femme	woman	outié
Fils	son	inna
Fille	daughter	unajen
Tête	head	iotapa
Cheveux	hair	ioatriz
Front	forehead	iatapole
Œil	eye	iataya
Cils	eyelash	iticha
Nez	nose	ianoté
Un	one	tamak
Deux	two	eu-echo
Trois	three	eu-echo-kailau
Quatre	four	eu-echo-way
Cinq	five	localau
