= Guaycuru peoples =

Family of ethnic groups of the Gran Chaco, central South America

Guaycuru
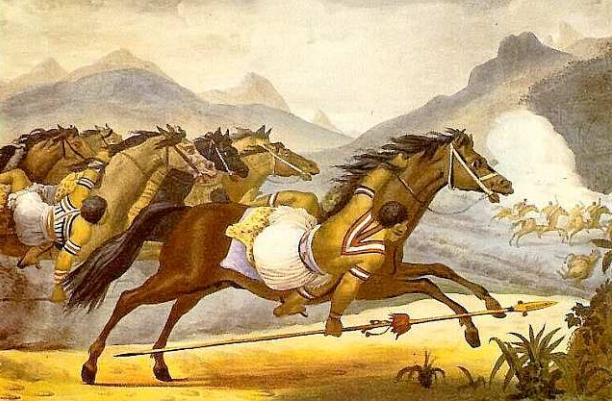
- Jean-Baptiste Debret's depiction of the Guaycuru cavalry during an attack

Regions with significant populations
- Brazil, Paraguay, Argentina, Uruguay

Languages
- Guaicuruan languages

Religion
- Animism

Related ethnic groups
- Guarani

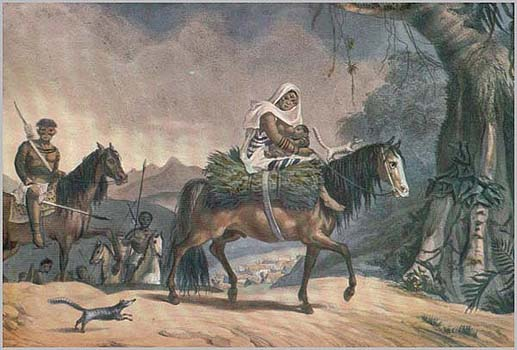
Guaycuru nomads by Debret

Guaycuru or Guaykuru is a generic term for several ethnic groups Indigenous to the Gran Chaco region of South America, who speak related Guaicuruan languages. At the time of first contact with Spanish explorers and colonists in the 16th century, the Guaycuru people lived in the present-day countries of Argentina (north of Santa Fe Province), Paraguay, Bolivia, and Brazil (south of Corumbá).

The name is written guaycurú or guaicurú in Spanish (plural guaycurúes or guaicurúes), and guaicuru in Portuguese (plural guaicurus). It was originally an offensive epithet given to the Mbayá people of Paraguay by the Guaraní, meaning "savage" or "barbarian", which was later extended to the whole group. It has also been used in the past to include other peoples of the Chaco region, but its usage is now restricted to those speaking a Guaicuruan language.

First encountered by the Spanish in the 16th century, the Guaycuru peoples strongly resisted Spanish control and the efforts of Catholic missionaries to Christianise them. Guaycuru groups maintained varying degrees of political and military independence into the late 19th and early 20th centuries, when their territories were brought under the effective control of the surrounding states.

== Divisions ==
The 16th century Guaycuru appear to have been a southern band of the Mbayá rather than a separate people. The terms Mbaya and Guaycuru were synonymous to the early Spanish colonists. Guaycuru came to be the collective name applied to all the bands speaking similar languages, called Guaycuruan.

The major extant branches of the Guaycuru are:

- Mocoví (Mocobi)
- Toba
- Pilagá
- Kadiwéu

Other Guaycuru groups have become extinguished over the last 500 years:

- Abipón
- Mbayá (ancestral to the Kadiweu)
- Payaguá, also known as Evueví or Evebe.

The Mocoví, Toba, and Pilagá call themselves qom and appear to form a linguistic and ethnic continuum. They have been placed together with the Abipón in the "Southern" division, while the Kadiweu are placed by themselves in a "Northern" division. The placement of the Payaguá in this classification is still controversial.

Some authors, such as Quevedo, Hunt, Mason, Greenberg and Viegas Barros, have joined the Guaycuru and the Mataguay languages into a larger Mataco–Guaycuru language family, but it is not clear yet whether the similarities between the vocabularies of the two families are due to a common origin or to borrowing.

== Culture ==
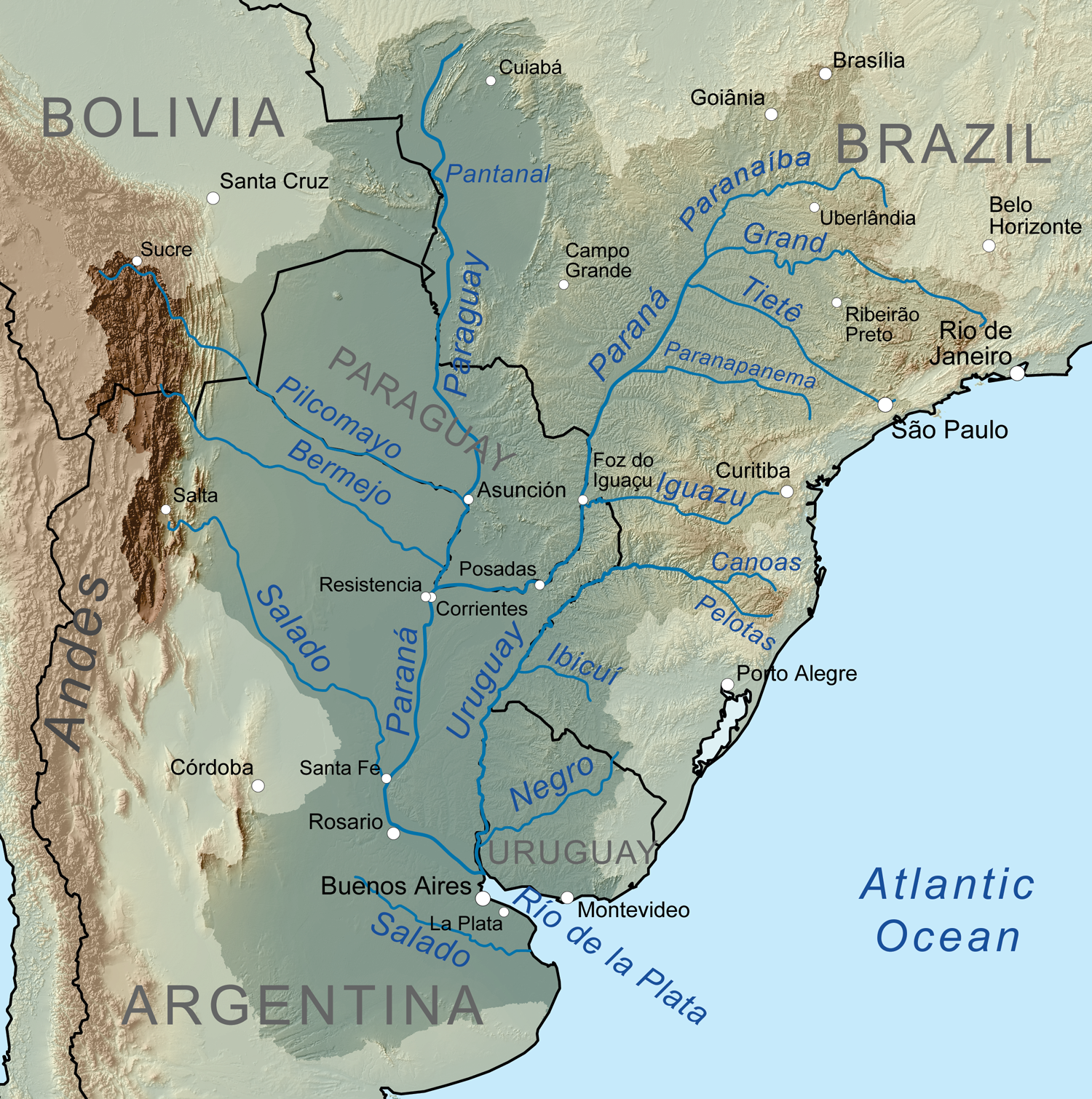
The Guaycuru peoples lived mostly west of the Parana and Paraguay Rivers from Santa Fe in Argentina northward to Brazil and Bolivia.

The Guaycuru people consisted of many bands making up distinct ethnic groups with different but similar languages. The Guaycuruans were never politically united and were often hostile to each other as well as to other peoples.

When first encountered in the 16th century, the Guaycuru lived in the Gran Chaco, an inhospitable region for agriculture and settlement in the eyes of the Spanish colonists. They were hunter-gatherers and nomadic, moving from place to place as dictated by seasonal resources. The governor of Paraguay, Alvar Núñez Cabeza de Vaca, said in the 1540s of the Guaycuru:

"These Indians are great warriors and valiant men, who live on venison, butter, honey, fish, and wild boar...They go daily to the chase for it is their only occupation. They are nimble and quick, so long-winded that they tire out the deer and catch them with their hands...They are kind to their wives...They are much feared by all the other tribes. They never remain more than two days in one place, but quickly remove their houses, made of matting..."

The Abipón Guaycuruans acquired horses from the Spanish in the late 16th century and within 50 years developed a horse culture similar to that of the Plains Indians of North America. They and other Guaycuruans acquired horses and cattle by raiding Spanish haciendas and Guaraní settlements and Jesuit missions east of the Paraguay and Parana rivers. Between raids they traded skins, wax, honey, salt, and Guaraní slaves to the Spanish en exchange for knives, hatchets, and other products. The mobility afforded by the horse facilitated Guaycuruan control over other peoples in the Chaco and made raiding the Spaniards and their Indian allies a profitable enterprise.

The Payaguá, inhabiting the shores of the Paraguay River north of the city of Asunción, were an exception to the horse culture of other Guaycuruans. The Payagua plied the river in canoes, fished and gathered edible plants, and raided their agricultural neighbors, the Guaraní, to the east. The Payaguá also became great traders, both with the Spanish and other Guaycuruans. The Payaguá menaced Spanish travel on the Paraguay river for 200 years.

The bands and family groups making up the Guaycuruans were matrilocal and exogamous. The bands only united on ceremonial occasions, especially during the harvest period for wild honey and algarroba (Prosopis) pods which were used to produce a fermented alcoholic beverage. The reunions were used to designate leaders, reinforce relations among the bands, and facilitate courtships and marriages.

The Guaycuruan population of the Chaco in pre-Hispanic times has been estimated to be as high as 500,000. Although documentation is mostly lacking, the Guaycuruans were impacted by epidemics of European diseases; this impact, however, was possibly less severe than that suffered by their settled, agricultural neighbours such as the Guaraní. The Guaycuruan population in the mid-17th century is estimated at 40,000.

== History ==
In 1542, Cabeza de Vaca responded to the request of the Guaraní to punish the hostile Guaycuru. He dispatched a large expedition of Spaniard and Guaraní soldiers from Asunción and attacked an encampment of Mbayas, also called Eyiguayegis. The Spanish and Guaraní killed many and took 400 prisoners. In the aftermath of the battle, however, the Guaycuruans retained their control of the Chaco and gradually acquired horses, a taste for Spanish beef, and iron weapons and tools. In the 17th century, Guaycuruan raids forced the abandonment of Concepción del Bermejo, Argentina and the relocation of Santa Fe, Argentina. In retaliation, in 1677, the Spanish massacred 300 Mbayan traders who were camped near Asunción. By the early 1700s, bands of up to 400 Guaycuruan warriors were attacking Spanish settlements in Tucuman and other nearby Argentine provinces. Their raids forced the Spanish to abandon some frontier areas. Frequent Spanish military expeditions against the Guaycuruans were only temporarily successful if at all.

The Guaycuruans largest raid came in 1735 when 1,000 Mocobis and Tobas descended upon Salta Province, Argentina. They killed or captured hundreds of people, ransoming some captives and keeping others as slaves, and much livestock. Mbaya raids in Paraguay during the same decade resulted in the death of 500 Paraguayans and the theft of 6,000 head of livestock. However, Guaycuruan power had reached its zenith. A smallpox epidemic from 1732 to 1736 killed many, especially Mocobis; Spanish settlements were encroaching on the Chaco, and some of the Guaycuruans were adopting Spanish culture and religion. Moreover, the human pressure on the Chaco led to its environmental deterioration and it became less suitable as a habitat for the traditional hunting-gathering culture plus horse and cattle herds of the Chaco peoples.

Jesuit missionaries made unsuccessful attempts to establish missions or reductions among the Guaycuruans in the early 1600s. Their first successful mission was established among the Mocobis at San Javier, north of Santa Fe, Argentina in 1743. Several other missions were established among the various ethnic groups of the Guaycuru and the mission population reached a peak of 5,000 to 6,000 in the early 1780s. The population of the missions was unstable as many Guaycuruans returned to their nomadic ways after a residence at a mission. Many Guaycuruans were also, by this time, integrated into the Spanish economy, raising livestock, growing crops, and working for wages—although many also continued smuggling and stealing livestock and remained hostile to the Spanish.

== Decline ==
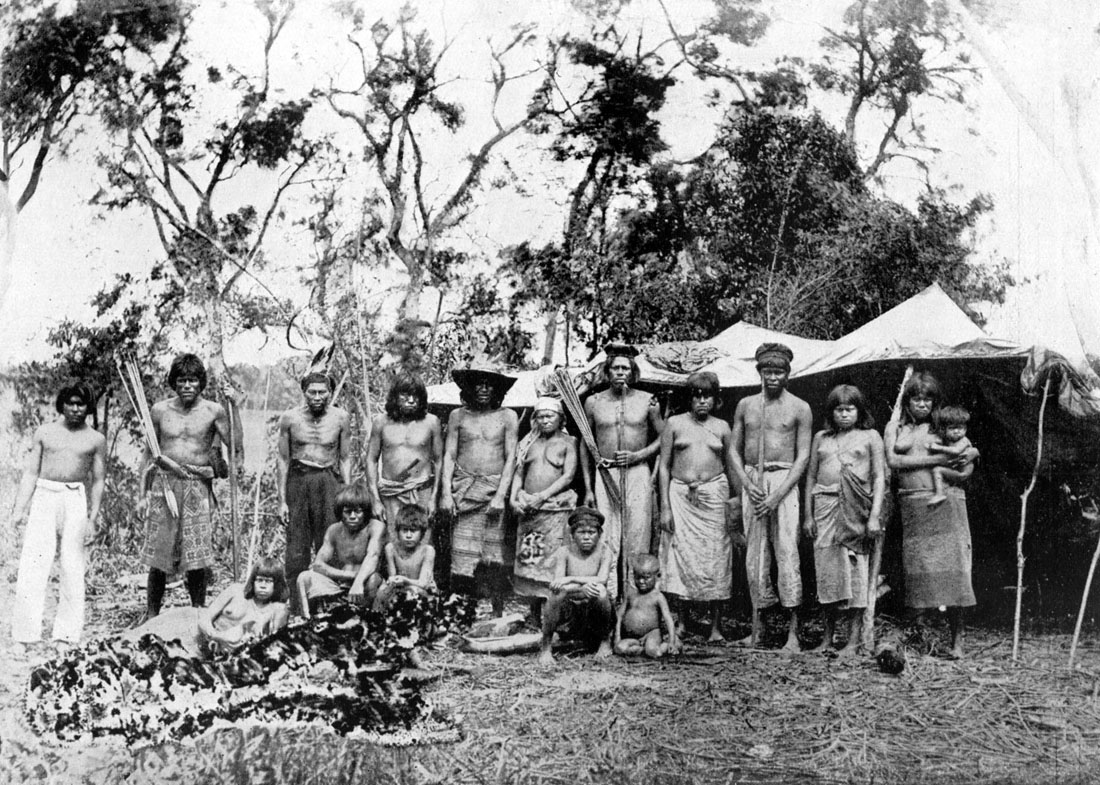
Tobas in Formosa Province, Argentina, 1892.

By the early 19th century, when the South American countries sought independence from Spain, the Guaycuruan peoples were divided among those who lived in missions and were at least partially integrated into Hispanic and Christian society and those who continued to live as nomads in the more isolated parts of the Gran Chaco. In the independence movement of the early 19th century, some Guaycuruans served with the colonial independence armies, whilst others resumed their raiding ways and expelled settlers from part of the Argentine Chaco. However, old animosities among the various ethnic groups making up the Guaycuruans led to internecine warfare among Tobas, Macobis, and Albipones. The Mbayas were increasingly absorbed into Brazilian society.

Only a "small, depressed colony" of the once powerful Payaguá still survived near Asunción in 1852. The last known Payaguá, Maria Dominga Miranda, died in the early 1940s. The Abipón became extinct in the last half of the 19th century. The Mbayas were given land by Brazil for their assistance in the Paraguayan War (1864-1870), but survive only as the Kadiweu, numbering 1,400 in 2014.

The still-nomadic Tobas and Mocovis in the Argentine Chaco continued to resist the advancing frontier until 1884, when they were decisively defeated by the army; while a number of them agreed to thereafter live in reductions, thousands of Tobas retreated to isolated regions of Argentina, Paraguay and Bolivia and retained some level of autonomy into the 20th century. In 1904, a millenarian movement, similar to that of the Ghost Dance in the North American West, erupted among the Mocovis of San Javier, Santa Fe, Argentina, but was quickly squelched when 500 of them were repulsed after an attack on the town. In 1924, Argentine police and military killed 400 Toba in what became known as the Napalpí massacre.

In the 1968 census, 16,548 Tobas and 1,202 of the closely-related Pilagás were counted in Argentina. 2,600 Tobas were living in Bolivia. 3,000 to 6,000 Mocovis lived in Argentina in 1968.
