= Mbia =

Mbia may refer to:

- Mbya, or Mbiá, the name of several ethnic groups and languages of South America
- MBIA, a financial services company
- Mbia (surname)
