= Kadiwéu =

Indigenous people of Brazil

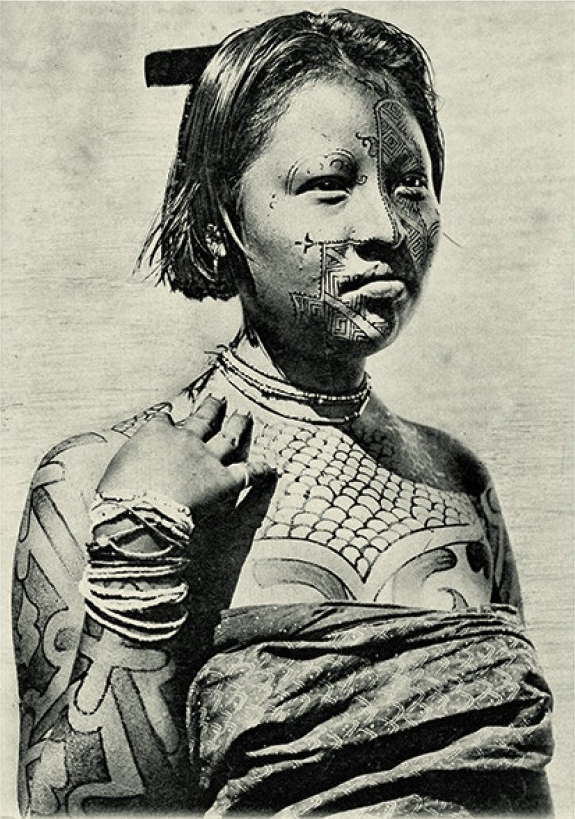
- Kadiwéu woman from Nabileque River region, Brazil, ca. 1892

Total population
- 1346 (2009)–1400

Regions with significant populations
- Brazil (Mato Grosso do Sul)

Languages
- Kadiweu

Religion
- traditional tribal religion

The Kadiwéu are an Indigenous people of Brazil. In 1998, they lived in four villages, with some families living independently in the jungle. They are known for their horse riding skills.

== Name ==
Their name is now spelled "Kadiwéu" in Portuguese (plural Kadiwéus). The Kadiweu are also known as the Cadiguebo, Cadioeo, Caduveo, Caduvéo, Caduví, Cayua, Guaicuru, Kadiveo, Kadivéu, Kadiweu, Kaduveo, Kaiwa, or Mbayá-Guaikurú.

== Language ==
They are a branch of the Guaycuru peoples and speak the characteristic Kadiweu language that belongs to the Guaicuruan language family. They are the last surviving group of Mbayá peoples.

== Territory ==
The Kadiweu today live in the Kadiweu Indigenous Land, a large reserve established in 1903, in the Brazilian state of Mato Grosso do Sul in the municipality of Porto Murtinho, between the Serra de Bodoquena and the Nabileque and Aquidavão rivers.

== History ==
The Kadiweu are the largest surviving branch of the Mbayá people. The Mbayá were raiders in the 18th century and numbered 4,000, but smallpox and influenza radically decreased their population at the end of the 18th century.

During the War of Triple Alliance of 1865–1870, the Kadiweu fought against Paraguay on the side of Brazil.
