= Vachellia aroma var. huarango =

Scientific classification
- Kingdom: Plantae
- Clade: Tracheophytes
- Clade: Angiosperms
- Clade: Eudicots
- Clade: Rosids
- Order: Fabales
- Family: Fabaceae
- Subfamily: Caesalpinioideae
- Clade: Mimosoid clade
- Genus: Vachellia
- Species: V. aroma
- Variety: V. a. var. huarango

Trinomial name
- Vachellia aroma var. huarango (Ruíz & J. Macbr.) Seigler & Ebinger

Variety of legume

Vachellia aroma var. huarango is low shrub or small tree which grows less than 1.5 m tall, but up to 5 m across. It is found in Ecuador and Peru. This species should not be confused with the Huarango tree Prosopis pallida which is also native to Peru.
