= Mataco–Guaicuru languages =

Proposed language family

Mataguayo–Guaicuru
- Macro-Waikurúan
- (proposed)
- Geographic distribution: South America
- Linguistic classification: Proposed language family
- Subdivisions: Matacoan; Guaicuruan; Guachi †; Payaguá †

Language codes
- Glottolog: None
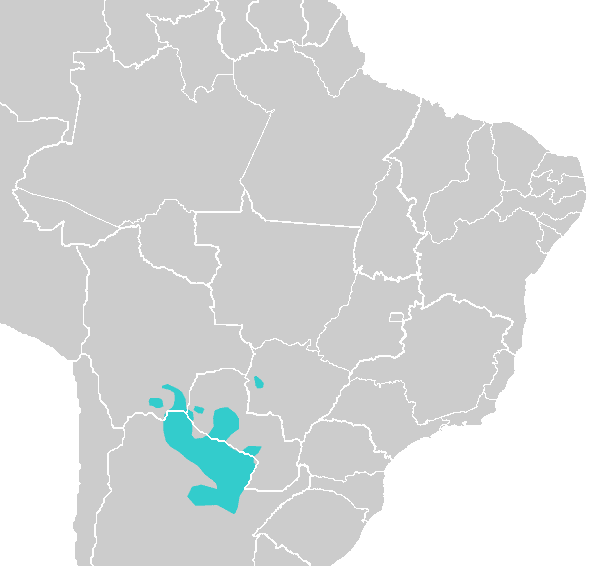

Mataguayo–Guaicuru, Mataco–Guaicuru or Macro-Waikurúan is a proposed language family consisting of the Mataguayan and Guaicuruan languages, as well as the language isolates Guachi and Payagua. Pedro Viegas Barros claims to have demonstrated it. These languages are spoken in Argentina, Brazil, Paraguay, and Bolivia.

== Genetic relations ==
Jorge Suárez linked Guaicuruan and Charruan in a Waikuru-Charrúa stock. Kaufman (2007: 72) has also added Lule–Vilela and Zamucoan, while Morris Swadesh proposed a Macro-Mapuche stock that included Matacoan, Guaicuruan, Charruan, and Mascoyan. Campbell (1997) has argued that those hypotheses should be further investigated, though he no longer intends to evaluate it.

== Language contact ==
Jolkesky (2016) notes that there are lexical similarities with the Arawakan, Tupian, Trumai, and Ofayé language families due to contact, pointing to an origin of Proto-Mataguayo-Guaicuruan in the Upper Paraguay River basin.

== Classification ==
Internal classification by Jolkesky (2016):

(† = extinct)

- Macro-Mataguayo-Guaykuru
  - Payagua †
  - Guachi †
  - Guaykuru
    - Kadiweu
    - Qom-Abipon
      - Abipon †
      - Qom
        - Qom, Southern: Mokovi
        - Qom, Northern: Pilaga; Toba
  - Mataguayo
    - Mataguayo, Western
      - Chorote: Chorote Iyojwa'ja; Chorote Iyo'wujwa
      - Wichi: Wichi Guisnay; Wichi Nokten; Wichi Vejoz
    - Mataguayo, Eastern
      - Maka
      - Nivakle

== Chaco linguistic area ==
Campbell and Grondona (2012) consider the languages to be part of a Chaco linguistic area. Common Chaco areal features include SVO word order and active-stative verb alignment.

== See also ==
- Gran Chaco people
