= Nivaclé =

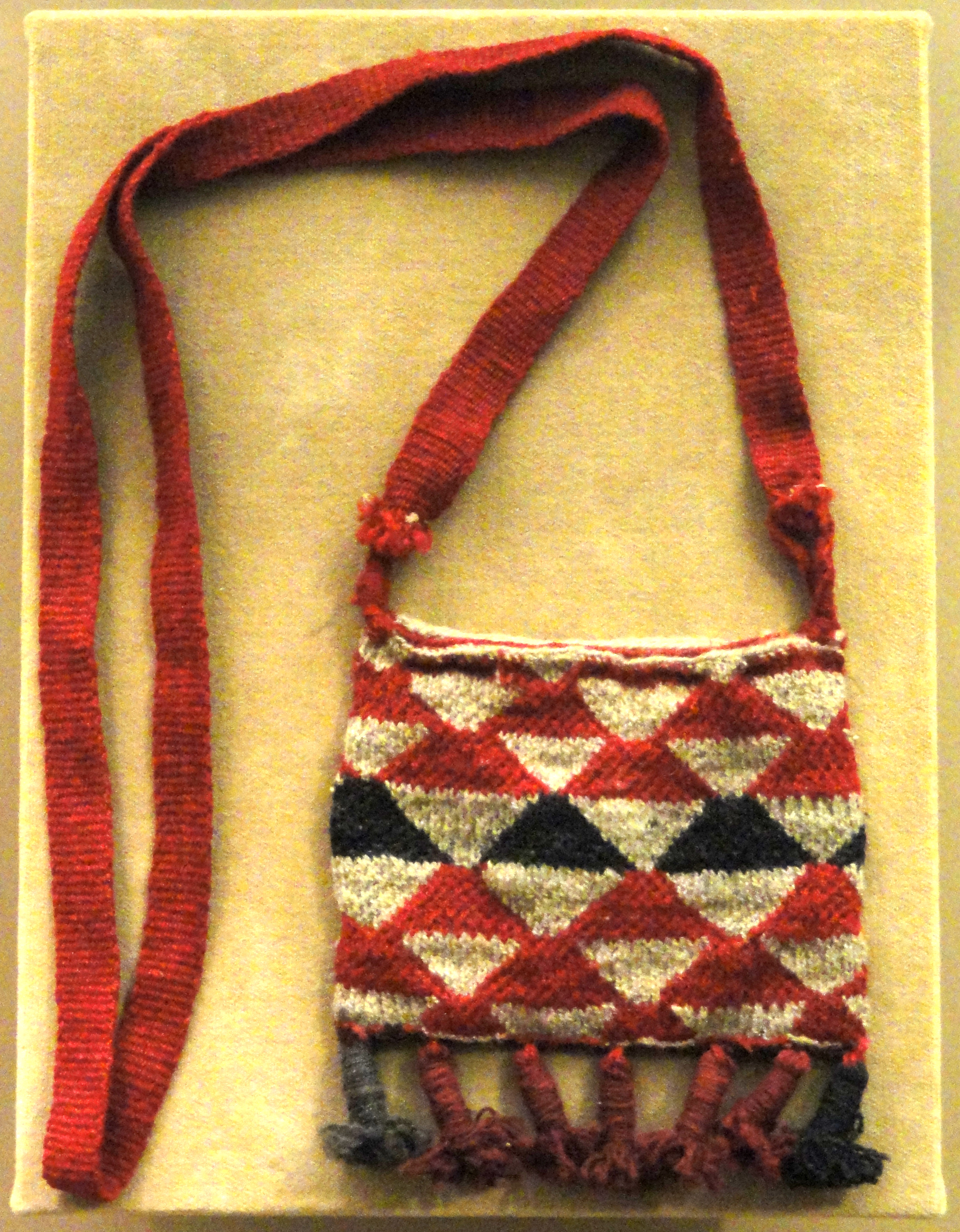
- Nivaclé woven pouch, AMNH

Total population
- 15,000–25,000 (2007)

Regions with significant populations
- Paraguay: 13,700 (1991)
- Argentina: 878 (2022)
- Bolivia: 100

Languages
- Nivaclé, Spanish

Religion
- Animism, Christianity

The Nivaclé are an Indigenous people of the Gran Chaco. An estimated 13,700 Nivaclé people live in the President Hayes and Boquerón Departments in Paraguay, while approximately 200 Nivaclé people live in the Salta Province of Argentina. A very small number of Nivaclé live in Tarija, Bolivia.

Nivaclé people dancing 1908.

In the last 50 years, 15,000 Mennonites from Canada, Russia, and Germany have settled in traditional Nivaclé territory.

== Groups ==
They have five subgroups, which are as follows:

- Tovoc Lhavos, river people: Chishamnee Lhavos, people from above
- Tovoc Lhavos, river people: Shichaam Lhavos, people from below
- Yita' Lhavos, forest people; this group is also known as C’utjaan Lhavos ‘people of the thorns’)
- Jotoi Lhavos, people of the esparto grass
- Tavashai Lhavos, people of the savanna.

== Name ==
Nivaclé is an autonym, meaning "human." They are also known as the Ashlushlay [aɬuɬaj], Axluslay, Chulupí, and Nivaklé people.

== Language ==
They speak the Nivaclé language, which has two dialects: Forest Nivaclé and River Nivaclé. Nivaclé is one of the Mataco-Guaicuru languages. A dictionary has been published for the language, and the Bible was translated into Nivaclé in 1995.
