= Vachellia aroma var. aroma =

Scientific classification
- Kingdom: Plantae
- Clade: Tracheophytes
- Clade: Angiosperms
- Clade: Eudicots
- Clade: Rosids
- Order: Fabales
- Family: Fabaceae
- Subfamily: Caesalpinioideae
- Clade: Mimosoid clade
- Genus: Vachellia
- Species: V. aroma (Gillies ex Hook. & Arn.) Seigler & Ebinger
- Variety: V. a. var. aroma

Trinomial name
- Vachellia aroma var. aroma

Variety of legume

Vachellia aroma var. aroma is a large shrub or small tree which grows up to 6 m high. It is found in southern South America.
