= Mamoré–Guaporé linguistic area =

Linguistic area of South America

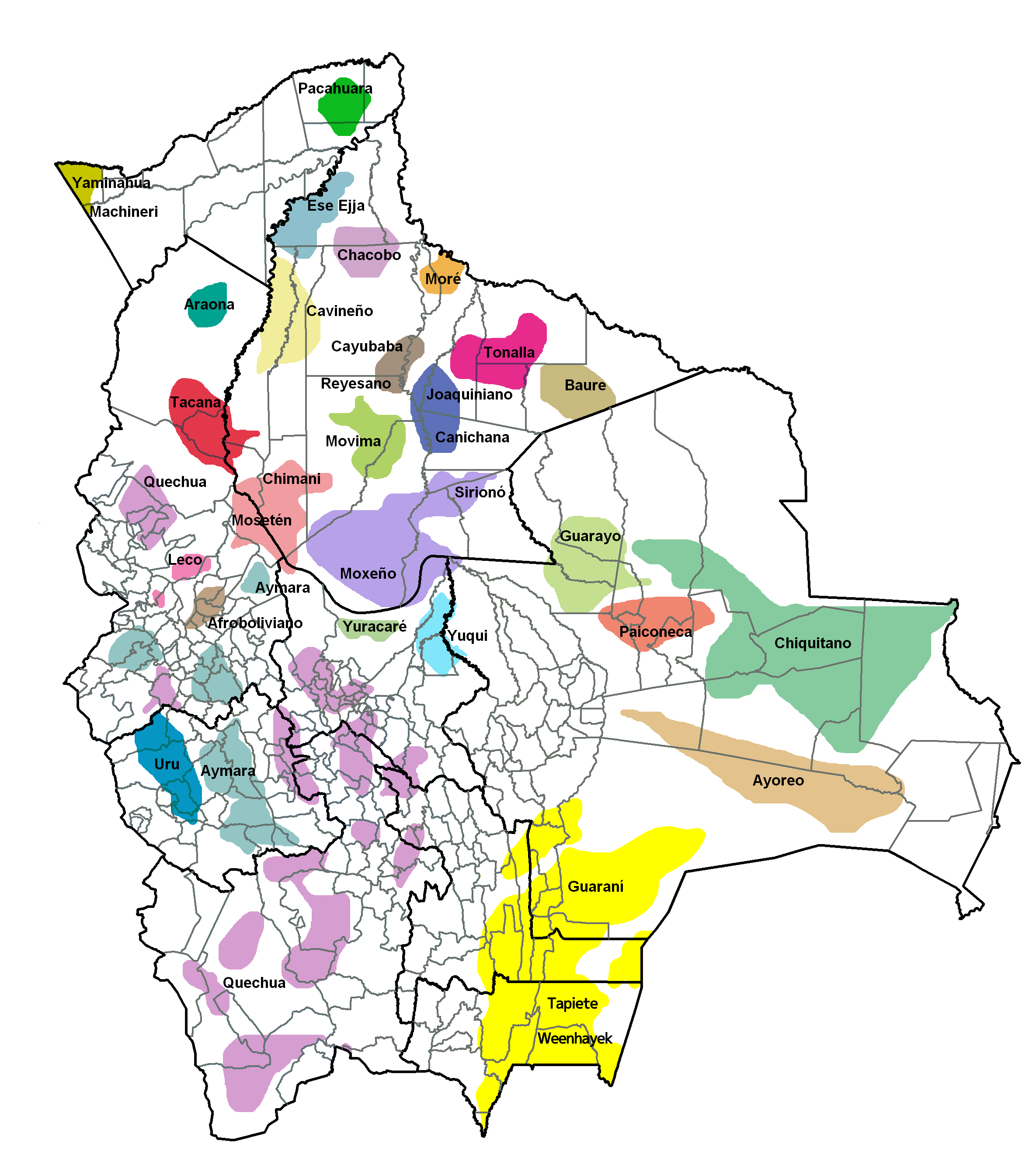
Map of the locations of the indigenous settlements of Bolivia

The Mamoré–Guaporé linguistic area is a linguistic area that includes over a dozen South American language families and isolates of the Mamoré–Guaporé region of eastern lowland Bolivia (the Llanos de Moxos and Chiquitania regions) and Brazil (Rondônia and Mato Grosso states).

== Languages ==
Crevels and van der Voort (2008) propose a Mamoré–Guaporé linguistic area in eastern lowland Bolivia (in Beni Department and Santa Cruz Department) and Rondônia and northwestern Mato Grosso, Brazil. In Bolivia, many of the languages were historically spoken at the Jesuit Missions of Moxos and also the Jesuit Missions of Chiquitos. Language families and branches in the linguistic area are as follows.

- Chapacuran languages
- Tacanan languages
- a few Panoan languages
- Nambikwaran languages
- the Arawakan languages Moxo, Bauré, Paunaka, and other related varieties

Tupian branches in the Mamoré–Guaporé linguistic area are:

- Ramarama languages
- Puruborá language
- Mondé languages
- Tupari languages
- Arikem languages
- Guarayo languages (Tupi–Guarani group)
- some Guarani dialects (Tupi–Guarani group)

Macro-Jê branches in the Mamoré–Guaporé linguistic area are:

- Jabutian languages
- Rikbaktsá language
- Chiquitano (sister branch of Macro-Jê)

Language isolates in the linguistic area are:

- Cayuvava
- Itonama
- Movima
- Chimane/Mosetén
- Canichana
- Yuracaré
- Leco
- Mure
- Aikanã
- Kanoê
- Kwazá
- Irantxe
- Arara

== Linguistic features ==
Areal features include:

- a high incidence of prefixes
- evidentials
- directionals
- verbal number
- lack of nominal number
- lack of classifiers
- inclusive/exclusive distinction

Pieter Muysken et al. (2014) also performed a detailed statistical analysis of the Mamoré–Guaporé linguistic area.

== See also ==
- Linguistic areas of the Americas
- Chaco linguistic area
- Languages of Rondônia (Portuguese Wikipedia)
- Indigenous languages of South America
