= Chorote languages =

Matacoan language group of South America

Chorote
- Geographic distribution: Argentina, Bolivia, Paraguay
- Linguistic classification: Matacoan: Chorote
- Subdivisions: Iyo’wujwa Chorote; Iyojwa’ja Chorote

Language codes
- Glottolog: chor1274

The Chorote languages form a small group of indigenous language varieties spoken primarily in northwestern Argentina, and also in Paraguay and far-southeastern Bolivia. The languages are part of the Matacoan family, and are most closely related to Wichí. They are also known as Chorotí, Yofúaha, or Tsoloti.

== Languages ==
Gordon (2005) in Ethnologue divides Chorote into the following two languages.

- Chorote
  - Iyo’wujwa Chorote or Manhui (a.k.a. Manjuy)
  - Iyojwa’ja Chorote or Eklenhui (a.k.a. Eclenjuy, Eklehui, Chorote, Choroti)
