= Kadiwéu language =

Guaicuruan language

Kadiwéu
- Mbayá
- Native to: Brazil
- Region: Mato Grosso do Sul
- Ethnicity: Kadiweu, Mbayá
- Native speakers: 1,600 (2006)
- Language family: Guaicuruan: Kadiwéu
- Dialects: Kadiwéu; Beakeo †; Kinikinau-Guaicurú †; Mbayá proper †

Language codes
- ISO 639-3: kbc
- Glottolog: kadi1248
- ELP: Kadiwéu

Kadiwéu is a Guaicuruan language spoken by the Kadiweu people of Brazil, and historically by other Mbayá groups. It has around 1,200–1,800 people in Brazil. It is mainly a subject–verb–object language.

The name Kadiweu has variants such as Kaduveo, Caduveo, Kadivéu, and Kadiveo. This language is spoken near the Brazil-Paraguay border in the state of Mato Grosso do Sul. The nearest town is Bodoquena, which is 60 kilometers away. According to data collected in 1999 by FUNAI, the total population of the Kadiwéu is 1,014; however, more recent data collected in 2014 shows that the population increased to 1,413 over the past couple of years, while the most recently researched data (from 1976) showed that there were 500 speakers of the language. None of the works on Kadiweu discussed the level of endangerment.

== History ==
The first accounts of the Kadiwéu people date back to the 16th century, where European expeditions documented the existence of this indigenous people. The Kadiwéu people were often referred to as the "horseman Indians." However, as the centuries went by the group found itself stuck between the two imperial powers of Spain and Portugal. During the wars between Paraguay and Brazil, the Kadiwéu fought on the latter side. This ensured that the Kadiwéu held the rights to their territory. Nevertheless, in recent times the relations between Kadiwéu and cattle ranchers have become more hostile. This is due to the penetration of cattle farmers into the original Kadiwéu lands, which were gained by fighting and sacrificing their lives. However, in the 1950s cattle ranchers gained official permission from the SPI (Indian Protective Service) to usurp the Kadiwéu territory to raise cattle on.

== Documentation ==
In terms of the linguistic literature on Kadiweu, linguists Glyn and Cynthia Griffiths published an entire Kadiweu–Portuguese dictionary in 2002. Glyn Griffiths also translated the Old and New Testament of the Bible into Kadiweu. Linguist Filomena Sandalo, who worked with the Kadiweu people for a couple of years, offers an extensive analysis of the morphological components of the language.

Projects that began working with Kadiweu were created in the mid-1950s. However, they were short lived due to unexplained reasons. However, in 1968 the Griffiths partnered with SIL (Sociedade Internacional de Lingüística), which led to the documentation of the Kadiweu language. Their book Aspectos da Língua Kadiweu discussed the formation and grammatical structure of the language. Moreover, an influential source according to Povos Indigenas no Brazil is the 18th-century ethnographic account of Kadiwéu by F. José Sanchez-Labrador. The work of linguist Maria Filomena Sandalo, A Grammar of Kadiweu, presents a general description of the language.

== Phonology ==
=== Vowels ===
	Front	Central	Back
Close	i ⟨i⟩ iː ⟨ii⟩		
Mid	e ⟨e⟩ eː ⟨ee⟩		o ⟨o⟩ oː ⟨oo⟩
Open		a ⟨a⟩ aː ⟨aa⟩	

- /e eː/ can often be heard as close mid [ɛ ɛː].
- /o oː/ is heard as [u uː] when before dental consonants.
- /a/ is realized as [ʌ] before a uvular consonant.
- /a/ before /e/ can then be heard as a long vowel sound [æː].

=== Consonants ===
		Bilabial	Alveolar	Post- alveolar	Palatal	Velar	Uvular
Stop	voiceless	p ⟨p⟩	t ⟨t⟩			k ⟨c⟩	q ⟨k⟩
Stop	voiced	b ⟨b⟩	d ⟨d⟩			ɡ ⟨g⟩	ɢ ~ ʁ ⟨ǥ⟩
Stop	fortis	bː ⟨bb⟩	dː ⟨dd⟩			ɡː ⟨gg⟩	
Affricate	voiceless			t͡ʃ ⟨x⟩			
Affricate	voiced			d͡ʒ ⟨j⟩			
Nasal	voiced	m ⟨m⟩	n ⟨n⟩				
Nasal	fortis	mː ⟨mm⟩	nː ⟨nn⟩				
Approximant	voiced		l ⟨l⟩		j ⟨y⟩	w ⟨w⟩	
Approximant	fortis		lː ⟨ll⟩		jː ⟨yy⟩	wː ⟨ww⟩	

- /d͡ʒ/ is heard as [ʒ] in free variation among speakers.
- /ɢ/ is typically heard as a uvular fricative [ʁ].
- /d/ is heard as a tap [ɾ] within intervocalic positions.

== Grammar ==
=== Morphology ===
==== Valency ====
Valency is defined as "the number and type of bonds which the verb may form with a number of dependent elements referred to as arguments". Valency change is the number of arguments controlled by a verbal predicate. While there are two types of valency change, reducing and increasing, after analyzing Sandalo's data it appears that Kadiweu has an increasing valency change. This author uses valency change to refer to the syntactically relevant components of meaning specified in the lexicon of Kadiweu. She claims that the [+cause] and [+become] features of the language must be added as suffixes in order for the verb to become a predicate. She proposes that the suffixes operate by adding or deleting the [+cause] and or [+become] feature.

For example, as seen in example 278 below, the root is a verb. However, in example 279 a suffix that denotes [+cause] is added which changes the meaning of the sentence.

jajipa
j-ajipa
1SG.SUBJ-listen
'I listen.'

jataqatidi
j-ataGa-ti-d
1SG.SUBJ-bamboo-[+cause]-ATEL
'I do bamboo searching.'

She claims that verbs are lexically specified for [+cause] and [+become] and that they fit into three categories. The first category is monovalent verbs, where there is only one semantic argument and it consists of both unergative verbs and unaccusative verbs. An example of a monovalent verb is seen in example (280) below. Non-accusative verbs only take an internal argument, and within their semantics is something that undergoes a change of state, ([+become]). However, non-ergative verbs take an external argument, and the idea of something causing what is being expressed ([+cause]) is expressed in their meaning. As a result, the implied meaning in the example below is 'I cause yelling' rather than just 'I yell'.

japawa
j-apawa
1SG.SUBJ-yell
'I yell.' [I cause yelling]

The second category is bivalent verbs, which make an obligatory reference to the subject and cause of become. For example, the author shows how the verb "eat" can also be a bivalent verb because it requires two semantic arguments, as seen in example (282) below. Sandalo expresses the action of bivalent verbs as an equation which states "x cause y become STATE." This formula is shown in the implied meaning 'I cause guava (to) become eaten':

e: jeligo wayaba.
e:m j-eligo wayaba
1.PN 1SG.SUBJ-eat guava
'I eat guava.' [I cause guava (to) become eaten]

The third category is trivalent verbs which make an obligatory reference to a third party argument. The formula Sandalo uses to explain these verbs is: x cause y become LOCATION. This formula is explained in example (283) below

aqa:m:i jajigotGawa Gatodi
aqa:m:i j-ajigo-t+Ga-wa Gatodi
2.PN 1SG.SUBJ-give-REL+2SG.CL-DAT toucan
'I give the toucan to you.' [I cause the toucan become transferred to you]

In Kadiweu, suffixes can be added to the verb to alter the meaning of the verb. Sandalo identifies four types of suffixes that can be added:

1. [+cause]
2. [-cause]
3. [+become]
4. [-beccome]

By adding these suffixes to a verb, valency change occurs. For example, in example (284) below a bare root is shown. Since it is non-accusative, the implied meaning contains [+become] thus making it 'his knife becomes sharpened'. However, in example (285) when the [+cause] suffix -Gad is added to the non-accusative verb it creates a bivalent (x cause y become STATE) verb:

lod:ajo dal:epe
l-od:ajo y-d:-al:epe
3.POSS-knife 3SG.SUBJ-theme-sharp
'His knife is sharp.' [His knife becomes sharpened]

jal:epeGadi lod:a:jo.
j-al:epe-Gad l-od:a:jo
1SG.SUBJ-sharp-[+cause] 3.POSS-knife
'I sharpen his knife.' [I cause his knife (to) become sharpened]

In conclusion, while Sandalo does not explicitly state that this is an increasing valency change, she identifies a causative suffix which is a typical valency-increasing device. As a result, Kadiweu uses these various suffixes to express valency change.

==== Tense ====
According to Sandalo, Kadiweu "has no tense markers" but rather aspect, which is marked on the verb. These aspects mark the duration or type of temporal activity. In Kadiweu, there are seven aspectual markers:

1. completive
2. incompletive
3. durative
4. telic
5. atelic
6. repetitive
7. intensive

The first aspect, completive, marked with, jaG+, means that the event has been completed.

nige an:ati Gatodi oda jajopi.
nige a-n-na-d-i Gatodi oda jaG+j-opil
COMP 2SG.SUBJ-hither-see-ATEL-PL toucan then COMPL+1SG.SUBJ-go.away
'When you see a toucan, I will have gone away.'

The second aspect, incompletive, bGa+, is added when the event is not complete but the event has not taken place yet.

nige daGa enagi dom:ojya natigi nigoy, bGajawaligi.
nige daGa y-ane-g dom:ojya natigi nigoy bGa+j-awaligi
COMP NEG 3SG.SUBJ-come-TLC car next morning INCOMPL+1SG.SUBJ-walk
'If the car does not come tomorrow, I will walk away.'

The third aspect, durative, marked by banaGa+, which stresses the event occurring, regardless of when it and if it will happen.

banaGa datyodi.
banaGa y-d:atyo-d
DUR 3SG.SUBJ-theme-rain-ATEL
'It is raining.'

The fourth, being telic events, have a clear terminal point. These events are marked by the suffix -g.

jicigitike.
j-ici-g-t+ke
1SG.SUBJ-pull-TLC-REL+outward
'I pulled it away.'

The fifth are atelic events, which are marked by -d. This aspect has no natural point.

id:icitike.
i-d:-ici-t+ke
1SG.OBJ-theme-pull-REL+outward
'I was pulled back and forth.'

The sixth and seventh aspects, repetitive and intensive, are marked by +ak and +bigi.
