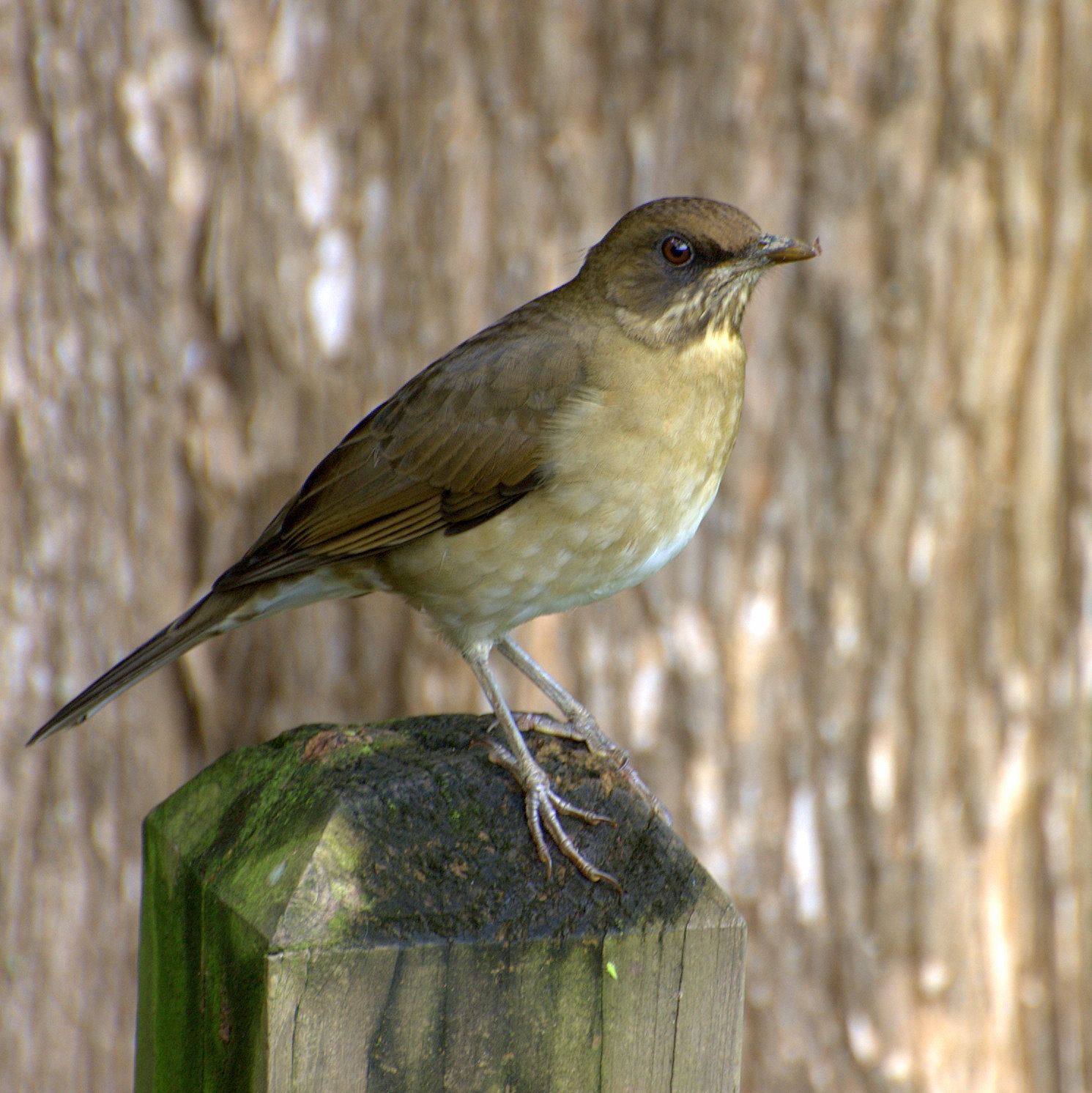

Conservation status
- Least Concern (IUCN 3.1)

Scientific classification
- Kingdom: Animalia
- Phylum: Chordata
- Class: Aves
- Order: Passeriformes
- Family: Turdidae
- Genus: Turdus
- Species: T. amaurochalinus

Binomial name
- Turdus amaurochalinus Cabanis, 1851

Audio
- Song of creamy-bellied thrush

= Creamy-bellied thrush =

Species of bird

The creamy-bellied thrush (Turdus amaurochalinus) is a species of bird in the family Turdidae. It is found in Argentina, Bolivia, Brazil, Paraguay, Peru, Uruguay, and as a vagrant to Chile and the Falkland Islands.

== Taxonomy and systematics ==
The creamy-bellied thrush was originally described in 1851 with its current binomial Turdus amaurochalinus It is monotypic.

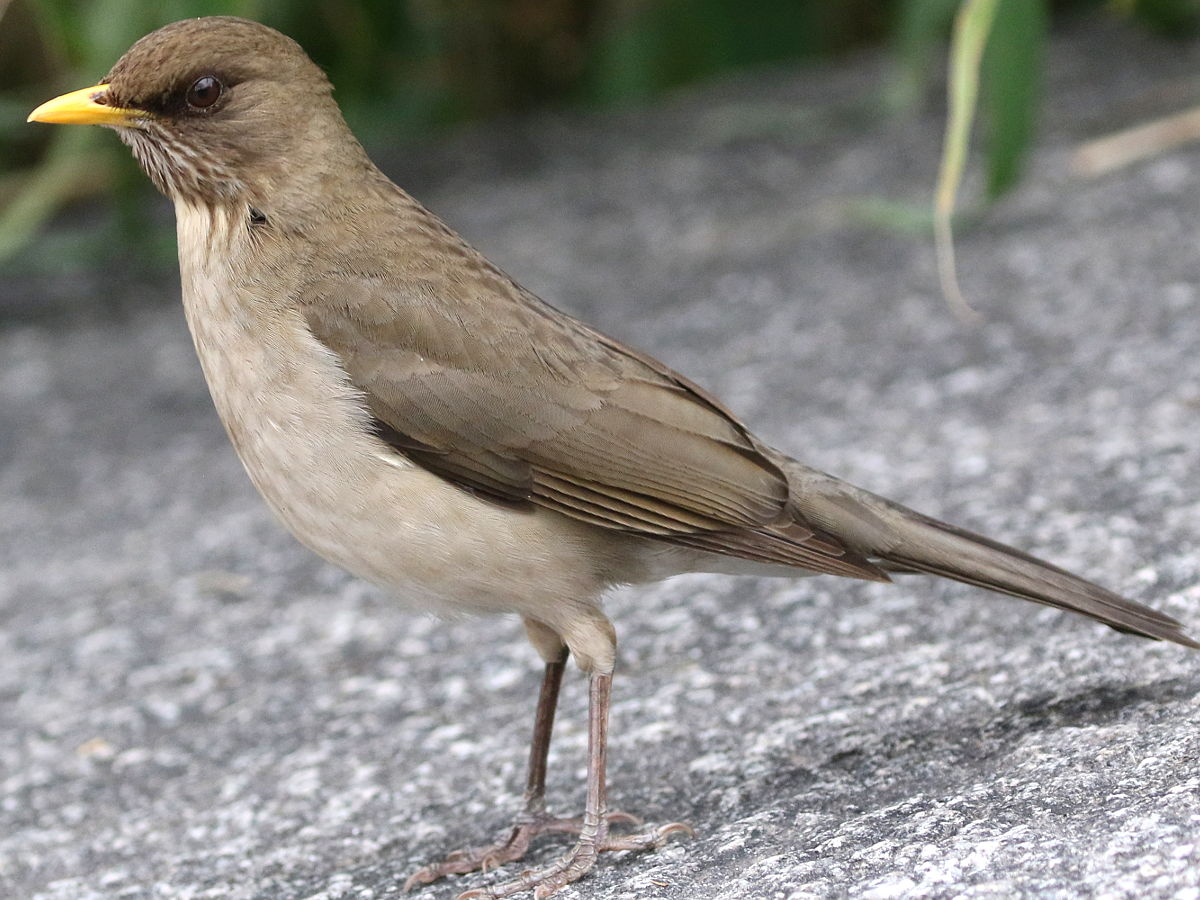
At Costanera Sur Ecological Reserve, Argentina

== Description ==
The creamy-bellied thrush is 22 to 25 cm (8.7 to 9.8 in) long and weighs 52 to 73 g (1.8 to 2.6 oz). The sexes have the same plumage. Adults have a mostly olive-brown head with black lores and a brown-streaked white throat. Their upperparts, wings, and tail are the same olive-brown as the head. Their breast and flanks are usually grayish buff that becomes creamy white on the belly and undertail coverts. (Some individuals have pure gray instead of grayish buff underparts.) They have a dark iris, a yellowish bill when breeding and a darker one otherwise, and drab brown legs and feet. Juveniles have dark brown upperparts with buff spots and streaks, mostly brown-mottled buff underparts, and a white chin and belly.

== Distribution and habitat ==
The creamy-bellied thrush is found from extreme eastern Ucayali and eastern Madre de Dios departments in southeastern Peru east across Brazil roughly following a line from southern Acre to central Tocantins and from there north to the Atlantic in Pará. From there its range continues south through the rest of Brazil, eastern Bolivia, Paraguay, and Uruguay into Argentina. In Argentina it occurs along the eastern slope of the Andes south to Río Negro Province and on the Atlantic to Buenos Aires Province. It has also been recorded as a vagrant in Chile and on the Falkland Islands.

The creamy-bellied thrush inhabits a wide variety of semi-open to open landscapes. These include cerrado, light forest and woodland, the edges of denser forest, middle-aged secondary forest, scrublands and thorny thickets, and human-modified areas such as farmland, parks, and gardens. It is primarily a bird of the lowlands and reaches its highest elevation of 2,600 m (8,500 ft) in Bolivia.

== Behavior ==
=== Movement ===
The creamy-bellied thrush is a partial migrant though its exact pattern is not clear. It breeds south of a line roughly from central Bolivia east and across Brazil from central Mato Grosso to Espírito Santo. Some individuals remain there year-round but the majority move north into the rest of the species' range in the non-breeding season.

=== Feeding ===
The creamy-bellied thrush feeds on invertebrates and fruit. It forages mostly in trees but will do so on the ground near cover.

=== Breeding ===
The creamy-bellied thrush's breeding season has not been fully defined but includes November in Brazil, March in Argentina, and February and March in Bolivia. It builds a cup nest from grass, sticks, moss, and other plant material held together with mud or cattle dung and lined with rootlets. It typically is placed in a thick bush or hedge between about 0.6 and 1.6 m (2 and 5 ft) above the ground. The usual clutch is three eggs but clutches of four are known. The eggs are bluish green with reddish or brown markings. The incubation period is about 15 days and fledging occurs 14 to 15 days after hatch. Details of parental care are not known. There are records of brood parasitism by the shiny cowbird (Molothrus bonariensis).

=== Vocalization ===
The creamy-bellied thrush's song is a "simple, little varied, yet musical series with short notes, like tjurre, wurr, tjeeh, and tjut-tjeé". Its calls include a "sharp pok", a "psiip in or before flight", and as a warning a "sharp kitten-like pchuo".

== Status ==
The IUCN has assessed the creamy-bellied thrush as being of Least Concern. It has an extremely large range; its population size is not known and is believed to be decreasing. No immediate threats have been identified. In Brazil it is "common to frequent" in its breeding range, "frequent to uncommon" in the eastern part of its winter range, and "uncommon to rare" in the western part. It is common in Paraguay and Uruguay and uncommon in Peru.
