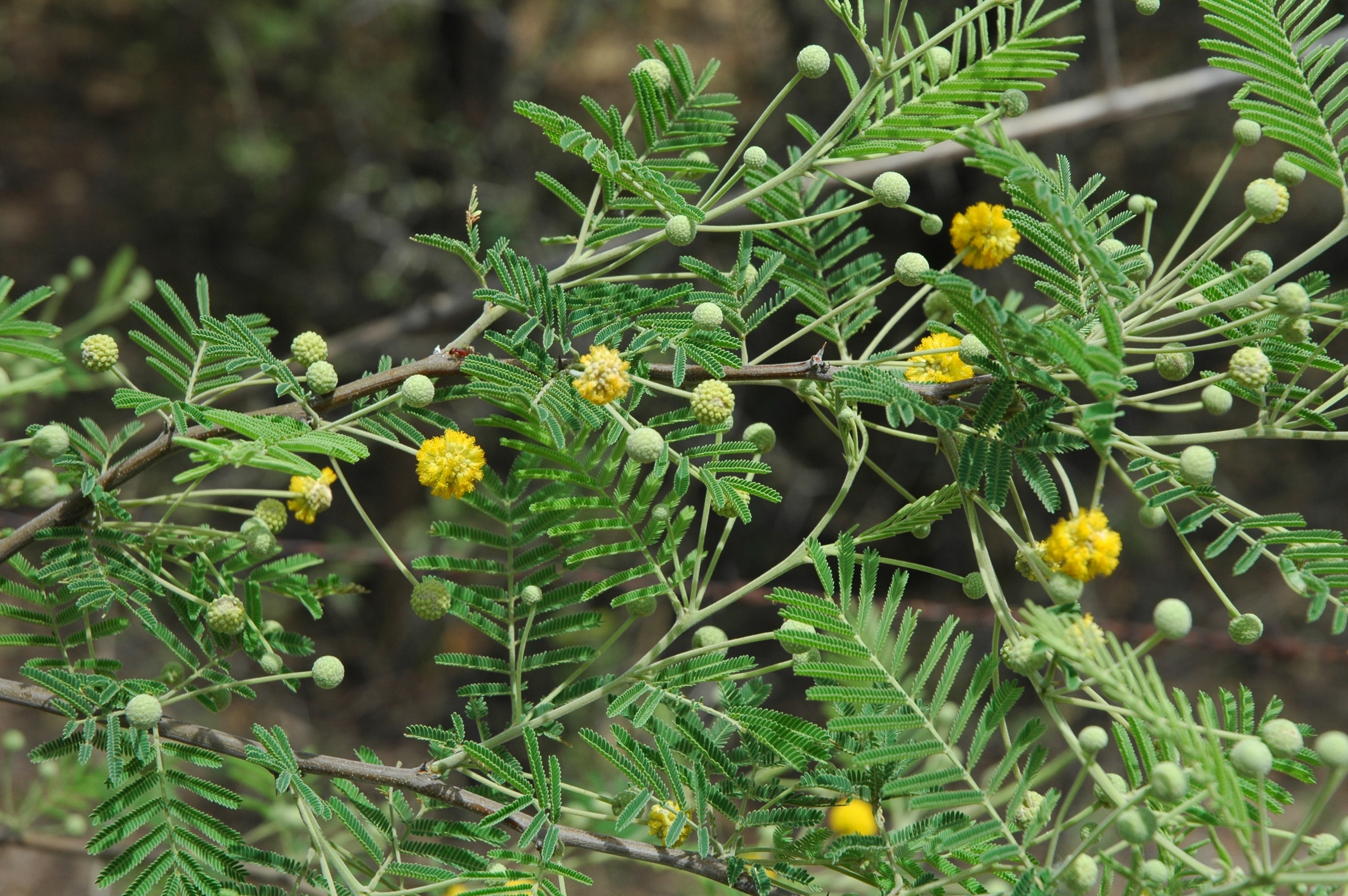

Scientific classification
- Kingdom: Plantae
- Clade: Tracheophytes
- Clade: Angiosperms
- Clade: Eudicots
- Clade: Rosids
- Order: Fabales
- Family: Fabaceae
- Subfamily: Caesalpinioideae
- Clade: Mimosoid clade
- Genus: Vachellia
- Species: V. aroma

Binomial name
- Vachellia aroma (Gillies ex Hook. & Arn.) Seigler & Ebinger
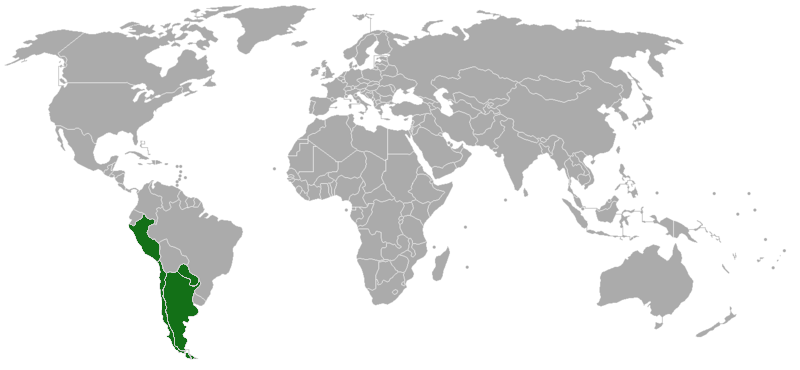
- Range of Vachellia aroma

Synonyms
- Acacia aroma Gillies ex Hook. & Arn.; Acacia moniliformis Griseb.

= Vachellia aroma =

Species of legume

Vachellia aroma is a small, perennial, thorny tree native to Peru, Chile, Argentina and Paraguay. Some common names for it are aromita, aromo negro, espinillo and tusca. It is not listed as being a threatened species. Although some sources say that Vachellia macracantha is synonymous with Vachellia aroma, genetic analysis of the two species has shown that they are different, but that they are closely related.

== Uses ==
Vachellia aroma is used by bees to make honey. The tree's wood is quite hard and it is used for implements, posts and firewood.

== Botanical varieties ==
- Vachellia aroma var. aroma
- Vachellia aroma var. huarango
