= Iyoʼwujwa Chorote =

Matacoan language of South America

Manjuy
- Chorote
- Iyoʼawujwaʼ
- Native to: Argentina, Paraguay, Bolivia
- Ethnicity: Manjui/Inkijwas
- Native speakers: 1,900 (2007–2012)
- Language family: Mataco–Guaicuru ?: Matacoan; Manjuy
- Dialects: Manjui; Iyoʼwujwa

Language codes
- ISO 639-3: crq
- Glottolog: iyow1239
- ELP: Chorote (shared); Chorote

Iyoʼwujwa' Chorote is a Matacoan language spoken by about 2,000 people, mostly in Argentina where it is spoken by about 1,500 people; 50% of whom are monolingual.

Alternate names include Choroti, Manjuy, and Manjui. It is distinct from the similarly named Iyojwaʼja Chorote who reside exclusively in Argentina.

In 2012, there were officially 582 speakers in Paraguay, according to the 2012 Censo Indigena del Paraguay. This number grew from 450 in 2004 according to the official census of that year. By the census of 2019, some believe that this number reached between 650 and 900 speakers in Paraguay. One reason why it was hard to count these people accurately may have been due to the fact that in many places where the census was taken, some speakers counted themselves to be Nivaclé people. This was possibly due to economic reasons; the Nivaclé were thought to get more help from the local government, and in many locations the two groups of people lived together in the same community. Of the 650 in Paraguay, approximately 480 were considered monolingual in 2022. These speakers in Paraguay only refer to themselves as Manjui or Inkijwas, though there is a small group along the Pilcomayo River that refer to themselves as Lumnanas. They refer to the Chorote residing in Argentina as Iyoʼawujwaʼ (those who say ʼawujwaʼ), though some who reside with these people in Argentina have probably migrated from Paraguay. Most of the Manjui under 40 years old can read and write in their own language and were taught in their own schools. The principal location of these people is a settlement called Santa Rosa, in the province of Boquerón. This settlement was originally founded by North American missionaries. Other locations where these people reside include Mcal. Estigarribia, Pedro P. Peña, Colony 22, and Yakaquash. Aside from the settlement of Santa Rosa, each of these other communities share their area with the Nivaclé as was mentioned above. Many understand each other's language but many still speak their own particular language to the other speaker.

== Phonology ==
=== Vowels ===
Chorote has 6 vowels.

	Front	Back
Close	i	u
Close-mid	e	o
Open	a	ɑ

=== Consonants ===
Chorote has 19 consonants.

		Bilabial	Alveolar	Palatal	Velar	Glottal	
		Bilabial	Alveolar	Palatal	Velar	plain	labialized
Nasal		m	n				
Stop	plain	p	t		k	ʔ	
Stop	ejective	pʼ	tʼ		kʼ		
Affricate	plain			t͡ʃ			
Affricate	ejective		t͡sʼ	t͡ʃʼ			
Fricative			s			h	hʷ
Approximant	voiceless		ɫ̥				
Approximant	voiced		l	j	w		
