= Payagua language =

Extinct language of South America

Payaguá
- Payawá
- Evueví
- Native to: Argentina, Paraguay
- Ethnicity: Payaguá people
- Extinct: 1942, with the death of María Dominga Miranda
- Language family: Language isolate (Mataco–Guaicuru?)

Language codes
- ISO 639-3: None (mis)
- Glottolog: paya1236

Payaguá (Payawá) is an extinct language isolate, proposed to be a member of the Mataco–Guaicuru languages, formerly spoken in Paraguay and Argentina by the Payaguá.

== Classification ==
Viegas Barros (2004) proposed that Payaguá may be a Macro-Guaicurúan language. However, Campbell (2012) classifies Payagua as a language isolate.

== Dialects ==
Two distinct dialects of Payaguá are distinguished by José Pedro Viegas Barros (2024), who proposes that either one is derived from the other, or that the two varieties coexisted at one time, but one was replaced by the other.

== Vocabulary ==
A total of 630 words are known in the language.

Payaguá	Gloss
yam	I
hamo	you
yoro	he
