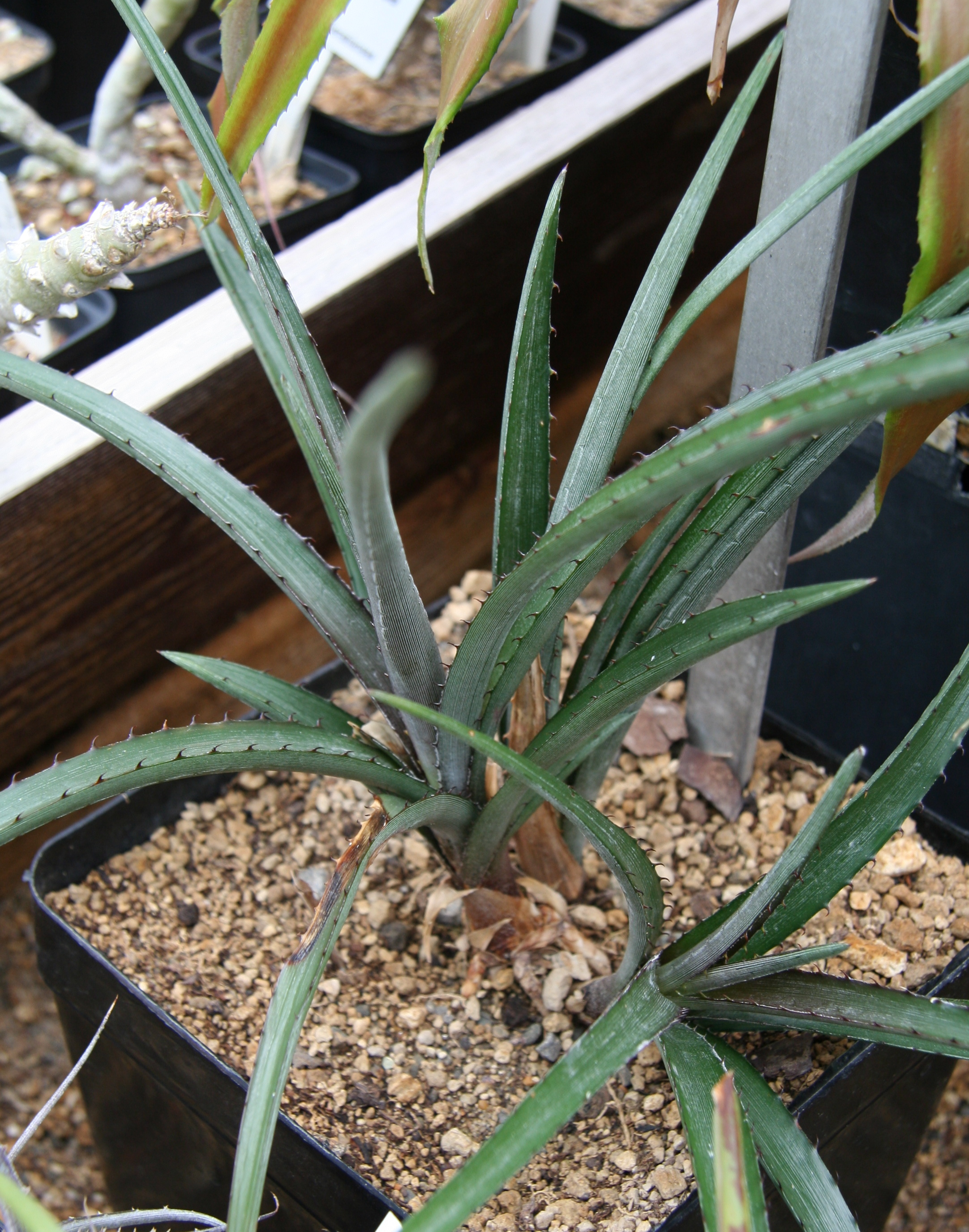

Scientific classification
- Kingdom: Plantae
- Clade: Embryophytes
- Clade: Tracheophytes
- Clade: Spermatophytes
- Clade: Angiosperms
- Clade: Monocots
- Clade: Commelinids
- Order: Poales
- Family: Bromeliaceae
- Subfamily: Bromelioideae
- Genus: Deinacanthon; Mez
- Species: D. urbanianum

Binomial name
- Deinacanthon urbanianum (Mez) Mez

Synonyms
- Bromelia urbaniana (Mez) L.B.Sm.; Rhodostachys urbaniana Mez

= Deinacanthon =

Genus of flowering plants

Deinacanthon is a genus of flowering plants in the family Bromeliaceae, subfamily Bromelioideae. The genus name is from the Greek “deinos” - terrible and “anthos” - flower. It contains a single species, Deinacanthon urbanianum, native to Bolivia, Paraguay and Argentina. In Spanish, it is known as cháguar.
