= Mbia (surname) =

Mbia is a surname. Notable people with the surname include:

- Guillaume Oyônô Mbia (1939–2021), Cameroonian writer
- Julien Andavo Mbia (1950–2024), Congolese Roman Catholic prelate
- Stéphane Mbia (born 1986), Cameroonian football defensive midfielder and defender
