= Iyojwaʼja Chorote =

Matacoan language of Argentina

Eklenhui
- Chorote
- Iyojwaʼajaʼ
- Native to: Argentina
- Native speakers: 800 (2007)
- Language family: Mataco–Guaicuru ?: Matacoan; Eklenhui

Language codes
- ISO 639-3: crt
- Glottolog: iyoj1235
- ELP: Chorote (shared)

Eklenhui (Iyojwaʼja Chorote) is a language spoken in northeastern Salta, Argentina, by about 800 people. It is also known as Choroti, Yofuaha, and Eklenjuy.

It is separate from the similarly named Iyoʼwujwa Chorote.
