= Mataguayan languages =

Language family of South America

Matákoan
- Mataguayo
- Geographic distribution: Chaco region
- Linguistic classification: Mataco–Guaicuru ?: Matákoan
- Subdivisions: Wichí; Chorote; Nivaĉle; Maká

Language codes
- Glottolog: mata1289
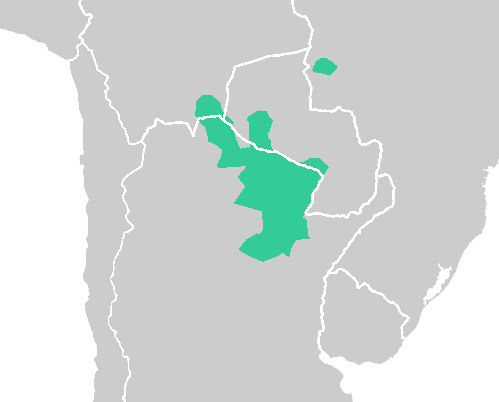

Mataguayan (also Matacoan, Matákoan, Mataguayo, Mataco–Mataguayo, Matacoano, Matacoana) is a language family of northern Argentina, western Paraguay, and southeastern Bolivia.

== Family division ==
Matacoan consists of four clusters of languages: Wichí, Chorote, Nivaĉle, and Maká. Wichí and Chorote constitute a well-supported clade within the family. It has also been proposed that Maká and Nivaĉle form a clade, however, Nivaĉle also shares several innovations with Chorote–Wichí, casting doubt on the validity of the Maká–Nivaĉle clade.

Gordon (2005) in Ethnologue divides Wichí into three separate languages and Chorote into two languages.

- Matacoan
  - Wichí-Chorote
    - Wichí (also known as Mataco, Wichi, Wichí Lhamtés, Weenhayek, Noctenes, Matahuayo, Matako, Weʃwo. The name Mataco is common but pejorative.)
      - Vejoz (also known as Vejo, Pilcomayo, Bermejo, Wichí Lhamtés Vejoz)
      - Noktén (also known as Noctén, Wichí Lhamtés Nocten)
      - Wiznay (also known as Güisnay, Wichí Lhamtés Güisnay)
      - Matawayo (also known as Matahuayo)
    - Chorote (also known as Chorotí, Yofúaha, Tsoloti)
      - Manhui (also known as Manjuy, Manjui, Iyo’wujwa Chorote)
      - Eklenhui (also known as Eclenjuy, Eklehui, Iyojwa’ja Chorote, Chorote, Choroti)
  - (?) Maká-Nivaclé
    - Nivaclé (also known as Nivaĉle, Chulupí–Ashlushlay, Chulupí, Ajlujlay, Alhulhai, Niwaklé, Niwaqli, Churupi, Chulupe. The name Chulupí is common but pejorative.)
      - Forest Nivaclé
      - River Nivaclé
    - Maká (also known as Macá, Maca, Towolhi, Toothle, Nynaka, Mak’á, Enimaca, Enimaga)
      - Ma’ká (also known as Towolhi)
      - Enimaga (also known as Enimaa, Kochaboth)

=== Mason (1950) ===
Internal classification by Mason (1950):

- Mataco-Maca
  - Mataco
    - Mataco-Mataguayo
      - Mataco
        - Guisnay
        - Nocten (Octenai)
      - Mataguayo
        - Northern: Hueshuo, Pesatupe, Abucheta
        - Southern: Vejoz
    - Chorotí-Ashluslay
      - Chorotí (Yofuaha)
      - Ashluslay (Chulupí, Chonopí, Sukin, Sotiagay, Tapieté)
  - Macá (Enimagá, Cochaboth, Guaná, Lengua)
    - Enimagá
      - Macá (Towothli, Toosle)
    - Guentusé
    - Cochaboth-Lengua

=== Nikulin & Carol (2024) ===
Internal classification by Nikulin & Carol (2024):

- Mataguayan
  - Maká
    - Fisket Ɫeiɫets
    - Aseptiket Ɫeiɫets
  - Nivaĉle
    - Chishamnee Lhavos
    - Shichaam Lhavos
    - Yita’ Lhavos
  - Chorote–Wichí
    - Chorote
      - Iyojwa’aja’
      - Iyo’awujwa’–Manjui
        - Iyo’awujwa’
        - Manjui
          - Jlimnájnas
          - Jlawá’a Wos
    - Wichí
      - Northwestern Wichí
        - ’Weenhayek
        - Guisnay (Lower Pilcomayeño)
        - Vejoz
      - Southeastern Wichí
        - Rivadavia
        - Lower Bermejeño

== Proto-language ==
Major reconstructions of Proto-Mataguayo include those by Viegas Barros (2002) (see the corresponding Spanish article for a list of reconstructions) and Nikulin & Carol (2024).

=== Animal and plant names ===
The following reconstructions of Proto-Mataguayan animal and plant names are from Nikulin & Carol (2024).

Abbreviations

- (MN): reflexes only in Maká and Nivaclé, although the reconstructions are still at the Proto-Mataguayan level
- (ChW): reflexes only in Chorote and Wichí, although the reconstructions are still at the Proto-Mataguayan level

==== Invertebrates ====
Proto-Mataguayan	Gloss	Notes
*ɸátsu(ˀ)χ, *ɸátshu-ts	‘centipede’	
*ɸínä(ˀ)χ	‘crab’	
*ɸiˀs	‘leech’	
*ɸít’i(ʔ) ~ *ɸít’ih	‘dragonfly’	
*lǻp’ih ~ *lǻɸ’ih	‘snail’	
*(-)ɬaʔ, *(-)ɬá-ts	‘louse’	
*ɬeɬ	‘white snail’	
*ˀwóså(ˀ)q ~ *ˀwóså(ˀ)k	‘butterfly’	
*ʔǻnitih	‘wasp sp.’	
*ʔéjaʔ (*-l)	‘mosquito’	
*ɸánhaʔ ~ *ɸä́nhaʔ (*-jʰ)	‘locust’	(MN)
*sålå(ˀ)l, *sålål-its	‘middle-sized cicada’	(MN)
*ɸ(u)nájXV(ˀ)j	‘earthworm, amphisbaenian’	(ChW)
*kóˀl	‘locust’	(ChW)
*wóna(ʔ)	‘bala wasp (Polybia ruficeps) honey(comb); hat’	(ChW)

==== Fish ====
Proto-Mataguayan	Gloss	Notes
*pxúse-naˀχ	‘bearded; gilded catfish’	
*k’unhate-nhaʔ (*-jʰ)	‘pacu fish’	(MN)
*sijå(ˀ)χ, *sijåχ-its	‘fish sp.’	(MN)
*(ˀ)wǻnaˀχ, *(ˀ)wǻnha-ts	‘piranha’	(MN)
*ʔutsi(h) (*-l)	‘marbled swamp eel’	(MN)
*ʔatsXa(ʔ), *ʔatsXá-l	‘dorado’	(ChW)

==== Reptiles and amphibians ====
Proto-Mataguayan	Gloss	Notes
*tós (*-its)	‘snake’	
*ʔáɬu(ʔ) (*-ts)	‘iguana’	
*ʔáɬu-taχ, *ʔáɬu-ta-ts	‘alligator’	
*ʔatuˀχ ~ *ʔatúˀχ	‘snake sp.’	
*ʔåˀlå	‘South American rattlesnake; caninana’	
*ʔåˀlǻ-taχ	‘Argentine boa’	
*ɸaxi(ˀ)j ~ *ɸäxi(ˀ)j	‘green ameiva (Ameiva ameiva)’	(MN)
*káˀlah, *káˀla-ts	‘lizard’	(ChW)
*ktáˀnih, *ktáˀni-ts	‘Chaco tortoise’	(ChW)
*s’ǻm (*-its)	‘frog sp.’	
*pǻˀjih	‘frog (Leptodactylus sp.)’	(ChW)
*tǻtsna(ˀ)X₁₂ ~ *tǻtsne(ˀ)χ	‘toad’	(ChW)

==== Birds ====
Proto-Mataguayan	Gloss	Notes
*ɸaʔáj (fruit); *ɸaʔáj-uˀk, *ɸaʔáj-ku-jʰ (tree)	‘white algarrobo (Prosopis alba)’	
*jit’åʔ, *jit’ǻ-l	‘turkey vulture’	
*kijápo(ˀ)p ?~ *k’ijápo(ˀ)p	‘common potoo (Nyctibius griseus)’	
*k’å ~ *k’ǻ	‘variable antshrike (Thamnophilus caerulescens)’	
*k’ék’eh	‘monk parakeet’	
*k’ú(t)sta(ˀ)χ, *k’ú(t)sta-ts	‘American barn owl (Tyto furcata)’	
*mijó (*-l)	‘savannah hawk’	
*ˀmók (*-its)	‘creamy-bellied thrush (Turdus amaurochalinus)’	
*pǻnhajeχ ~ *pånhájeχ ~ *pånhajéχ	‘neotropic cormorant’	
*påttséχ	‘jabiru’	
*pí(t)staʔ	‘masked gnatcatcher’	
*sát’a(ˀ)(t)s	‘parakeet sp.’	
*stwúˀn, *stwún-its	‘king vulture’	
*tilVχ ~ *tílVχ ~ *tilV́χ	‘white woodpecker’	
*túsu(ˀ)(t)s	‘lesser yellowlegs’	
*t’isåʔ ~ *t’isǻʔ (*-l)	‘cream-backed woodpecker (Campephilus leucopogon)’	
*tsåhǻq (*-its)	‘chajá bird’	
*tsijáʔ ?~ *ts’ijáʔ	‘caracara (Milvago sp.)’	
*tsiwáɬqoɬ	‘little nightjar (Setopagis parvula)’	
*tsoˀm ~ *tsóˀm	‘plush-crested jay (Cyanocorax chrysops)’	
*ts’áts’ih, *ts’áts’i-l	‘rufous hornero’	
*ˀwǻnXåɬåχ, *ˀwǻnXåɬå-ts	‘rhea’	
*xókhajeχ	‘Muscovy duck’	
*(ʔa)X₁₃útsa(ˀ)χ, *(ʔa)X₁₃útsha-ts	‘crested caracara’	
*ʔáp’a(ˀ)χ ~ *ʔáɸ’a(ˀ)χ	‘jararaca’	
*ʔáxaʔ	‘stork’	
*ʔéle(ʔ)	‘parrot’	
*ʔóɸoʔ (*-ts)	‘picazuro pigeon (Patagioenas picazuro)’	
*ʔúlʔåh, *ʔúlʔå-ts	‘dove (Columbina sp.)’	
*jinqå-(ju)ˀk, *jinqå-ku-jʰ (tree); *jinqåˀ-p, *jinqå-p-its (season)	‘white algarrobo (Prosopis alba)’	(MN)
*kómiʔ	‘Chilean flamingo (Phoenicopterus chilensis)’	(MN)
*teχ (*-its)	‘parrot sp.’	(MN)
*på(ˀ)q	‘kind of zorzal (Turdus sp.)’	(ChW)
*qatsíwo(ʔ)	‘limpkin’	(ChW)
*silóʔtåɸV(ʔ) ?~ *siwóʔtåɸe(ʔ)	‘Caatinga puffbird’	(ChW)
*spú(ˀ)p	‘dove’	(ChW)
*stǻɸe(ʔ)	‘Chaco chachalaca’	(ChW)
*wóp’ih ~ *wóɸ’ih ?~ *móp’ih ~ *móɸ’ih	‘snowy egret, great egret’	(ChW)
*wósak’V(ˀ)t	‘red-crested cardinal’	(ChW)

==== Mammals ====
Proto-Mataguayan	Gloss	Notes
*jiˀjåˀX₁₂	‘jaguar’	
*kɸá(t)s’i(ʔ)	‘Molina's hog-nosed skunk’	
*k’alxó, *k’alxó-ts	‘southern three-banded armadillo’	
*ˀlä́jX₂₃VnåX₁₃å	‘Azara's night monkey’	
*me(ʔ) ~ *mé(ʔ)	‘otter’	
*núʔuh, *núʔu-ts	‘dog’	
*ˀnjǻnxteʔ	‘Chacoan mara (cavy), tapeti’	
*slǻqha(ˀ)j, *slǻqhaj-its	‘wild cat’	
*sˀwúla(ˀ)χ, *sˀwúla-ts	‘anteater’	
*tänúk (*-its)	‘feline’ (‘cat’ in the contemporary languages)	
*xéjåʔ (*-l)	‘bat’	
*ʔámʔåh, *ʔámʔå-ts	‘rat’	
*ʔáqåtse(ˀ)χ	‘kind of armadillo’	
*ʔáwu(C)tseχ	‘Chacoan peccary; collared peccary’	
*ʔuwáɬe(ˀ)χ ?~ *C’uwáɬe(ˀ)χ	‘puma’	
*ʔVláʔah, *ʔVláʔa-ts	‘lesser grison’	
*ʔåɸínaˀχ, *ʔåɸínha-ts	‘black howler’	(MN)
*him (*-its)	‘coati’	(MN)
*jiʔixåtaχ, *jiʔixåta-ts	‘ocelot’	(MN)
*(ˀ)wawo(h) (*-l)	‘maned wolf’	(MN)
*(ˀ)wq’am ~ *(ˀ)wq’äm	‘white-eared opossum’	(MN)
*ʔåχtinaˀχ, *ʔåχtinha-ts	‘marsh deer (Blastocerus dichotomus)’	(MN)
*ʔujhVl	‘otter sp.’	(MN)
*níltsa(ˀ)X₁₂, *níltsX₁₃a-ts	‘white-lipped peccary’	(ChW)
*Xmáwoh; *Xmáwo-taχ, *Xmáwo-ta-ts	‘fox’	(ChW)

==== Plants ====
Proto-Mataguayan	Gloss	Notes
*ɸtsǻna(ˀ)χ	‘Baccharis sp.’	
*ɸts-uˀk, collective *ɸis-kat	‘Copernicia alba palm’	
*kéɬχa-juˀk, *kéɬχa-jku-jʰ	‘red quebracho (Schinopsis balansae)’	
*khǻt (fruit); *khǻt-uˀk, *khǻt-ku-jʰ (plant)	‘cactus’	
*lä́tseni(ʔ) (fruit); *lä́tsen-uˀk, *lä́tsen-ku-jʰ (tree)	‘chañar (Geoffroea decorticans)’	
*lóta-(ju)ˀk	‘iscayante tree (for making bows)’	
*náwa(ˀ)x	‘cactus sp.’	
*néwo(ˀ)k	‘wild manioc (Marsdenia castillonii)’	
*sát-uˀk, *sát-ku-jʰ	‘lecherón tree (Sapium haematospermum)’	
*sóp’wa(-ta)-juˀk, *sóp’wa(-ta)-jku-jʰ	‘caspi zapallo (Pisonia zapallo)’	
*sténi(ʔ) (fruit); *stén-uˀk (tree)	‘white quebracho (Aspidosperma quebracho-blanco)’	
*tsänúˀk	‘duraznillo (Ruprechtia triflora)’	
*tsóɸa (fruit)	‘Maytenus vitis-idaea’	
*tsóɸa-taχ (fruit); *tsóɸa-ta-(ju)ˀk (tree)	‘Lycium americanum’	
*wák’a(ʔ) (fruit); *wák’a-juˀk, *wák’a-jku-jʰ (tree)	‘guayacán (Libidibia paraguariensis)’	
*wátå(ˀ)χ (fruit); *wáth(å-j)uˀk (tree)	‘palo flojo (Albizia inundata or Enterolobium contortisiliquum)’	
*wijeʔ	‘cactus (Bromelia serra)’	
*wósitseχ (fruit); *wósits-uˀk, *wósits(e)-ku-jʰ	‘Prosopis nigra’	
*xélå(ˀ)X₁₂ (fruit), *xélå-juˀk (tree)	‘plant sp.’	
*xunxátaχ (fruit); *xunxáta-(ju)ˀk (tree)	‘tusca (Acacia aroma)’	
*xunxáta-kat (grove)	‘tusca (Acacia aroma)’	
*X₁₃óˀk	‘Bulnesia sarmientoi’	
*ʔaX₁₃ǻje(ˀ)χ (fruit); *ʔaX₁₃ǻj-uˀk, *ʔaX₁₃ǻj-ku-jʰ (tree)	‘mistol (Ziziphus mistol)’	
*ʔǻl(V)tse(ˀ)χ, *ʔǻl(V)tse-ts	‘cháguar (Bromelia urbaniana = Deinacanthon urbanianum)’	
*ʔǻnhajeχ (bean); *ʔǻnhaj-uˀk (plant); *ʔǻnhaje-ˀp (season)	‘Capparis retusa’	
*ʔåtits ~ *ʔåtíts ~ *ʔåtets ~ *ʔåtéts	‘wild pepper’	
*ɸinåk, *ɸinhå-jʰ	‘tobacco’	(MN)
*låttsiki-juˀk, *låttsiki-ku-jʰ	‘willow’	(MN)
*samto-ˀk	‘bamboo (Guadua angustifolia)’	(MN)
*tsaqaq ~ *-ä-	‘plant sp.’	(MN)
*(ˀ)wut	‘a bushy leguminous plant’	(MN)
*xoxaw-uˀk ?~ *xoxi-juˀk, *-ku-jʰ	‘Tabebuia nodosa tree’	(MN)
*ʔåthajeχ (fruit); *ʔåthaj-uˀk, *ʔåthaj-ku-jʰ (tree) (*-hä-)	‘molle plant’	(MN)
*ʔomhatäk (fruit); *ʔomhatä-(ju)ˀk, *ʔomhatä-ku-jʰ (tree) (~ *-hä-)	‘queen palm (Syagrus romanzoffiana)’	(MN)
*ɸálawuˀk	‘strangler vine (Morrenia odorata)’	(ChW)
*ɸílå(ˀ)X₁₂	‘Solanum sp.’	(ChW)
*ktéta(ʔ) ~ *ktä́ta(ʔ) (fruit); *ktéta-(ju)k ~ *ktä́ta-juk (tree)	‘Prosopis elata’	(ChW)
*kutsá(ˀ)X₁₂ ~ *kutsé(ˀ)χ ?~ *k’utsá(ˀ)X₁₂ ~ *k’utsé(ˀ)χ	‘cháguar (Bromelia hieronymi)’	(ChW)
*stá(ˀ)X (fruit); *stá-ˀq (plant)	‘Stetsonia coryne cactus’	(ChW)
*tsémɬå(ˀ)k ~ *tsä́mɬå(ˀ)k	‘silk floss tree’	(ChW)
*tsu(ˀ)X ?~*ts’u(ˀ)X (fruit); *tsuX-uk ?~ *ts’uX-uk (tree)	‘sachamembrillo (Capparis tweediana)’	(ChW)
*ʔaté(ˀ)k ~ *ʔatä́(ˀ)k	‘cebil (Anadenanthera colubrina) or vinal (Prosopis ruscifolia)’	(ChW)

== Bibliography ==
- Adelaar, Willem F. H.; & Muysken, Pieter C. (2004). The languages of the Andes. Cambridge language surveys. Cambridge University Press.
- Campbell, Lyle. (1997). American Indian languages: The historical linguistics of Native America. New York: Oxford University Press. ISBN 0-19-509427-1.
- Fabre, Alain (2005). "Los Mataguayo". (Online version: http://www.ling.fi/Entradas%20diccionario/Dic=Mataguayo.pdf)
