= Maká language =

Matacoan language spoken in Paraguay

Maká
- Maká
- Pronunciation: [maˈka]
- Native to: Argentina, Paraguay
- Region: Presidente Hayes Department, Asunción
- Ethnicity: Maká people
- Native speakers: (1,500 cited 2000)
- Language family: Matacoan: Maká

Language codes
- ISO 639-3: mca
- Glottolog: maca1260
- ELP: Maká

Maká is a Matacoan language spoken in Argentina and Paraguay by the Maká people. Its 1,500 speakers live primarily in Presidente Hayes Department near the Río Negro, as well as in and around Asunción.

== Phonology ==
Consonants
		Labial	Dental	Alveolar	Palatal/ Velar	Uvular	Glottal
Nasal		m	n				
Plosive	plain	p	t	ts	k	q	ʔ
Plosive	ejective	pʼ	tʼ	tsʼ	kʼ	qʼ	
Fricative		f	ɬ	s	x	χ	h
Approximant		w	l		j		

Velar consonants alternate with palatal consonants before /e/ and sometimes before /a/. Examples include /keɬejkup/ ~ [ceɬejkup] 'autumn' and /exeʔ/ ~ [eçeʔ] 'stork'. The palatal approximant /j/ is realised as a palatal fricative [ç] before /i/, as in /inanjiʔ/ ~ [inançiʔ].

Vowels
	Front	Back
High	i	u
Mid	e	o
Low	a	

Syllables in Maká may be of types V, VC, CV, CCV, and CCVC. When a consonant cluster appears at the beginning of a syllable, the second consonant must be /x/, /h/, /w/, or /j/.

== Morphology ==
=== Nouns ===
==== Gender ====
Maká has two genders—masculine and feminine. The demonstratives reflect the gender of a noun.

Masculine nouns	Feminine nouns
na’ sehe’ DEM.MASC land 'this land'	ne’ naxkax DEM.FEM tree 'this tree'
na’ nunax DEM.MASC dog 'this (male) dog'	ne’ nunax DEM.FEM dog 'this (female) dog'

In the plural the gender distinction is neutralized, and the plural demonstrative is the same as the feminine singular:

ne’ sehe-l
these land-PL
‘these lands’

ne’ naxkak-wi
these tree-PL
‘these trees’

==== Number ====
Maká nouns inflect for plurality. There are several distinct plural endings: -l, -wi, -Vts, and -Vy. All plants take the -wi plural, but otherwise the choice seems to be unpredictable.

singular	plural	gloss
sehe	sehe-l	'land(s)'
naxkax	naxkax-wi	'tree(s)'
tenuk	tenuk-its	'cat(s)'

==== Case ====
Maká does not have any overt case marking on nouns. Consider the following sentence, where neither the subject nor object shows any case.

Ne’ efu Ø-tux ka’ sehets.
DEM.F woman A.3-eat INDEF.M fish
‘The woman eats fish.’

==== Agreement with the possessor ====
Nouns agree with their possessor in person.

y-exi’ 1S-mouth 'my mouth'	Ø-exi’ 2-mouth 'your mouth'	ł-exi’ 3-mouth 'his/her/their mouth'	in-exi’ 1PL.INCL-mouth 'our (inclusive) mouth'

=== Verbs ===
==== Agreement with subject and object ====
Verbs agree with their subject and object in a rather complex system. Gerzenstein (1995) identifies five conjugation classes for intransitive verbs. The following two examples show intransitive verbs from conjugation classes 1 and 3.

	tremble (conjugation class 3)		dance (conjugation class 1)	
1	tsi-kawelik	'I tremble'	hoy-otoy	'I dance'
2	łan-kawelik	'you tremble'	ł-otoy	'you dance'
3	yi-kawelik	'he/she trembles'	t-otoy	'he/she dances'
1pl.incl	xiyi-kawelik	'we (inclusive) tremble'	xit-otoy	'we (inclusive) dance'

Transitive verbs belong to a different conjugation class, Conjugation 6. The following forms show a transitive verb with a 3rd person object:

love (conjugation class 6)
hi-su'un	'I love (him/her)'
łi-su'un	'you love (him/her)'
yi-su'un	'he/she loves (him/her)'
xite-su'un	'we (inclusive) love (him/her)'

If the object of the transitive verb is 1st or 2nd person, then certain combinations of subject and object are shown by a portmanteau morpheme.

love (conjugation class 6)		subject/object combination
k'e-su'un	'I love you'	1SUBJ›2OBJ
tsi-su'un	'he/she loves me'	3SUBJ›1OBJ
ne-su'un	'he/she loves you'	3SUBJ›2OBJ

Other combinations involve an object agreement marker which may either precede or follow the subject marker.

łe-ts-ikfex
2.SUBJ-1SG.OBJ-bite
'you bite me'

xi-yi-łin
1PL.INCL.OBJ-3-save
'he/she saves us (inclusive)'

==== Applicatives ====
Verbs in Maká have a series of suffixes called 'postpositions' in Gerzenstein (1995), which have the effect of introducing new oblique objects into the sentence.

The following examples show the applicative suffixes -ex 'instrumental ('with')' and -m 'benefactive ('for')'

Ne’ efu ni-xele-ex ke’ ute na’ nunax.
DEM.F woman A.3-throw-with INDEF.M rock DEM.M dog
‘The woman threw a rock at the dog.’

H-osxey-i-m na’ sehets na’ k’utsaX
A.1-grill-P.3-for DEM.M fish DEM.M old.man
‘I grill fish for the old man.’

== Syntax ==
=== Noun phrases ===
In noun phrases, the possessor precedes the possessed noun.

e-li-ts łe-xiła’
2-child-PL 3-head
'your children’s head'

Noun phrases show the order (Demonstrative) (Numeral) (Adjective) N.

Ne’ efu t-aqhay-ets ne’ ikwetxuł fo’ tiptip-its
DEM.F woman S.3-buy-toward DEM.PL four white horse-PL
’The woman bought four white horses.’

=== Sentences ===
==== Affirmative ====
The basic word order for a transitive clause in Maká is subject–verb–object, as seen in the following example.

Ne’ efu ni-xele-ex ke’ ute na’ nunax.
DEM.F woman A.3-throw-with INDEF.M rock DEM.M dog
‘The woman threw a rock at the dog.’

For intransitive clauses, the basic order is verb-subject.

Wapi ne' efu.
rest DEM.F woman
'The woman rests'

==== Interrogative ====
In yes–no questions, the usual subject–verb–object order changes to verb-subject-object following an initial particle me.

Me y-eqfemet-en na' k’utsaX na' xukhew?
Q A.3-injure-CAUS DEM.M old.man DEM.M man
‘Did the old man injure the man?’

Sentences with wh-questions show a sentence-initial question word. Maká has a very small inventory of question words, with only three members: łek 'who, what', pan 'which, where, how many', and inhats'ek 'why'. The following example shows an interrogative sentence with an initial question word.

Łek pa' tux na' xukhew?
what DEM.M eat DEM.M old.man
‘What did the old man eat?’
