= Mbayá =

Indigenous people of South America

The Mbayá or Mbyá are an Indigenous people of South America which formerly ranged on both sides of the Paraguay River, on the north and northwestern Paraguay frontier, eastern Bolivia, and in the adjacent province of Mato Grosso do Sul, Brazil. They have also been called Caduveo. In the 16th century the Mbayá were called Guaycuru, a name later used generically for all the nomadic and semi-nomadic Indigenous peoples of the Gran Chaco. The Kadiwéu people of Brazil are the surviving branch of the Mbayá.

The Mbayá called themselves the Eyiguayegis 'people of the palm', a reference to the abundant palm trees in their home country. (The name Eyiguayegis is similar to that of Agaces or aigeis, a name more often applied to the related Payaguá. Possibly the two peoples were nearly the same in the 16th century.) The Mbayá spoke a Guaycuruan language. They were "formidable" fighters and "kept the Europeans – settlers and priests alike – at bay" for more than 300 years.

The Mbayá were nomads. With horses captured from the Spanish, the Mbayá developed an equestrian culture by about 1600 and were a serious threat to Spanish and Portuguese settlers, missionaries, and governments in Paraguay, Bolivia, and Brazil until near the late 19th century. They also raided and subjugated other Indigenous groups, notably the Guana. They were generally friendly with the Payaguá, who lived along the Paraguay River and had a riverine culture.

== History ==
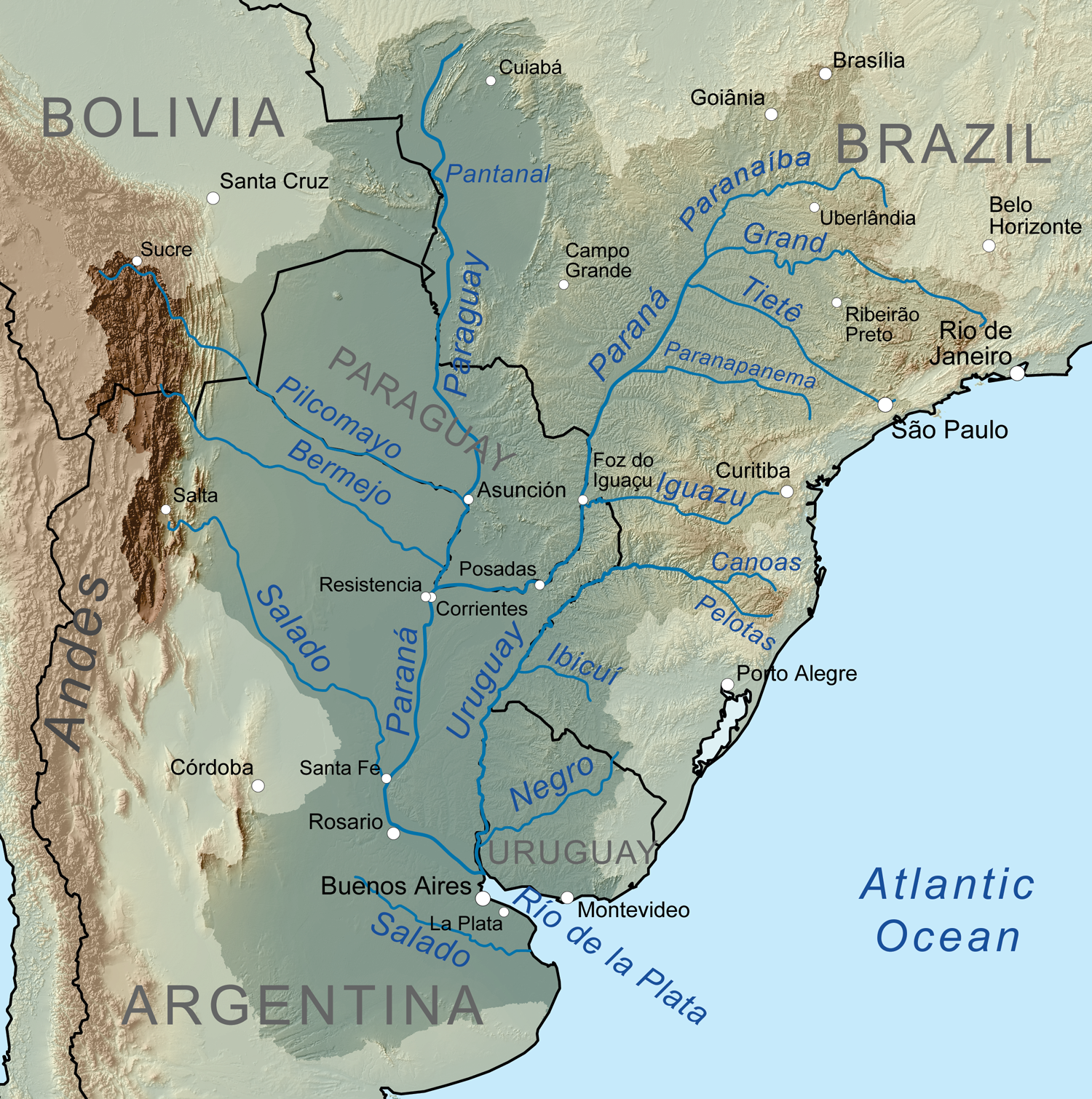
The Mbayá lived west of the Paraguay River and north of the Pilcomayo River in the Gran Chaco.

The terms Mbayá and Guaycuru were synonymous to the early Spanish colonists. Guaycuru came to be the collective name applied to all the ethnic groups speaking similar languages, called Guaycuruan, while the name Mbayá referred more narrowly to several loosely-organized bands of the northern Gran Chaco. In the 18th century, the Spanish believed that the Mbayá numbered seven to eight thousand people.

When first in contact with Spanish explorers in the early decades of the 16th century, the Mbayá lived north of the Pilcomayo River on the western side of the Paraguay River. In 1542, the Spanish Governor of Paraguay Álvar Núñez Cabeza de Vaca with Guarani allies launched a large military operation against the Mbayá northeast of Asunción. The Myabá had been raiding the sedentary Guarani peoples and the Spanish agreed to help protect them. The expedition was a success, but helped create the enduring animosity between the Mbayá and Spanish. Over the next century, the Mbayá acquired by theft or trade horses and iron tools and weapons from the Spanish and became more threatening, especially to the Guarani who lived eastward from the Paraguay River. In 1661, some of the Mbayá migrated east of the river, destroyed a Jesuit mission, also called a reduction, and displaced the Guarani in the old region of Itatín, located southwest of the present day city of Campo Grande, Brazil.

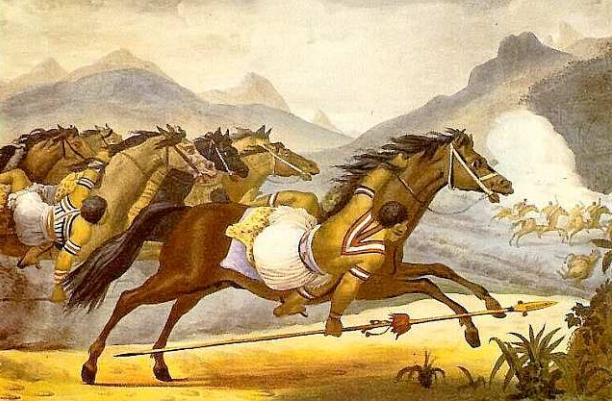
Guaycuru (probably Mbayá) at war in Brazil in the early 19th century.

The Mbayá and other Guaycuruan groups developed a horse culture, similar in many respects to that of the Indigenous peoples of the Great Plains of North America. They both raided and traded with the Spanish, often making peace with one town or region while attacking another. From 1651 to 1756, the Mbayá were a severe threat to the Spanish in Paraguay, the eastern and southern bands making an uneasy peace with the Spanish in the latter year. The first moderately successful Roman Catholic mission among the Mbayá was established in 1760 east of the city of Concepción, Paraguay, thus beginning a process of absorbing them into the population of Paraguay.

However, the Mbayá were never politically united. While some made peace with the Paraguayans, in the northern Chaco the Mbayá bands contested Spanish authorities and Jesuits expanding out of Santa Cruz de la Sierra, Bolivia. The Santo Corazon mission, established in 1760, was the most easterly of the Bolivian missions and initially had a population of 2,287 Chiquitos people. The mission had the political objective of finding and securing a land route from Spanish settlements in Bolivia to those in Paraguay. After a military expedition organized by the Jesuits against the Mbayás initiated hostilities, the Mbayá killed a Jesuit priest and many Chiquitos in 1763. The response of the Jesuits was to capture by subterfuge 500 Mbayá warriors and disperse them to other missions. For the next 30 years, until 1793, the Mbayá menaced the Santo Corazon area, reduced the settlement to impotence, and retained effective control of the Bolivian Chaco. Not until the 1870s was a road fashioned across the northern Chaco from Santa Cruz to Corumbá Brazil.

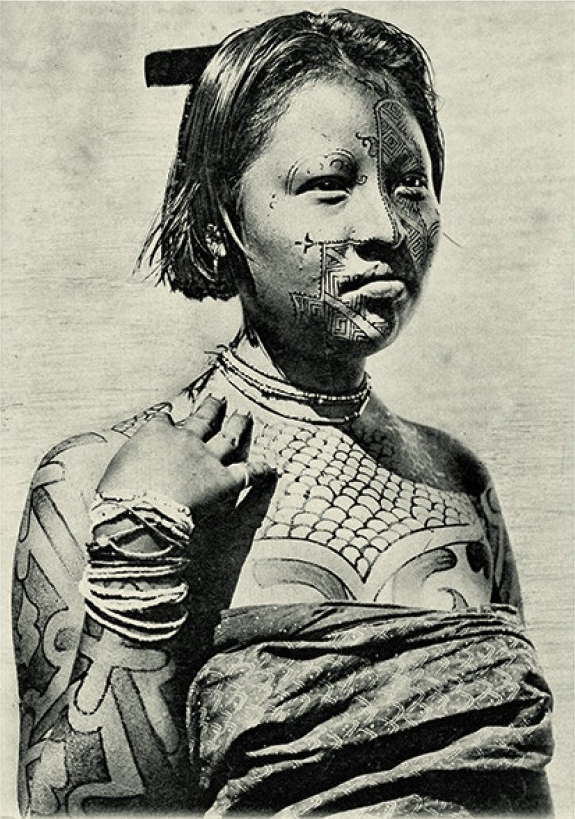
Kadiwéu girl in Brazil about 1892.

Located on the frontier between Portuguese Brazil and Spanish Paraguay, the Mbayá also raided the Portuguese, although they made peace with them in 1791. Ranchers in Paraguay in 1796 killed 300 Indigenous peoples, including eleven Mbayá chiefs, thus breaking the long-standing peace agreement between Mbayá and Paraguayans. The Mbayá responded by raiding settlements and aiding the Portuguese in their conflicts with the Spanish and the Paraguayans. By 1800, most of the Mbayá had moved east of the Paraguay River to Mato Grosso do Sul province, Brazil. The Portuguese and the newly independent Brazilians provided them with arms and ammunition and bought the cattle and horses they stole from Paraguayan ranches. By the 1840s, however, the Brazilians were trying to force the Mbayá to live in permanent settlements, but with little success.

In the Paraguayan War (1864-1870), the Mbayá, especially the Kadiweu band, fought on the Brazilian side. They were both praised for bravery and condemned for a "limitless ardor for plunder" by Brazilian officers. They suffered heavy casualties from battle and disease. One Brazilian general said that Brazil owed its continued control of the southern Mato Grosso to the Mbayá.

During and after the war, a smallpox epidemic decimated their population and with the influx of large numbers of Brazilian settlers, the Mbayá lost their lands and became laborers and ranch hands. In 1870 some of the Kadiwéu band of the Mbayá moved to Argentina where their descendants number 1,000. The Kadiweu or Caduveo band also survives in Brazil. As a reward for their military service, in 1903 the Brazilian government granted them an expanse of territory in Mato Grosso do Sul where about 1,400 of them live.

== The Guaná ==
The Guaná, (also called Chané and Layaná), speakers of an Arawak language, were vassals of the Mbayá, a relationship that, according to Spanish accounts, existed in 1548, and possibly much earlier. The Guaná were agricultural and pedestrian as opposed to the nomadic Mbayá who became equestrians by the early 17th century. In the early 18th century the Guaná lived in seven large villages of 1,000 or more people on the western side of the Paraguay River between 19 and 22 south latitudes. Later in the 18th century, some of them migrated along with the Mbayá east of the Paraguay River. They were estimated, perhaps generously, in the early 18th century to have numbered 18,000 to 30,000. In 1793 they numbered about 8,200.

The Guaná provided Mbayá chiefs with labor, agricultural products, textiles, and wives and in exchange were given protection and European goods such as iron tools by the Mbayá. The cultures of the Guaná and Mbayá slowly became more similar as the Mbayá adopted agriculture and weaving and the Guaná became equestrian. The Mbayá augmented their numbers, strictly limited by late marriages and abortion, by intermarriage with Guaná and captive women of other ethnic groups. Spanish chroniclers describe the Guaná as docile. The Mbayá, arrogant and ethnocentric, were described by Spanish chroniclers as surprisingly benign and respectful in dealing with their Guaná subjects.

== See also ==
- Paraguayan Indigenous art
