= Nivaclé language =

Matacoan language spoken in Argentina and Paraguay

Nivaclé
- Niwaklé
- nivaĉle
- Pronunciation: [niβaˈq͡le]
- Native to: Argentina, Paraguay
- Ethnicity: Nivaclé
- Native speakers: 14,000 (2007)
- Language family: Matacoan: Nivaclé

Language codes
- ISO 639-3: cag
- Glottolog: niva1238
- ELP: Nivaclé

Nivaclé (Nivaclé pronunciation: [niβaˈq͡le]) is a Matacoan language spoken in Paraguay and in Argentina by the Nivaclé. It is also known as Chulupí and Ashluslay, and in older sources has been called Ashluslé, Suhin, Sujín, Chunupí, Churupí, Choropí, and other variant spellings of these names. Nivaclé speakers are found in the Chaco, in Paraguay in Presidente Hayes Department, and Boquerón Department, and in Argentina in Salta Province.

Nivaclé is complex both in its phonology and morphology. Much of what is handled in syntactic constructions in many other languages is signalled in Nivaclé by its rich bound morphology and clitics. Nivaclé has several linguistic traits that are rare elsewhere in the world or even unique.

== Phonology ==
Its phonemic inventory has 21 consonants and six vowel qualities, including glottalized (ejective) stops and affricates, and a unique phoneme, /k͡l/.

Vowels
	Front	Back
Close	i iː	u uː
Close-mid	e eː	o oː
Open	a aː	ɑ ɑː

Consonants
		Bilabial	Alveolar	Palatal	Velar	Glottal
Nasal		m	n			
Stop	plain	p	t		k	ʔ
Stop	ejective	pʼ	tʼ		kʼ	ʔ
Affricate	plain		t͡s	t͡ʃ		
Affricate	ejective		t͡sʼ	t͡ʃʼ		
Fricative		ɸ	s	ʃ	x	
Approximant			ɫ̥	j	w	
Occluded lateral			k͡l			

Even within single syllables the Nivaclé consonant cluster /t/ + /ʃ/ (orthographic ⟨tsh⟩) contrasts with the alveopalatal affricate /t͡ʃ/ (orthographic ⟨ch⟩); whereas the cluster /t/ + /s/ contrasts with the alveolar affricate /t͡s/, both across morpheme boundaries and within single morphemes – this is unusual cross-linguistically.

== Morphology ==
=== Word order ===
The basic word order (constituent order) is SVO (Subject-Verb-Object), or, in the different formulation used by some, AVO (A = subject of transitive verb or ‘agent’, V = verb, O = object of transitive verb), though other orders are possible in less neutral contexts. It also has the basic orders GN (Genitive-Noun, that is, possessor-possessed), NA (Noun-Adjective), and NP-Rel (Head Noun-Relative Clause). It has few adpositions (prepositions or postpositions); rather these relational and locative functions are signaled by a rich set of suffixes and clitics attached primarily to verbs, but also to other parts of speech; it also has some relational nouns (possessed noun constructions that function as adpositions). The co-occurrence in a language of the orders SVO, NA, GN, and NP-Rel is somewhat unusual for a language with SVO basic word order typology, where NG (Noun + Genitive) would be the expected order, rather than Nivaclé’s GN. SVO languages also tend to have Preposition-Noun order, too, though prepositions are mostly lacking in this language.

=== Nouns ===
The main lexical categories (parts of speech) of Nivaclé are noun, pronoun, demonstrative, adjective, adverb, and verb. There are significant syntactic and morphological differences in the behavior of several of these lexical categories which distinguish them from similar categories in well-known European languages. Clitics are frequent in this language.

There is a masculine-feminine gender contrast in nouns, semantically determined for some nouns that refer to humans and certain animals, but otherwise arbitrary for most other nouns. However, the nouns themselves, in spite of their gender, generally bear no overt indication of gender assignment. This is signaled rather in the demonstratives which accompany the nouns and which agree with the gender of the noun. Also the plural markers that nouns bear differ depending on whether the noun is masculine or feminine. There are several different plural markers, a complex system.

The demonstrative (deictic) system is also complex, with numerous demonstratives which are distinguished according to several semantic traits, sensitive to whether the referent is visible or not, was witnessed previously by the speaker, is known only from reports or hearsay, or no longer exists. As mentioned, these contrasting semantic traits of the demonstratives play a role in inferring the tense of an utterance. For example, if a referent is visible, then by inference it is present, in present time; if it was witnessed earlier but is not currently visible, then typically by inference it is past.

Evidentiality is also inferred from the semantic traits of the demonstratives. For example, if a speaker uses a ‘visible’ demonstrative, by inference this also indicates that he/she vouches for the truth value of the statement, for the reality of the entity modified by this demonstrative, because the speaker knows it from witnessing it. If, on the other hand, a demonstrative that indicates ‘known only by report or hearsay’ is employed, by inference this part of the utterance has the evidential sense that the speaker does not affirm the truth of what is said, but rather only reports it as something told by others and not known from personal experience. Evidentiality from demonstratives interacts with other discourse evidential markers, one word for things reported but not known and another for expressing doubt, uncertainty about the truth of an utterance. This carries over to multi-clause utterances, where subordinate clauses can contrast with regard to the conjunction that introduces them and in terms of the subject agreement markers they can take, where some are treated as real (events known to have happened or to be going to happen) and others are irrealis (things that have not happened but are hypothetical or doubtful).

=== Verbs ===
Verbs in Nivaclé are very complex and can bear many different affixes and clitics. Nevertheless, there are no direct grammatical markers on verbs nor elsewhere in the grammar for tense or aspect. The senses of tense are conveyed by the demonstratives whose semantic contrasts give temporal inferences. Nivaclé is, thus, one of the few languages of the world which have nominal tense with no verbal tense marking.

The verb alignment is active-stative – there are two series of pronominal affixes on verbs, one that indicates subjects of active verbs which report events or happenings, whether they are transitive or intransitive, and another which signals both the object of transitive verbs and also the subject of stative intransitive verbs, verbs which refer to states and not to events or happenings, as the active verbs do. Indicative, negative, and irrealis verbs have distinct morphological markings of their own for personal pronoun subject agreement. There is also distinct morphology signaling verbs of subordinate clauses.

Nivaclé distinguishes first person plural inclusive (‘we all’, ‘our [our (all)]’) and exclusive (‘we’ [I/we and others, but not including you], ‘ours’ [but not including yours]) in pronouns, in possessive morphology and in verbs.

Nivaclé has a very rich system of directional affixes and clitics, marked primarily on the verbs, sometimes on other parts of speech. As mentioned, Nivaclé generally lacks adpositions (prepositions and postpositions), as the directional affixes and clitics fulfill the roles played by adpositions in other languages. The language has a genitive noun classifier for possessed domestic animals and another for possessed prey (hunted animals). For example, it is not possible to say directly the equivalent of my horse, but rather it is necessary to say the equivalent of my-domestic.animal.classifier horse.
