= Guaicuruan languages =

Language family of South America

Guaicuruan
- Waikurúan
- Geographic distribution: northern Argentina, western Paraguay, southern Brazil
- Ethnicity: Guaycuru peoples
- Linguistic classification: Mataco–Guaicuru ?: Guaicuruan
- Subdivisions: Kadiweu; Southern

Language codes
- Glottolog: guai1249

Guaicuruan (Guaykuruan, Waikurúan, Guaycuruano, Guaikurú, Guaicuru, Guaycuruana) is a language family spoken in northern Argentina, western Paraguay, and Brazil (Mato Grosso do Sul). The speakers of the languages are often collectively called the Guaycuru peoples. For the most part, the Guaycuruans lived in the Gran Chaco and were nomadic and warlike, until finally subdued by the various countries of the region in the 19th century.

== Genetic relations ==
Jorge A. Suárez includes Guaicuruan with Charruan in a hypothetical Waikuru-Charrúa stock. Morris Swadesh includes Guaicuruan along with Matacoan, Charruan, and Mascoian within his Macro-Mapuche stock. Both proposals appear to be obsolete.

== Family division ==
There is a clear binary split between Northern Guaicuruan (Kadiwéu) and Southern Guaicuruan according to Nikulin (2019). Guaicuruan/Waikurúan languages are often classified as follows:

- Guaicuruan
  - Northern Guaicuruan
    - Kadiweu (also known as Caduveo, Kadiwéu, Mbayá-Guaycuru, Mbayá, Guaicurú, Waikurú, Ediu-Adig)
  - Southern Guaicuruan
    - Pilagá (also known as Pilacá)
    - Toba Qom (also known as Chaco Sur, Namqom)
    - Mocoví (also known as Mbocobí, Mokoví, Moqoyt)
    - †Abipón (also known as Callaga, Kalyaga, Abipon)

Abipón is extinct.

Harriet Klein argues against the assumption that Kadiweu is Guaicuruan. Most others accept the inclusion of Kadiweu into the family. The Guachi were absorbed by the Mbayá. The similarities with the Mbayá language may be due to borrowing rather than a familial relationship.

- Toba is spoken in the eastern part of the Chaco and Formosa provinces of Argentina, in southern Paraguay, and in the eastern part of Bolivia; there are approximately 25,000 speakers. The Guaicuruan Toba language here should not be confused with the Mascoy language of the Mascoyan family which is also called Toba (or Toba-Emok, Toba-Maskoy).
- Pilagá, with about 4,000 speakers, is spoken in the northeastern part of Chaco province, and in eastern Formosa, Argentina;
- Mocoví, with about 7,000 speakers, is spoken in Argentina in the northern part of Santa Fe and southern Chaco provinces.
- Abipón, which was spoken in the eastern part of Chaco province, Argentina, is now extinct and was very closely related to the other languages in the southern branch

=== Mason (1950) ===
Internal classification of the Guaicuruan languages by Mason (1950):

- Guaicuruan
  - Guaicurú, Northern: Mbayá-Guaicurú
    - West: Caduveo (Cadiguegodí), Guetiadegodí (Guetiadebo)
    - East: Apacachodegodegí (Mbayá Mirim), Lichagotegodí (Icachodeguo ?), Eyibogodegí, Gotocogegodegí (Ocoteguebo ?)
    - Payaguá (Lengua)
      - North: Sarigué (Cadigué)
      - South: Magach (Agacé, Siacuás, Tacumbú)
  - Frentones
    - Middle: Toba (Tocowit)
      - Toba: Guazú, Komlék, Michi (Miri), Cocolot, Lanyagachek, Mogosma, Chirokina, Natica
      - Pilagá
      - Aguilot
    - South
      - Abipón (Callaga)
        - Mapenuss (Yaukanigá)
        - Mepene
        - Gulgaissen (Kilvasa)
      - Mocoví (Mbocobí)

Possible or doubtful Guaicuruan languages listed by Mason (1950):

- Guachi
- Layaná
- Juri (Suri)
- Querandí
- Mahoma (Hohoma)

== Bibliography ==
- Adelaar, Willem F. H.; & Muysken, Pieter C. (2004). The languages of the Andes. Cambridge language surveys. Cambridge University Press.
- Campbell, Lyle. (1997). American Indian languages: The historical linguistics of Native America. New York: Oxford University Press. ISBN 0-19-509427-1.
- Censabella, Marisa. (1999). Las lenguas indígenas de la Argentina. (pp 60–77). Buenos Aires: Editorial Universitaria de Buenos Aires. ISBN 950-23-0956-1.
