= List of contemporary ethnic groups of South America =

List of South American ethnic groups

The following is a list of contemporary ethnic groups of South America. There has been constant debate over the classification of ethnic groups. Membership of an ethnic group tends to be associated with shared ancestry, history, homeland, language or dialect and cultural heritage; where the term "culture" specifically includes aspects such as religion, mythology and ritual, cuisine, dressing (clothing) style and other factors.

By the nature of the concept, ethnic groups tend to be divided into subgroups, may themselves be or not be identified as independent ethnic groups depending on the source consulted.

South America here is considered to be approximately delimited from Africa by the South Atlantic Ocean; from North America by the Darién Gap and the portion of the Caribbean Sea south of Aruba, Bonaire, Curaçao, Nueva Esparta, Providencia, San Andrés, Trinidad, and Tobago; and from Oceania by the East Pacific Rise connecting the Pacific and Nazca Plates as well as by its intersection with the Chile Ridge at the Juan Fernández Microplate.

== Ethnic groups ==
The following groups are commonly identified as "ethnic groups", as opposed to ethno-linguistic phyla, national groups, racial groups or similar.

Ethnicity	Language(s)	Primary homeland	Subgroups, tribes & castes	Religion(s)
Abipón	Historically Guaicuruan → Southern Guaicuruan → Abipón	Paraguay		Native American religion
Achagua	Arawakan → Upper Amazon Arawakan → Achagua	Colombia (Meta), Venezuela		Traditional religion, Christianity → Catholicism
Aché	Tupian → Tupi–Guarani → Aché	Paraguay		Native American religion
Achuar	Chicham → Nuclear Chicham → Achuar–Shiwiar → Achuar	Peru (Peruvian Amazonia), Ecuador (Oriente)	Huasaga	Christianity, Shamanism, Animism
Afro-Argentines	Indo-European → Romance → Spanish → Rioplatense Spanish	Argentina		Christianity → Catholicism
Afro-Brazilians	Indo-European → Romance → Portuguese → Brazilian Portuguese, Cafundó	Brazil	Quilombos	Christianity → Catholicism
Afro-Bolivians	Indo-European → Romance → Spanish → Bolivian Spanish	Bolivia (Bolivian Yungas)		Christianity → Catholicism
Afro-Chileans	Indo-European → Romance → Spanish → Chilean Spanish	Chile (Arica y Parinacota Region, Tarapacá Region and Santiago Metropolitan Region)		Christianity → Catholicism
Afro-Colombians	Indo-European → Romance → Spanish → Colombian Spanish; Indo-European → Spanish-based creole → Palenquero; Indo-European → English-based creole → San Andres-Providencia Creole	Colombia (Pacific region, Caribbean region)	Palenques	Christianity → Catholicism
Afro-Ecuadorians	Indo-European → Romance → Spanish → Ecuadorian Spanish	Ecuador (Esmeraldas Province, Guayaquil, Valle del Chota, Imbabura Province Sucumbíos Province)		Christianity → Catholicism
Afro-French Guianans	Indo-European → Romance → French; Indo-European → French → French Guianese Creole	France (French Guiana)		Christianity
Afro-Guyanese	Indo-European → English → Guyanese Creole	Guyana		Christianity → Catholicism, Protestantism → Anglicanism, Methodism, Calvinism, Baptist, etc Afro-American religions, Traditional African religions, Islam, Rastafari, Comfa
Afro-Paraguayans	Indo-European → Romance → Spanish → Paraguayan Spanish	Paraguay (Central Department, Paraguari Department and Cordillera Department)		Christianity → Catholicism
Afro-Peruvians	Indo-European → Romance → Spanish → Peruvian Spanish	Peru (Lima, Piura, Lambayeque, Tumbes and Ica)		Christianity → Catholicism, Protestantism; Buddhism; Animism, etc
Afro-Surinamese	Indo-European → Germanic → Dutch → Surinamese Dutch; Indo-European → English → Sranan Tongo, Aukan, Kwinti; Indo-European → English and Portuguese → Saramaccan	Suriname		Christianity, Winti
Afro-Uruguayans	Indo-European → Romance → Spanish → Uruguayan Spanish; Indo-European → Romance → Spanish and Portuguese → Portuñol	Uruguay		Christianity → Catholicism, Protestantism; etc
Afro-Venezuelans	Indo-European → Romance → Spanish → Venezuelan Spanish	Venezuela (Venezuelan Caribbean and Barlovento)		Christianity → Catholicism, Protestantism; Birongo; Cult to María Lionza
Aguaruna	Chicham → Aguaruna	Peru (Peruvian Amazonia)	Yutupiza, Japaime	Christianity, Shamanism, Animism
Aikana	Aikana language	Brazil (Rondonia)	Tubarão-Latundê, Vilhena	Animism
Akawaio	Cariban → Kapóng	Venezuela, Brazil, Guyana		Animism
Apanyekra	Macro-Je → Je → Canela	Brazil (Northeast Region)		Ethnic religion
Apinajé	Macro-Je → Je → Apinayé	Brazil (Tocantins)		Animism
Apurinã	Arawakan → Piro → Apurinã	Brazil (Amazonas, Mato Grosso, Rondônia)		Animism
Arhuaco	Chibchan → Arhuaco	Colombia (Sierra Nevada de Santa Marta)		Animism
Asháninka	Arawakan → Pre-Andine → Asháninka	Peru (Junín, Pasco, Huanuco, Ucayali), Brazil (Acre)		Animism
Atacama	Kunza	Chile (Atacama Desert, Altiplano), Argentina (Altiplano), Bolivia (Antofagasta Region)		Inca Religion
Awa	Barbacoan → Awan → Awa	Colombia (Narino), Ecuador (Carchi)		Christianity
Aymara	Aymaran → Aymara	Bolivia, Peru, Chile		Christianity → Catholicism
Ayoreo	Zamucoan → Ayoreo	Paraguay, Bolivia	Totobiegosode, Garaigosode, Tacheigosode, Direquedéjnaigosode, Guidaigosode, Ducodegosode, Tiegosode	Christianity, Shamanism
Baniwa	Arawakan → Upper Amazon Arawakan → Karu	Brazil (Amazonas), Colombia (Amazonas), Venezuela (Amazonas)		Traditional religion; Christianity → Catholicism
Boeroes	Indo-European → Germanic → Dutch → Surinaams	Suriname		Christianity
Bororo	Macro-Je → Bororoan → Bororo	Brazil (Mato Grosso)		Animism
Cabiyari	Arawakan → Upper Amazon Arawakan → Cabiyari	Colombia (Vaupes)		Christianity
Caquetio	Arawakan → Ta-Arawakan → Caquetio	Venezuela (Falcón, Zulia), formerly Aruba, Curaçao, Bonaire (Netherlands)		Native American religion
Chachi (Note: Otherwise known as Cayapas.)	Barbacoan → Chaʼpalaa	Ecuador (Esmeraldas)		Christianity → Catholicism, Native American religion
Caribs	Cariban → Carib	Venezuela, Suriname, Guyana, French Guiana, Brazil		Animism
Chamacoco	Zamucoan → Chamacoco	Paraguay, Brazil (Mato Grosso do Sul)	Ebytoso, Tomáraho	Christianity, Indigenous religion
Charrúa	Charruan languages (Note: Language family; with some exceptions, all speakers of the various languages within this family are typically seen as one singular ethnicity.)	Uruguay	Chaná	Animism
Chiquitano	Macro-Jê(?) → Chiquitano	Bolivia (Santa Cruz), Brazil (Mato Grosso)	Tao, Miñoco, Manasi	Christianity → Catholicism; Traditional Religion
Cinta Larga	Tupian → Monde → Cinta Larga	Brazil (Amazon rainforest)		Indigenous religion, Santo Daime
Cofan	Cofan language	Ecuador (Sucumbios), Colombia (Putumayo)		Animism
Comechingon	Comechingon	Argentina (Cordoba, San Luis)		Christianity → Catholicism
Confederados	Indo-European → Germanic → English → Southern American English; Indo-European → Romance → Portuguese → Brazilian Portuguese	Brazil (Americana, Santa Bárbara d'Oeste)		Christianity → Protestantism, Irreligion
Diaguita	Cacán	Chile (Norte Chico), Argentina (La Rioja, Catamarca)		Christianity → Catholicism, Shamanism
Embera	Choco → Embera	Colombia (Choco Department), Panama (Darien, Embera)		Shamanism
Enxet	Mascoian → Enxet, Enlhet	Paraguay (Gran Chaco)	Sawhoyamaxa	Animism
Ese Ejja	Tacanan → Ese Ejja	Bolivia (Beni, La Paz, Pando), Peru (Madre de Dios)		Christianity → Catholicism; Traditional Religion
Falkland Islanders	Indo-European → Germanic → English → Falkland Islands English	British Overseas Territories (Falkland Islands)		Christianity
Gavião (Jê)	Macro-Jê → Je → Pará Gavião → Parkatêjê, Pykobjê	Brazil (Pará, Maranhão)	Parkatêjê, Pykobjê	Animism
Gavião (Rondônia)	Tupian → Monde → Gavião of Jiparaná	Brazil (Rondonia)		Animism
Guajajara	Tupian → Tenetehara	Brazil (Maranhão)		Shamanism, Santo Daime
Guarani	Tupian → Guarani	Paraguay, Argentina (Misiones), Bolivia	Chiriguanos, Mbyá	Christianity → Catholicism
Guarayos	Tupian → Tupi-Guarani → Guarayu-Sirionó → Guarayo	Bolivia (Santa Cruz department), Paraguay (Boquerón department)		Traditional religion, Christianity → Catholicism
Hispanic Americans	Indo-European → Romance → Spanish → American Spanish	Hispanic South America (Colombia, Argentina, Peru, Venezuela, Chile, Ecuador, Bolivia, Paraguay, Uruguay)	Colombian (Cundinamarqués, Bogotan, Boyacense, Santandereano, Huilense, Tolimense, Paisa, Caucano, Pastuso, Valluno, Llanero, Amazonian Colombian, Guajiro, Sabanero, Samario, Vallenato, Chochoano, Tumaqueño, Basque-Colombian, Colombian-American), Argentinian (North Argentinian, Guaranitic, Cuyano, Cordobes, Puntano, Litoraleno, Porteno, Patagonian, Basque-Argentinian, Argentinian-American), Peruvian (Ecuatorial Peruvian, Coastal Peruvian, Andean Peruvian, Amazonian Peruvian, Peruvian-American), Hispanic Venezuelans (Amazonian Venezuelans, Llaneros, Andean Venezuelans, Western Venezuelans, Eastern Venezuelan, Island Venezuelans, Caraquenos, Zulianos, Central Venezuelans, Venezuelan-American, Venezuelan-Colombian), Chilean (Chilean-American), Ecuadorian (Quitenos, Riobambenos, Cuencanos, Lojano, Esmeraldeno, Manabita, Guayaco, Amazonian Ecuadorian, Galapagueños, Ecuadorian Americans), Bolivian (Bolivian-American), Paraguayan (Paraguayan-American), Uruguayans (including Uruguayan Americans), along with significant populations in the United States, Spain, France, Canada, Italy, Japan, Germany, United Kingdom, Portugal, Australia and Sweden	Christianity → Catholicism
Huambisa	Chicham → Huambisa	Peru (Peruvian Amazonia), Ecuador (Oriente)		Christianity, Shamanism, Animism
Huarpe	Huarpean	Argentina (Cuyo Region)	Millcayac, Allentiac	Animism
Hunsrikers	Indo-European → Germanic → Hunsrik	Brazil (Rio Grande do Sul, Santa Catarina)		Christianity → Catholicism, Protestantism
Indo-Caribbeans	Indo-European → Germanic → English → English Creole; Indo-European → Germanic → Dutch → Surinamese Dutch; Indo-European → Romance → Portuguese → Papiamento; Indo-European → Indo-Aryan → Hindustani → Caribbean Hindustani; Dravidian → Tamiloid → Tamil	Guyana, Suriname	Indo-Guyanese, Indo-Surinamese, with significant populations in the United States and the United Kingdom	Hinduism, Christianity, Islam, Sikhism, Jainism, Buddhism, Zoroastrianism, Baháʼí
Javanese Surinamese	Austronesian → Malayo-Polynesian → Javanese → Surinamese-Javanese; Indo-European → Germanic → Dutch, Sranan Tongo	Suriname		Islam → Sunni Islam; Christianity,Kejawèn
Kadiwéu	Guaicuruan → Kadiwéu	Brazil (Mato Grosso do Sul)		Christianity, Animism
Kaingang	Macro-Je → Je → Kaingang	Brazil (Paraná, Santa Catarina, Rio Grande do Sul, Sao Paulo)		Shamanism
Kamentsa	Camsa language	Colombia (Putumayo)		Christianity
Kawesqar	Alacalufan → Kawesqar	Chile (Chilean Patagonia, Wellington Island)		Christianity → Protestantism
Kaxinawá	Panoan → Kashinawa	Brazil (Acre)		Animism
Kayapo	Macro-Je → Je → Kayapo	Brazil (Pará, Mato Grosso)		Animism
Kiriri	Indo-European → Romance → Portuguese → Brazilian Portuguese; formerly Macro-Jê → Kariri	Brazil (Ceará)		Toré religion
Kraho	Macro-Je → Je → Kraho	Brazil (Terra Indigena Kraolandia)		Animism
Kulina	Arawan → Kulina	Peru, Brazil (Acre, Amazonas)		Shamanism
Kwinti	Indo-European → English Creole → Kwinti	Suriname		Christianity → Moravian Church
Luso-Brazilians	Indo-European → Romance → Portuguese → Brazilian Portuguese	Portuguese America (Brazil)	North Brazilians, Northeast Brazilians, Central-West Brazilians, Southeast Brazilians (includes Caipiras), Sertanejos, South Brazilians, along with significant populations in the United States, Portugal, Paraguay, United Kingdom, Japan, Italy, Spain, Germany, Canada, Argentina, France, Switzerland, French Guiana, Australia, Ireland, Mexico, Uruguay, Belgium, Bolivia, Netherlands, and Suriname	Christianity → Catholicism
Macushi	Cariban → Macushi	Guyana (Rupununi), Brazil (Roraima)		Shamanism
Mapuche	Araucanian languages (Note: Due to gradual Hispanicization following the Occupation of Araucania, the majority of Mapuche can only speak Spanish.)	Chile (Araucania), Argentina	Huilliche, Moluche, Pehuenche	Christianity, Mapuche religion
Matawai	Indo-European → Germanic → English → Saramaccan	Suriname		Christianity → Moravian Church
Mbaya	Mataco–Guaicuru languages → Guaicuruan languages → Kadiwéu	Gran Chaco		Animism
Mennonites	Indo-European → Germanic → German, Dutch; Romance → Spanish	South America	Significant populations in Argentina, Bolivia, Colombia, Paraguay, Peru, and Uruguay	Christianity → Anabaptism → Mennonitism
Misak	Barbacoan → Northern Barbacoan → Coconucan → Nam Trik	Colombia (Cauca)		Traditional religion, Christianity → Catholicism
Mocoví	Guaicuruan → Mocoví	Argentina (Gran Chaco)		Christianity, Animism
Muiscas	Chibchan → Chibcha	Colombia (Altiplano Cundiboyacense)		Muisca religion, Christianity → Catholicism
Mojeños	Arawakan → Southern → Bolivia-Parana → Moxo languages	Bolivia (Beni Department)	Mojeño-Trinitarios, Mojeño-Loretano, Mojeño-Javerianos, Mojeño-Ignacianos	Traditional religion, Christianity → Catholicism
Nikkei Brazilians	Indo-European → Romance → Portuguese	Brazil		Christianity → Roman Catholicism
Nivaclé	Matacoan → Nivaclé	Paraguay (President Hayes, Boquerón), Argentina (Salta), Bolivia (Tarija)	Chishamnee Lhavos, Shichaam Lhavos, Yita' Lhavos, Jotoi Lhavos, Tavashai Lhavos	Christianity, Animism
Páez	Páez	Colombia (Cauca Department)		Native American religion, Christianity → Catholicism
Pai Tavytera	Tupian → Guarani → Pai Tavytera	Paraguay (Amambay), Brazil (Mato Grosso do Sul)		Christianity, Animism
Palikur	Arawakan → Palikur	Brazil (Amapá), French Guiana		Animism
Parakanã	Tupian → Tupi-Guarani → Akwáwa → Parakanã	Brazil (Pará)	Western Parakanã, Eastern Parakanã	Shamanism
Paramaccan	Indo-European → Germanic → English → Ndyuka	Suriname (Pamacca)		Winti
Pardo	Indo-European → Romance → Portuguese	Brazil		Christianity → Catholicism
Pataxó	Macro-Jê → Maxakalian → Pataxó	Brazil (Bahia)		Shamanism
Payagua	Mataco–Guaicuru languages → Payagua	Paraguay (Gran Chaco)		Animism
Pemon	Cariban → Pemon	Venezuela, Brazil, Guyana		Animism
Piapoco	Arawakan → Upper Amazon Arawakan → Piapoco	Colombia (Meta), Venezuela		Traditional religion, Christianity → Catholicism
Piaroa	Piaroa	Venezuela		Animism
Pilagá	Guaicuruan → Pilagá	Argentina (Formosa)		Christianity, Animism
Potiguara	Tupian → Potiguara' Indo-European → Romance → Portuguese	Brazil (Paraíba)		Shamanism
Puelche	Chonan → Gününa Küne	Argentina		Animism
Qom	Guaicuruan → Toba Qom	Argentina, Paraguay, Bolivia		Christianity, Animism
Quechua	Quechuan	Peru, Bolivia, Ecuador, Colombia, Argentina	Ayacucho, Cajamarca–Canaris, Central, Chachapoyas, Cusco, Inga, Huanca, Kichwa, Lamas, North Bolivian, Pacaraos, Puno, Q'ero, Santiagueno, Saraguro, South Bolivian	Christianity → Catholicism, Inca religion
Qulla	Quechuan → Quechua II → Southern Quechua	Qullaw (Argentina, Bolivia, Chile)		Christianity → Catholicism
Razials	English-based creole languages → San Andres-Providencia Creole	Colombia (San Andres and Providencia)		Christianity → Protestantism
Ramkokamekra	Macro-Je → Je → Canela	Brazil (Northeast Region)		Animism
Ranquel	Araucanian → Mapudungun → Ranquel	Argentina (La Pampa Province)		Native American religion
Sanapaná	Mascoian → Sanapaná; Indo-European → Romance → Spanish; Tupian → Guarani; Indo-European → Germanic → German → Plautdietsch	Paraguay (Gran Chaco)		Christianity, Animism
Saramaka	Indo-European → Germanic → English → Saramaccan	Suriname		Winti, Christianity → Moravian Church
Selk'nam	Chonan → Selk'nam, Indo-European → Romance → Spanish	Tierra del Fuego (Argentina, Chile)		Animism, Christianity
Shiriana	Arawakan → Shiriana, Arutani language	Brazil (Amazonas, Amazon rainforest), Venezuela (Amazon rainforest)	Auake	Animism
Shuar	Chicham → Shuar	Peru (Peruvian Amazonia), Ecuador (Oriente)		Christianity, Shamanism, Animism
Sino-Guyanese	Sino-Tibetan → Sinitic → Hakka; Indo-European → Germanic → English → Guyanese Creole	Guyana		Buddhism, Daoism, Christianity
Sino-Surinamese	Sino-Tibetan → Sinitic → Hakka; Indo-European → Germanic → Dutch, Sranan Tongo	Suriname		Christianity; Buddhism; Daoism
Siona	Tucanoan → Western Tucanoan → Siona	Ecuador (Sucumbios), Colombia (Putumayo)		Animism
Talians	Indo-European → Romance → Venetian → Talian	Brazil (Serra Gaúcha)		Christianity → Catholicism
Tapayuna	Macro-Jê → Jê → Tapayuna	Brazil (Mato Grosso)		Ethnoreligion
Tehuelche	Chonan → Tehuelche, Araucanian → Mapudungun, Indo-European → Romance → Spanish	Argentina (eastern Patagonia)		Animism, Christianity
Terena	Arawakan → Terena; Brazilian Sign language; Terena Sign language	Brazil (Mato Grosso, Mato Grosso do Sul)		Shamanism
Ticuna	Ticuna–Yuri → Ticuna	Brazil (Amazonas)		Shamanism
Tiriyo	Cariban → Tiriyo	Brazil, Suriname		Shamanism
Trumai	Trumai	Brazil (Mato Grosso)		Animism
Tsimané	Macro-Panoan → Moseten–Chonan → Tsimané	Bolivia (Beni)	Mosetén	Traditional tribal religion
Uru	Uru-Chipaya → Uru; Aymaran → Aymara	Bolivia (La Paz), Peru (Puno)	Uru-Chipaya, Uru-Murato, Uru-Iruito	Christianity → Catholicism; Traditional Religion
Waorani	Waorani	Ecuador	Toñampare, Quenahueno, Tihueno, Quihuaro, Damuintaro, Zapino, Tigüino, Huamuno, Dayuno, Quehueruno, Garzacocha, Quemperi Mima, Caruhue, Tagaeri	Animism, Christianity
Wapishana	Arawakan → Wapishana; South Rupununi Sign Language	Brazil, Guyana		Shamanism
Warao	Warao	Venezuela, Guyana		Shamanism
Wayuu	Arawakan → Wayuunaiki	Colombia (La Guajira), Venezuela		Ethnic religion, Christianity → Catholicism
Wichí	Matacoan → Wichí-Chorote → Wichí languages	Argentina, Bolivia (Tarija department)	Vejoz, Güisnay, Nocten	Animism
Xambioá	Macro-Je → Karajá	Brazil (Tocantins)		Christianity, Animism
Xavante	Macro-Je → Je → Xavante	Brazil (Mato Grosso)		Shamanism
Xerente	Macro-Je → Je → Xerente	Brazil (Tocantins)		Christianity and traditional folk religion → Folk Catholicism
Xokleng	Macro-Je → Je → Xokleng	Brazil (Santa Catarina)		Shamanism
Yahgan	Yahgan; Indo-European → Romance → Spanish	Tierra del Fuego (Argentina, Chile)		Christianity → Protestantism
Yanomami	Yanomaman	Southeastern Venezuela, and northern Brazil		Shamanism
Ye'kuana	Cariban → Ye'kuana	Venezuela		Shamanism
Zoró	Tupian → Monde → Gavião of Jiparaná → Zoró	Brazil (Mato Grosso)		Christianity
