= List of endangered languages in South America =

Language Endangerment Status by UNESCO Atlas of the World's Languages in Danger category

Extinct (EX)
- Extinct (EX): (lists)

Endangered
- Critically Endangered (CR); Severely Endangered (SE); Definitely Endangered (DE); Vulnerable (VU): (list); (list); (list); (list)

Safe
- Safe (NE): no list
- Other categories
- Revived (RE); Constructed (CL): (list); (list)
- Related topics: Atlas of the World's Languages in Danger; Endangered Languages Project; Ethnologue; Unclassified language; List of languages by total number of speakers
- UNESCO Atlas of the World's; Languages in Danger categories

An endangered language is a language that it is at risk of falling out of use, generally because it has few surviving speakers. If it loses all of its native speakers, it becomes an extinct language. UNESCO defines four levels of language endangerment between "safe" (not endangered) and "extinct":

- Vulnerable
- Definitely endangered
- Severely endangered
- Critically endangered

South America is a continent of the Americas, situated entirely in the Western Hemisphere and mostly in the Southern Hemisphere, with a relatively small portion in the Northern Hemisphere. It is bordered on the west by the Pacific Ocean and on the north and east by the Atlantic Ocean; North America and the Caribbean Sea lie to the northwest.

== Argentina ==
Language	Comments	Speakers	Source
Eastern Bolivian Guaraní language		51,000	Red Book
Eklenhui language		800	
Iyo'wujwa Chorote language		1,900	
Mapuche language		260,000	Red Book
Mbyá Guaraní language		15,050	Red Book
Mocoví language		3,000	Red Book
Nivaclé language		14,000	Red Book
Pilagá language		4,000	Red Book
Santiagueño Quechua language		60,000	Red Book
Toba Qom language		31,580	Red Book
Weenhayek language		1,900	
Wichí Lhamtés Vejoz language		31,500	
Wiznay language		26,500	

== Bolivia ==
Language	Comments	Speakers	Source
Araona language		110	Red Book
Ayoreo language		4,700	Red Book
Baure language		20	
Bororo language		1,400	Red Book
Cavineña language		600	Red Book
Chácobo-Pakawara language		1,150	Red Book
Chimané language		5,300	Red Book
Chipaya language		1,800	Red Book
Chiquitano language		2,400	Red Book
Eastern Bolivian Guaraní language		51,000	Red Book
Ese Ejja language		700	Red Book
Guarayu language		8,400	Red Book
Ignaciano language		unknown	Red Book
Itonama language		1	
Iyo'wujwa Chorote language		1,900	
Kallawaya language	Ritual language of the Kallawaya people	none	Red Book
Leco language		20 (2001 Simon van de Kerke)	
Machinere language		1,080	Red Book
Movima language		1,400	Red Book
Nivaclé language		14,000	Red Book
Pakawara language		50	
Pauna language		10	Red Book
Reyesano language		12-15	
Sirionó language		300	Red Book
Tacana language		1,200	Red Book
Toba Qom language		31,580	Red Book
Toromona language		200	Red Book
Trinitario language		unknown	Red Book
Yaminawa language		2,729	Red Book
Yuqui language		120	Red Book
Yuracaré language		2,700	Red Book

== Brazil ==
Language	Comments	Speakers	Source
Anambe language		7 (1991 SIL); 77 (1993 SIL)	
Apiaca language		2 (1986 Rodrigues)	
Arikapu language		6 (1998 SIL)	
Arua language		12 (1990)	
Arutani language		17 in Brazil (1986 SIL); Population total all countries: 19	
Cafundo Creole language		40 (1978 M Gnerre, U Estadual de Campinas).	
Guato language		40 (1993 SIL); 382 (1993 SIL).	
Himarima language		40.	
Jabuti language		5 (1990).	
Juma language		4 (1998); There were 300 in 1940.	
Karafawyana dialect		40 (1995 SIL).	
Karipuna language		12 to 15 (2000 SIL).	
Katawixi language		10 (1986 SIL).	
Katukina language		1 (1976 SIL) 360.	
Kreye language		30 (1995 SIL).	
Mapidian language		50 in Brazil (1986 Howard).	
Monde language		30 (1995 AMTB).	
Ofaye language		15 (2002); 37 (1995 AMTB).	
Oro Win language		5 (1996 SIL); 55 (1998).	
Piraha language		150 speakers in 2004. Ethnic population: 200.	
Purubora language		2 (2002 SIL).	
Sikiana language		33 in Brazil (1986 SIL); Population total all countries: 48.	
Tariano language		100 in Brazil (1996 A Aikhenvald); 1,500 in Brazil (1985 Rodrigues).	
Torá language		40 (1990); 120 (1990 YWAM).	
Xipaya language		2 (2000 SIL).	

== Chile ==
Language	Comments	Speakers	Source
Aymara language		1.7 million	Red Book
Huilliche language		few	Red Book
Kawésqar language	Also known as Alacalufe	20 (1996 Oscar Aguilera); Population includes 10 in Puerto Eden.	Red Book
Mapuche language		260,000	Red Book

== Ecuador ==
Language	Comments	Speakers	Source
Shiwiar language		7,970	Red Book
Awa Pit language		13,000	Red Book
Cha'palaa language		5,870	Red Book
Cofán language		1,000	Red Book
Eperara language		3,600	Red Book
Waorani language		2,000	Red Book
Secoya language		1,200	Red Book
Shuar language		35,000	Red Book
Siona language		500	Red Book
Tsafiki language		2,300	Red Book
Zaparo language		1 (2000 SIL)	

== French Guiana ==
Language	Comments	Speakers	Source
Arawak language		2,500	Red Book
Carib language		8,600	Red Book
Emerillon language		400	Red Book
Palikúr language		1,500	Red Book
Wayana language		1,700	Red Book
Wayampi language		1,200	Red Book

== Guyana ==
Language	Comments	Speakers	Source
Akawaio language			Red Book
Arekuna language			Red Book
Karina language			Red Book
Lokono language			Red Book
Makushi language			Red Book
Mawayana language		50 (1986 Howard)	
Patamona language			Red Book
Wapishana language			Red Book
Warao language			Red Book

== Paraguay ==
Language	Comments	Speakers	Source
Ache language			Red Book
Angaite language			Red Book
Ava-Guarani language			Red Book
Ayoreo language			Red Book
Enlhet language			Red Book
Guana language			Red Book
Guarani-Nandeva language			Red Book
Guarayo language			Red Book
Ishir language			Red Book
Maka language			Red Book
Manjui language			Red Book
Mbya language			Red Book
Nivacle language			Red Book
Pai-Tavytera language			Red Book
Sanapana language			Red Book
Toba-Maskoy language			Red Book
Toba-Qom language			Red Book

== Peru ==
Language	Comments	Speakers	Source
Achuar-Shiwiar language			Red Book
Aguaruna language			Red Book
Amahuaca language			Red Book
Andoa-Shimigae language			Red Book
Arabela language			Red Book
Bora language			Red Book
Campa Ashaninca language			Red Book
Campa Asheninca language			Red Book
Campa Caquinte language			Red Book
Campa Nomatsiguenga language			Red Book
Candoshi-Shapra language			Red Book
Capanahua language			Red Book
Cashibo-Cacataibo language			Red Book
Cashinahua language			Red Book
Chamicuro language		2 (2000 Adelaar); 10 to 20 (2000 Adelaar).	
Chayahuita language			Red Book
Cocama-Cocamilla language			Red Book
Culina language	Madija	1300	Red Book
Ese Eja language			Red Book
Harakmbut language			Red Book
Huambisa language			Red Book
Huitoto language			Red Book
Inapari language		4 (1999 SIL)	
Iquito language		35 (2002 SIL); 1 monolingual 500.	
Isconahua language		82 (2000 WCD)	
Jaqaru language			Red Book
Jebero language		2,000 to 3,000 (2000 W Adelaar).	
Machiguenga language			Red Book
Mashco Piro language		20 to 100 (1976 SIL); All are completely monolingual.	
Matses-Mayoruna language			Red Book
Ocaina language			Red Book
Omagua language		10 to 100 in Peru (1976 SIL); Population total all countries: 10 to 100; 627 (1976).	
Orejon language			Red Book
Piro language		20 to 100 in 1976	Red Book
Resigaro language		14 (1976 SIL).	
Secoya language			Red Book
Sharanahua language			Red Book
Shipibo-Conibo language			Red Book
Taushiro language		1 (2002 SIL).	
Ticuna language			Red Book
Urarina language			Red Book
Wariapano language			Red Book
Yagua language			Red Book
Yaminahua language			Red Book
Yanesha language			Red Book
Yora language			Red Book

== Suriname ==
Language	Comments	Speakers	Source
Akurio language		10 (2000 E.B. Carlin)	
Carib language			Red Book
Lokono language			Red Book
Mawayana language			Red Book
Sikiana language		15 in Suriname (2001 Carlin).	
Trio language			Red Book
Tunayana language			Red Book
Wayana language			Red Book

== Venezuela ==
Language	Comments	Speakers	Source
Akawaio language			Red Book
Anun language			Red Book
Arutani language		2 in Venezuela (2002 SIL).	
Baniva language			Red Book
Bari language			Red Book
Cuiba language			Red Book
Guahibo language			Red Book
Guajiro language			Red Book
Hoti language			Red Book
Karina language			Red Book
Kurripako language			Red Book
Lokono language			Red Book
Máku language		extinct	Red Book
Makushi language			Red Book
Mandahuaca language			Red Book
Mapoyo language		3 (2000 Muller).	
Nengatu language			Red Book
Panare language			Red Book
Patamona language			Red Book
Pemono language		1 (2000 M-C Mattei Muller)	
Pepojivi language			Red Book
Piapoko language			Red Book
Piaroa language			Red Book
Puinave language			Red Book
Sape language		5 (2007)	
Saliva language			Red Book
Sanema language			Red Book
Tunebo language			Red Book
Uruak language			Red Book
Warao language			Red Book
Warekena language			Red Book
Yabarana language		20 (1977 Migliazza).	
Yanam language			Red Book
Yanomam language			Red Book
Yanomami language			Red Book
Yaruro language			Red Book
Yekuana language			Red Book
Yukpa language			Red Book
