= Languages of Paraguay =

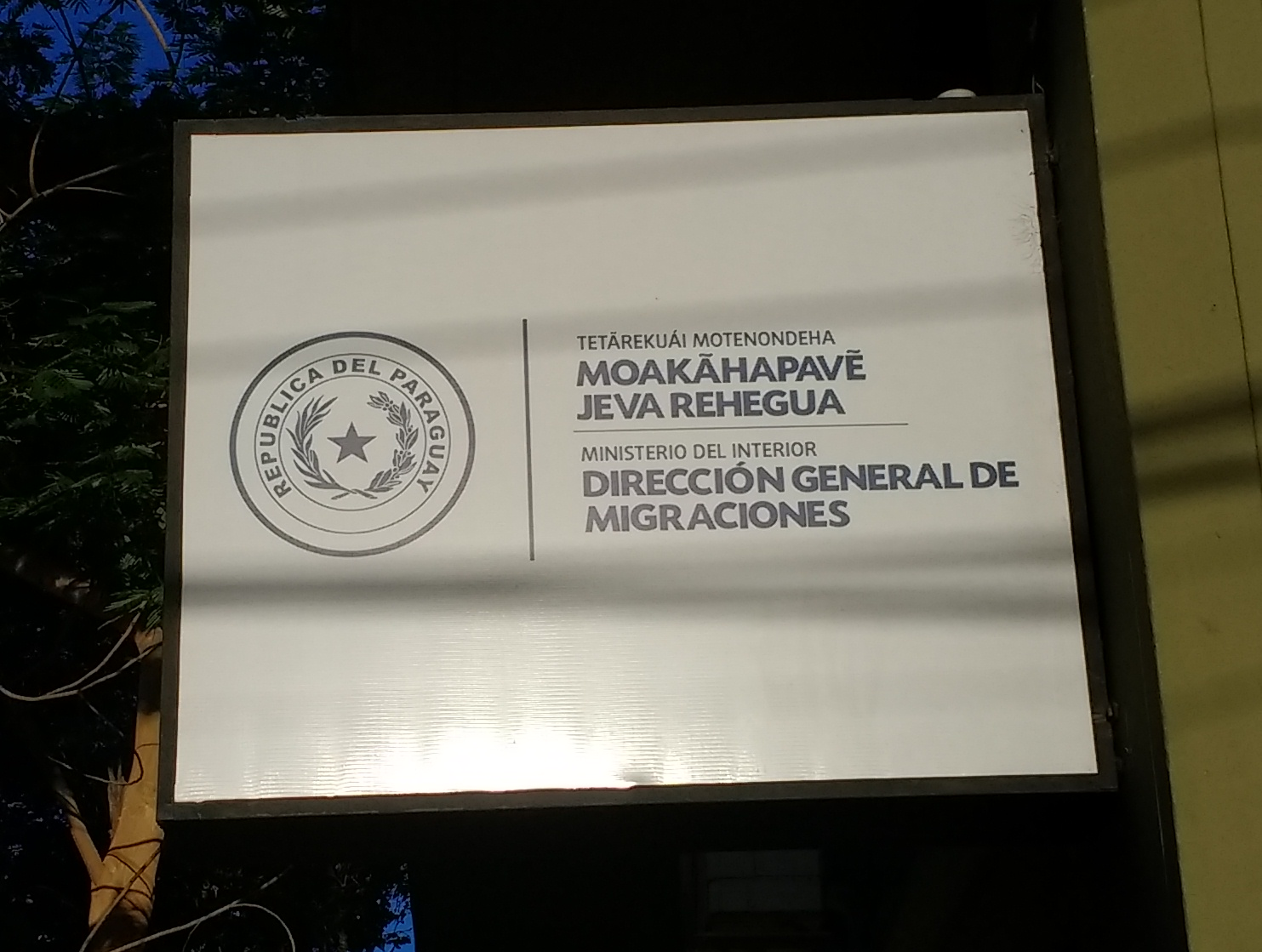
- Sign in Asunción in Guaraní and Spanish
- Official: Spanish, Guaraní
- Indigenous: Toba Qom, Angaité, Enlhet, Enxet, Kaskihá, Sanapaná, Toba-Maskoy, Iyo'wujwa Chorote, Maka, Nivaclé, Aché, Ava Guarani, Pai Tavytera, Ayoreo, Chamacoco
- Vernacular: Paraguayan Spanish, Andean Spanish, Jopara
- Minority: Plautdietsch
- Immigrant: Portuguese, German
- Foreign: French, English
- Signed: Paraguayan Sign Language
- Keyboard layout: Spanish Latinamerican QWERTY

The Republic of Paraguay is a mostly bilingual country, as the majority of the population uses Spanish and Guaraní. The Constitution of Paraguay of 1992 declares it as a multicultural and bilingual country, establishing Spanish and Guaraní as official languages. Spanish, an Indo-European language of the Romance branch, is understood by about 90% of the population as a first or second language. Guaraní, an indigenous language of the Tupian family, is understood by 77%, and its use is regulated by the Academy of the Guaraní Language.

According to Instituto Cervantes' 2020 report "El Español: Una lengua viva", 68.2% of the Paraguayan population (4,946,322 inhabitants) has decent mastery of the Spanish language. The remaining 31.8% (2,306,350 inhabitants) has minimal mastery of the language; the majority of them are Guaraní speakers and speak Spanish as a second language. Only 7.93% are monolingual in Guaraní and do not understand Spanish, a figure that has gone down in the last thirty years.

The most distinct characteristic of Paraguayan culture is the persistence of Guaraní alongside Spanish, these being the official languages of the nation. The mixed form of these languages that also includes code-switching is known as Jopara. Besides Spanish and Guaraní, there are another 19 languages of indigenous origin that are spoken by about 50,000 indigenous Paraguayans. Portuguese is also spoken by some 650,000 "Brasiguayos", the majority of whom are located near the border with Brazil. Other minority languages are German, Italian, Ukrainian, Japanese, Chinese, Arabic, etc.

According to data in the National Census of Population and Housing of the year 2012, carried out by the Dirección General de Estadísticas, Encuestas y Censos (today Instituto Nacional de Estadística), the most spoken languages in Paraguayan homes are: 46.3% Spanish and Guaraní (or Jopara), 34% only Guaraní, and 15.3% only Spanish; the rest speak other languages. The departments with the highest rate of domestic Guaraní speakers, according to EPH 2017, are: San Pedro (78.87%), Caazapá (77.39%), and Concepción (71.34%), while the places that Guaraní is spoken the least include: Asunción (8.95%), Central (15.9%), and Alto Paraná (37.75%). Spanish predominates in these last few departments.

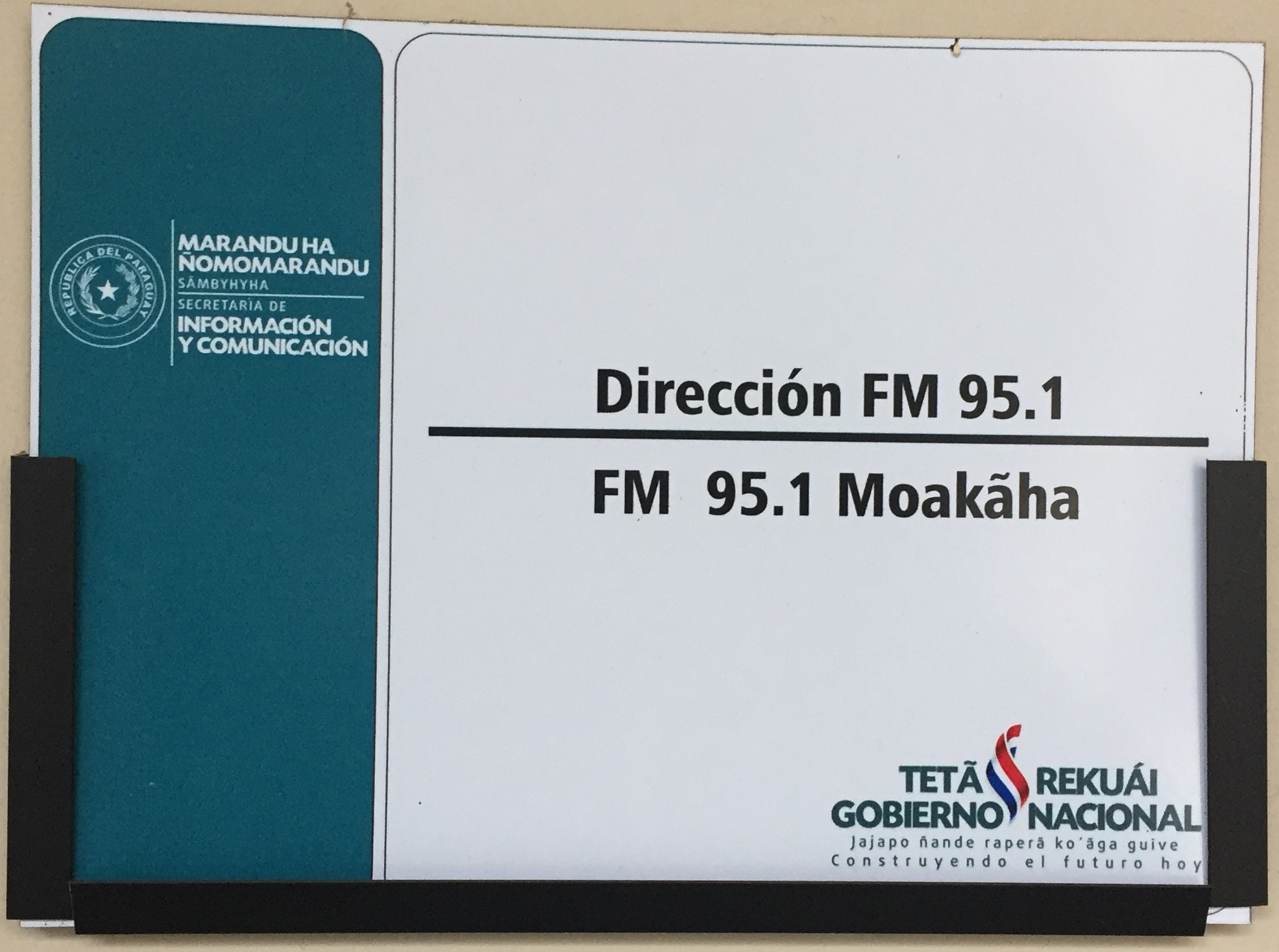
A sign in Asunción, bilingual in Guaraní and Spanish

Guaraní is the only indigenous language of the Americas whose speakers include a large proportion of non-indigenous people. This is an anomaly in the Americas where language shift towards European colonial languages (in this case, the other official language of Spanish) has otherwise been a nearly universal cultural and identity marker of mestizos (people of mixed Spanish and Amerindian ancestry), and also of culturally assimilated, upwardly-mobile Amerindian people.

== Linguistic situation ==
Historically, Guarani was the dominant language in the region of modern day Paraguay and surrounding countries (Northern Argentina, Southwest Brazil, Southeast Bolivia, and Northern Uruguay). Upon arrival of Conquistadors in Paraguay, Castilian Spanish was introduced, but they never really created nor maintained a relevant community of speakers in the area. This was due to little flow of European migrants and especially due to geographic, political, and economic isolation of Paraguay in relation to its neighbors during that time period. In addition, mixed-race couples were encouraged by authorities in the colonial era, which was different from other countries at that time. This meant that Paraguayan families composed of a father of Spanish origin and a mother of Guarani origin were matriarchal; the kids would learn their mother’s language, which was Guarani.

Spanish speakers in Paraguay were always the minority relative to Guarani speakers, who were the majority. The majority of Spanish speakers were Creole or children of immigrants. They were concentrated largely in the capital or in privileged classes toward the middle of the country where they had access to education. Guarani speakers were largely mixed-race or indigenous and came from rural areas. They comprised 90% of the population.

It was only recently toward the end of the 20th century and due to interventions that a notable and late Castellanización (“castillianization” - large inflow of Spanish language and thus large portion of the population becoming exposed to it) occurred in a large part of the population. This was largely due to the improvement of public education, the effects of urbanization, and access to new technology and modes of communication (like the television, the telephone, and the internet). A large portion of the population continued to speak Guarani which therefore caused the majority population to become bilingual. However, 21st century Paraguay has seen a decrease in the use of Guarani met by an increase in the use of Spanish. This phenomenon (castellanización) is similar to those observed by other countries in the Americas between the 19th and 20th centuries.

According to the 2012 census, between 2002 and 2012 the number of Guarani speakers in Paraguay decreased by 10% of the total population while the Spanish language increased its speakers (first and second language speakers). The use of Guarani fell from 86% (2002) to 77% (2012). Guarani-only speakers fell from 37% in 1992 to 27% in 2002 and dropped drastically to 8% in 2012. The use and comprehension of Spanish increased in the last fifty years, surpassing 50% of speakers (first and second language) during the mid-20th Century and reaching numbers up to 90% in the present day.

== Official languages ==
The majority of the population of Paraguay uses both languages (Spanish and Guarani). About 70% of the population is bilingual, speaking Spanish and Guarani at least to some degree. True bilingualism in which both languages are spoken equally is difficult in practice for many people. This is especially true in the interior parts of the country, where Guarani is the native language or predominant language. On the other hand, Spanish is the native language or predominant language for a large part of the population born in large urban areas. In spite of the official ranking of Guarani in the country and the number of Guarani speakers, Spanish continues to be the dominant language in government affairs, official documents, judicial processes, administrative processes, professional affairs, business, media, and education (classes are given mainly in Spanish); Guarani is mainly used in colloquial settings, between family and friends. Due to this, there is diglossia and not exactly bilingualism in Paraguay.

Among bilingual people in the country, there is a preference to use Guarani in intimate, personal, and familiar situations. Language spoken also varies by rural and urban environments. For example, homes in Asunción and other big cities speak mainly in Spanish. In suburban areas of these big cities or in the interior of smaller cities, Guarani is mainly spoken. For reference, 37% of the population of Paraguay lives in rural zones.

In addition to an urban rural split, age of the speaker also contributes to the language spoken: mostly younger generations from urban areas speak Spanish; mostly younger people in rural areas and adults (born before 1980) from urban areas speak both languages equally. Adults from rural areas mainly speak Guarani. Socio-economic class does not correlate with language much. Some associate Spanish with more privileged classes, but the reality is that it is correlated only if the speaker speaks both languages. It is ultimately associated with urban vs. rural and/or generation (age) of the speaker.

Colloquially, they also use Yopará (aka jopara) which is a mix of Spanish and Guaraní; it is a linguistic phenomenon similar to Spanglish (a mix of Spanish and English) or Portuñol (mix of Spanish and Portuguese), among others. 46.3% of Paraguayan homes use Yopará, according to statistics from the 2012 DGEEC Census. The exact definition of Yopará differs in some ways according to different linguists: some define Yopará as “Spanish spoken in Guaraní,” which was largely caused by criollización of Guaraní and Spanish. For others, Yopará is a transition language for Guaraní speakers who learn Paraguayan Spanish.

=== Spanish ===
Currently, 90% of the population speaks and/or understands Spanish to at least a limited extent. Around 60% speak it as their first language (L1) and 40% of the country speaks both Guaraní and Spanish as a first language, being bilingual. Another smaller percentage is monolingual in Spanish or with little proficiency in Guarani (~20%). The other 30% speak Spanish as a second language (L2) and are more proficient in another language, commonly Guaraní. 10% cannot speak spanish, 8% being Guaraní speakers and 2% speaking other indigenous languages.

The expansion of public education, as well as the effects of urbanization, the globalization of technology and mass media such as the Internet, cell phones, television, etc., in recent years, served to expand the Spanish language in the interior of the country, mostly Guarani-speaking. The use and understanding of Spanish has increased in the last thirty years, going from an average of 50% of speakers (as a first or second language) during the 20th century, to numbers close to 90% for the present. Spanish monolingualism (people who do not speak or understand Guarani) seems to be increasing especially among the new generation of young people born in urban areas.

Spanish is the majority language in the most populated urban centers, and is the primary or mother tongue of those born in cities. Spanish has been and continues to be used mostly in governmental matters, official documents, judicial processes, administrative and professional processes, in business, in the media and in education; classes are mainly taught in Spanish. Fifteen percent of Paraguayans speak mostly Spanish at home, while 46% of Paraguayans alternate between Spanish and Guarani at home, according to data from the 2012 Census.

Paraguayan Spanish has three main variants depending on the speaker and geographical area: the urban or Rioplatense variant (spoken mainly by the younger generation in Asunción and other large cities), with greater influence of Rioplatense Spanish. The Guaraní or interior variant (spoken mainly by the majority of the bilingual population), with greater influence of Guaraní, and the foreign variant, spoken by Brasiguayos or Mennonites. The characteristics of Paraguayan Spanish are not the same among all Paraguayan Spanish speakers, especially in the pronunciation of the letters “r” and “s”, which differ according to the social environment.

=== Guaraní ===
Seventy-seven percent of the population understands and/or speaks Guaraní as a first or second language (this includes speaking in Jopara); while the number of fluent Guaraní speakers is considerably reduced, especially among the younger generation born in urban areas. The remaining 23% who do not speak Guaraní are divided into those who are monolingual in Spanish, or bilingual in Spanish and other languages (such as Portuguese, English or German), but not in Guaraní. On the other hand, just over 2 million Paraguayans (about 30% of the country's total) continue to use Guaraní as their first language; and they speak little Spanish, although most of them understand it quite well. Only 7.93% are monolingual Guaraní (only speak Guaraní and do not understand Spanish).

Guaraní creole, Modern Guaraní, or Paraguayan Colloquial Guaraní is the most spoken variant by Paraguayans within the Guarani language, which is different from the Guarani spoken by indigenous people. Several authors agree that jehe'a is the typical Paraguayan Guarani, which has slight influences from Spanish, as well as the "guaranization" of Spanish words, since only the indigenous people speak the "guarani-ete" (pure or closed Guarani). It differs from Jopara, because the latter is rather a hybrid between Spanish and Guarani, or a Spanish influenced by Guarani.

Historically, Guarani has been the majority language of Paraguayans. Currently, most Paraguayans have Guaraní as their mother tongue and use it frequently in their immediate environment or in its Yopará version (mixed with Spanish). According to the 2012 Census, 34% of Paraguayans continued to speak mostly Guaraní at home.

Guaraní was declared a co-official language of Paraguay in the 1992 Constitution, thus occupying the same official status as Spanish, and since that decade the MEC has promoted the teaching of Guaraní as a subject in public schools. Previously, Guaraní was a national language according to the Constitution of previous years.5 Guaraní has been a predominantly oral language, and for Guaraní to have writing, it had to be adapted to Latin letters. As of 2010, the Academy of the Guaraní Language was created to ensure the preservation and evolution of the Guaraní language, and the Language Law (No. 4251) was enacted.

=== Variations within official languages ===
Standard Spanish, Paraguayan Spanish, Yopará, Paraguayan Guaraní (jehe'a) and Guarani-ete (pure or closed Guaraní) are all common dialects. The term standard Spanish refers to Spanish as defined by the Real Academia Española, although some Hispanic American characteristics are accepted.

Paraguayan Spanish, like Paraguayan Guarani, is marked by the influence of the other language, although it is not as accentuated as in Yopará. The transition zone between the different varieties is fluid, and therefore there is not always a strong distinction between different varieties. Below the following table, you will find several examples of the variants spoken in the country, with their translation into standard Spanish.

Language (dialect)	Characteristics	Speakers
Standard Spanish	Neutral or standard Spanish, without the influence of other languages.	The Spanish world at large
Paraguayan Spanish	Paraguayan Spanish, with a small amount of influence from Guaraní.	Paraguayans who speak Spanish as their mother tongue with a low mastery of Guaraní.
Jopara	Paraguayan Spanish with Guaraní influence. Also defined as a mix of Spanish and Guaraní (guarañol).	Bilingual Paraguayans.
Paraguayan Guaraní (jehe'a)	Paraguayan Guaraní, with influence from Spanish.	Paraguayans who speak Guaraní as their mother tongue with a low mastery of Spanish.
Guaraní-ete	Guaraní without a Spanish influence.	Indigenous people and Guaraní tribes.

- Paraguayan Spanish:
  - "Me voy a comprar para mi camisa". (English: I am going to buy a shirt, influenced by Guaraní "ajoguáta che kamisarã". In Standard Spanish it would be "Me compraré una camisa".)
  - "Vení un poco" (English: I came alone, calque of the word "ejumína" from Guaraní. In standard Spanish it would be "Vení únicamente.)
- Jopara:
  - "Ñasolucionáta nuestro problema": "Solucionaremos nuestro problema" (English: We will solve our problem, the word "ñasolucionáta" is influenced by Guaraní. "Ña" (pronounced "ña") is equivalent to "Nosotros", and "ta" refers to the future tense)
  - "Jaha a comprar": "Vamos a comprar" (English: We are going shopping, the word "Jaha" is loaned from Guaraní, meaning "we go".)
- Paraguayan Guaraní (jehe'a):
  - "Upéinte ou la iména": (English: It was then his wife came,"la" is the Spanish feminine definite article, not originally present in Guaraní.
  - "Che alee peteĩ aranduka": (English: I read a book, the word "alee" is loaned from Spanish "leer", but is "guaranized" (A+lee=I read). In Standard Guaraní, it would be "Che amoñe'ẽ peteĩ aranduka")

== Indigenous languages ==
About 50,000 Paraguayans speak an indigenous language besides Guaraní:

- Aché language
- Angaité language
- Ava Guarani language
- Ayoreo language
- Chamacoco language
- Enlhet language
- Enxet language
- Iyoʼwujwa Chorote
- Kaskihá language
- Maká language
- Nivaclé language
- Pai Tavytera language
- Sanapaná language
- Toba-Maskoy language
- Toba Qom language

Besides Spanish, Guaraní, and all other previous languages, Portuguese, Plautdietsch, Standard German and Italian are spoken as well.

== See also ==
- Demographics of Paraguay
