= Lengua language =

Lengua is the Spanish word for "tongue". It is used for either of two Mascoian languages of Paraguay:

- Enxet language (Southern Lengua)
- Enlhet language (Northern Lengua)

== See also ==
- Lengua (disambiguation)
