= Demographics of Paraguay =

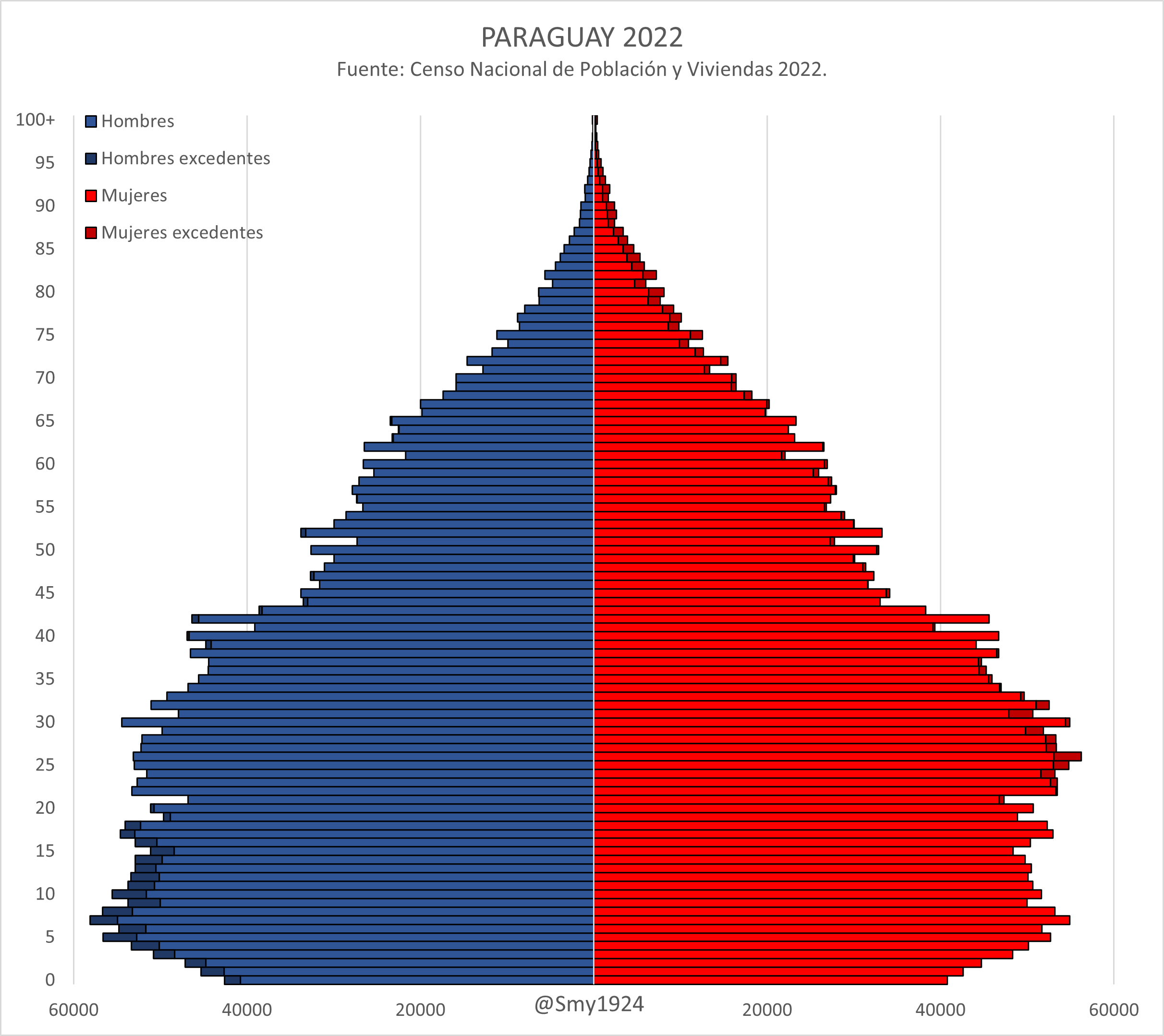
- Population pyramid of Paraguay in 2022
- Population: 6,460,159 (2026)
- Growth rate: 0.67% (2026)
- Birth rate: 15.1 births/1,000 population (2026)
- Death rate: 6.3 deaths/1,000 population (2026)
- Life expectancy: 75.8 years
- Fertility rate: 1.90 children born/woman (2026)
- Infant mortality: 13.7 deaths/1,000 live births
- Net migration rate: −2.2 migrant(s)/1,000 population (2026)
- Immigrant share: 2.6% (2024)

Age structure
- 0–14 years: 24.66%
- 15–64 years: 66.48%
- 65 and over: 8.86%

Nationality
- Nationality: Paraguayan
- Major ethnic: Multiracial (77.5%); Mestizo (74.5%); Mulatto (3.5%); Others (0%)
- Minor ethnic: White (20%); Spanish (N/D); Italian (N/D); German (N/D); Lebanese (N/D; Others (N/D); Indigenous (1.5%–2.29%); Guaraní (1.17%); Nivaclé (0.29%); Enxet (0.28%); Others (0.55%); East Asian (0.5%); Japanese (N/D); Others (N/D); Black (0–0.13%)

Language
- Official: Spanish and Guarani
- Spoken: Languages of Paraguay

Paraguay's population is distributed unevenly through the country. The vast majority of the people live in the eastern region, most within 160 kilometres (99 mi) of Asunción, the capital and largest city, which borders on Argentina to the south and west. The Gran Chaco in the north-west, which accounts for about 60% of Paraguayan territory, is home to less than 4% of the population.

Ethnically, culturally, and socially, Paraguay has one of the most homogeneous populations in South America. About 75% of the people are mestizo (mixed Spanish and Guaraní Native American descent), 20% are Whites, and the rest are small minorities of Indigenous or Afro Paraguayan origin. Little trace is left of the original Guaraní culture except the language, which is spoken by 90% of the population. About 75% of all Paraguayans also speak Spanish. Guaraní and Spanish are official languages.

Paraguay has a history of foreign settlement, especially in the 20th century: Italians (around 40% of the total Paraguayan population is of full or partial Italian descent); Germans (the majority are Mennonites) with long-time Paraguayan dictator Alfredo Stroessner (President, 1954–1989) himself of German ancestry; Japanese with Okinawans; Koreans; Chinese; Arabs, Ukrainians; Poles; Southern Europeans; Jews; Brazilians; and Argentines are among those who have settled in Paraguay. There are also an estimated 234,000 Afro-Paraguayans, or 4% of the population.

European and Middle Eastern immigrants began making their way to Paraguay in the decades following the Paraguayan War of 1864–1870 (from 1870 onward). Only 28,000 men and 200,000 women had survived the war, the reason why Paraguay had since then a high rate of illegitimate births. The government pursued a pro-immigration policy in an effort to increase population. Government records indicated that approximately 12,000 immigrants entered the port of Asunción between 1882 and 1907, of whom almost 9,000 came from Italy, Germany, France, and Spain. Migrants also arrived from neighboring Spanish American countries, especially Argentina. The immigrant ethnic groups kept their cultures and languages to some extent, especially Brazilians – known as "Brasiguayos".

Official records gave an imprecise sense of the number of Brazilians who came to the country. According to the 1982 census, 99,000 Brazilians resided in Paraguay. Most analysts discounted this figure, however, and contended that between 300,000 and 350,000 Brazilians lived in the eastern border region.

Analysts also rejected government figures on the number of immigrants from South Korea, Hong Kong and Taiwan. The 1982 census reported that there were 2,700 Koreans in Paraguay, along with another 1,100 non-Japanese or non-Korean Asian immigrants. Virtually all Koreans and Chinese lived in Ciudad del Este or Asunción and played a major role in the importation and sale of electronic goods manufactured in Asia.

Paraguay became the site of radical and progressive colonies inspired by political thinkers of the late 19th and early 20th centuries. A group of radical socialist Australians in the 1890s voluntarily went to create a failed master-planned community, known as Nueva (New) Australia (1893–1897); and Elisabeth Nietzsche, a German racial ideologist and sister of philosopher Friedrich Nietzsche came to Paraguay in her attempt to build a colony, Nueva Germania (Neues Deutschland) (founded 1886) devoted to a hypothetical pure white "Nordic" society.

A 2022 census found that Paraguay's population shrank as a production of migration and having smaller families, as well as better data integrity, resulting in a loss of over one million.

== Population size and structure ==
Historical population
Year	Pop.	±% p.a.
1950	1,328,452	—
1962	1,819,103	+2.65%
1972	2,357,955	+2.63%
1982	3,029,830	+2.54%
1992	4,152,588	+3.20%
2002	5,163,198	+2.20%
2012	5,756,397	+1.09%
2022	6,284,020	+0.88%
2026	6,460,159	+0.69%

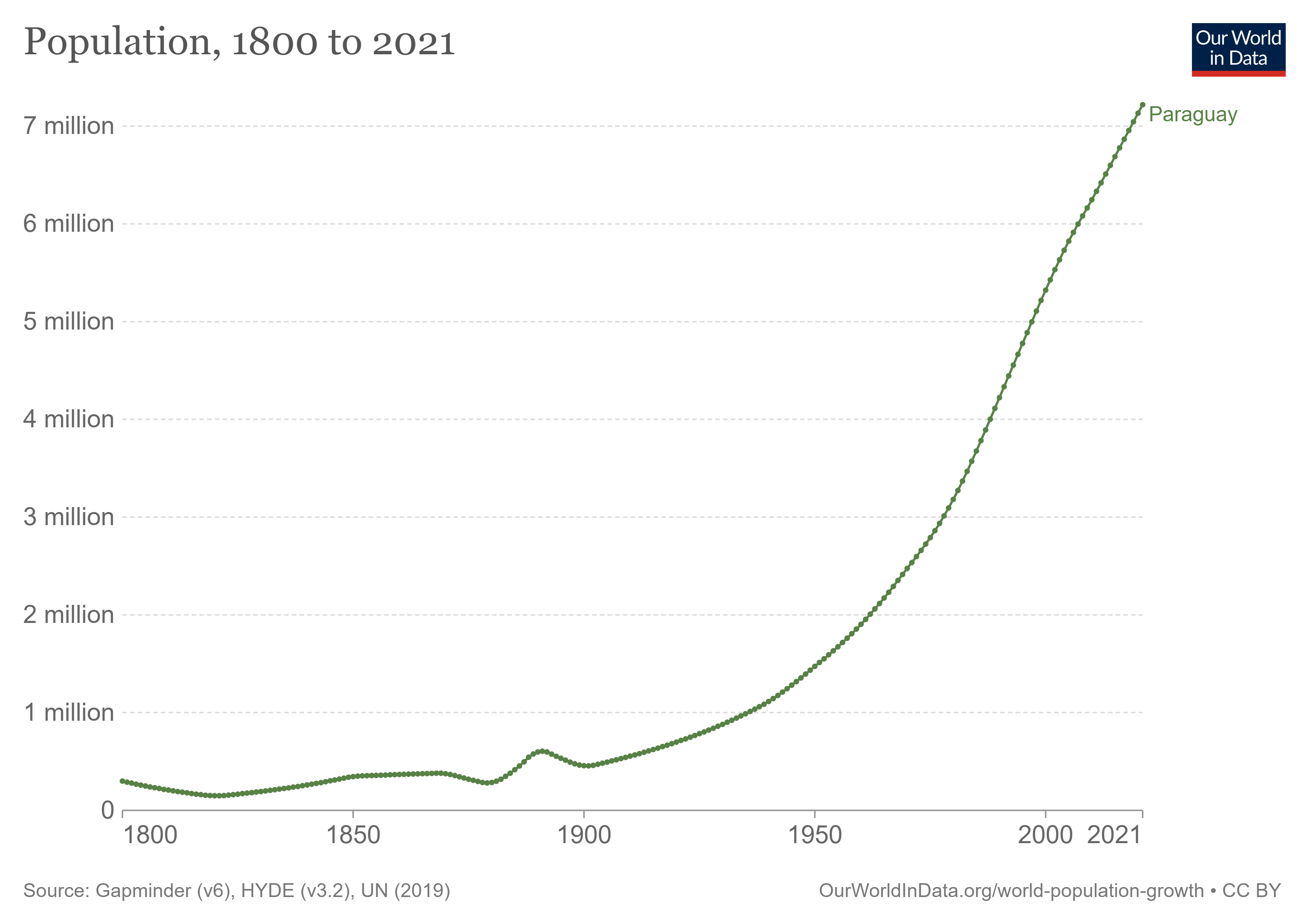
Demographics of Paraguay, Data of Our World in Data, year 2022; Number of inhabitants in thousands.

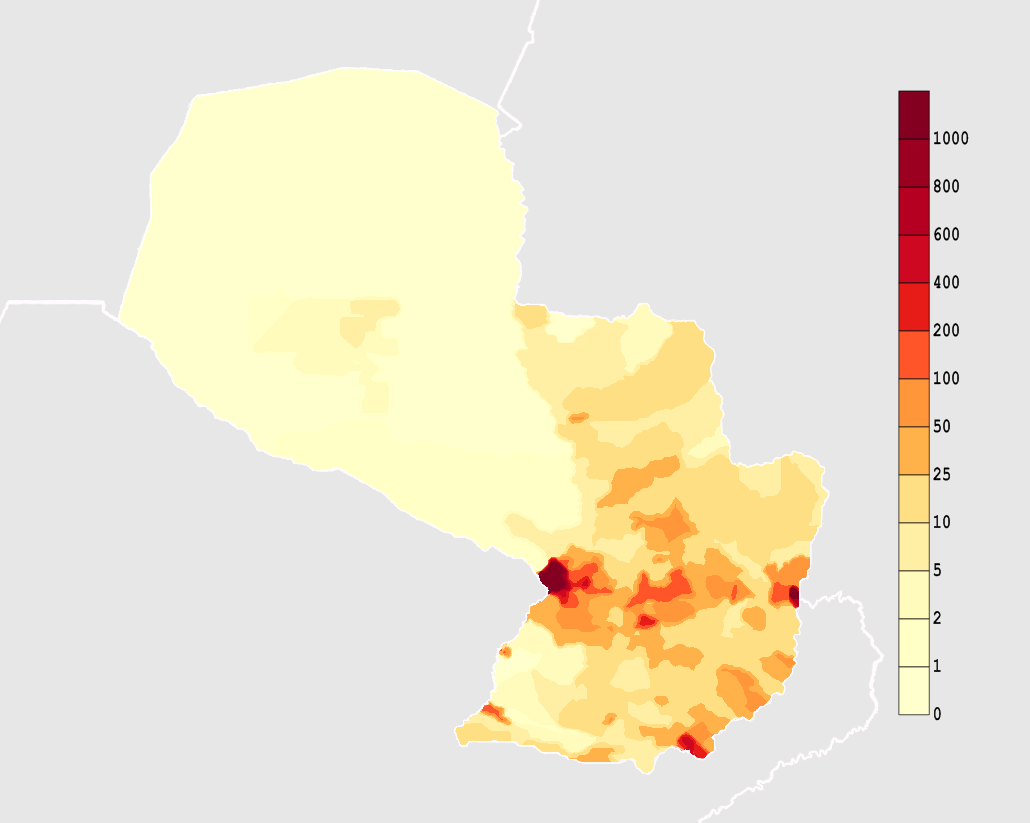
Paraguay population density (people per km^{2})

According to the National Institute of Statistics of Paraguay, based on the 2022 census, the total population was 6,460,159 in 2026, compared to only 1,473,000 in 1950. The proportion of children below the age of 15 in 2025 was 25%, 66.4% was between 15 and 64 years of age, while 8.6% was 65 years or older.

Year	Total population ( × 1000)	Population percentage in age bracket		
Year	Total population ( × 1000)	0–14	15–64	65+
1950	1 473	47.0%	50.1%	2.9%
1955	1 674	47.5%	49.5%	3.0%
1960	1 906	47.8%	49.0%	3.2%
1965	2 176	47.5%	49.2%	3.3%
1970	2 483	46.1%	50.4%	3.5%
1975	2 802	44.1%	52.3%	3.6%
1980	3 195	42.5%	53.8%	3.8%
1985	3 698	41.6%	54.5%	3.9%
1990	4 244	41.4%	54.6%	4.0%
1995	4 795	40.3%	55.4%	4.3%
2000	5 155	38.5%	57.2%	4.4%
2005	5 467	35.5%	59.8%	4.7%
2010	5 668	32.9%	61.8%	5.2%
2015	5 912	30.4%	63.7%	5.9%
2020	6 202	28.9%	64.3%	6.8%
2025	6 417	25.0%	66.4%	8.6%
2030	6 618	22.9%	67.1%	10.0%

== Vital statistics ==
=== Registered births and deaths ===
Births and deaths according to the National Institute of Statistics of Paraguay, based on the 2022 census.

Year	Population	Live births	Deaths	Natural increase	Crude birth rate	Crude death rate	Rate of natural increase	Annual migration	Total increase	Total fertility rate
2006	5,511,383	119,776	31,293	88,483	21.7	5.7	16.0	−46,796	41,687	2.84
2007	5,551,108	117,679	31,698	85,981	21.2	5.7	15.5	−48,210	37,771	2.75
2008	5,588,470	115,997	32,124	83,873	20.8	5.7	15.1	−46,913	36,960	2.67
2009	5,627,047	114,895	32,574	82,321	20.4	5.8	14.6	−42,118	40,203	2.60
2010	5,668,042	114,460	33,062	81,398	20.2	5.8	14.4	−39,613	41,785	2.55
2011	5,710,913	114,693	33,582	81,111	20.1	5.9	14.2	−37,109	44,002	2.52
2012	5,756,397	115,689	34,134	81,555	20.1	5.9	14.2	−34,605	46,950	2.50
2013	5,805,006	117,095	34,708	82,387	20.2	6.0	14.2	−32,101	50,286	2.50
2014	5,856,972	118,638	35,354	83,284	20.3	6.0	14.3	−29,597	53,687	2.50
2015	5,912,082	119,627	36,009	83,618	20.2	6.1	14.1	−27,093	56,525	2.50
2016	5,969,497	119,508	36,657	82,851	20.0	6.1	13.9	−24,589	58,262	2.47
2017	6,028,083	118,278	37,276	81,002	19.6	6.2	13.4	−22,084	58,918	2.43
2018	6,086,887	116,073	37,840	78,233	19.1	6.2	12.9	−19,580	58,653	2.36
2019	6,144,832	113,041	38,690	74,351	18.4	6.3	12.1	−17,076	57,275	2.28
2020	6,202,478	109,451	43,179	66,272	17.6	7.0	10.6	−8,226	58,046	2.19
2021	6,247,916	105,422	64,274	41,148	16.9	10.3	6.6	−8,226	32,922	2.10
2022	6,284,020	100,984	45,995	54,989	16.1	7.3	8.8	−15,555	39,434	2.00
2023	6,326,825	100,271	38,567	61,704	15.8	6.1	9.7	−15,269	46,435	1.97
2024	6,372,623	99,346	39,225	60,121	15.6	6.2	9.4	−14,995	45,126	1.95
2025	6,417,076	98,388	39,904	58,484	15.3	6.2	9.1	−14,712	43,772	1.92
2026	6,460,159									

=== Fertility ===
Total Fertility Rate (Wanted Fertility Rate):

Year	TFR (Total)
1990	4.6
1995	4.0
2000	3.57
2005	2.94
2010	2.55
2015	2.50
2020	2.19
2025	1.92
2030	1.84
2035	1.79
2040	1.75
2045	1.73
2050	1.72

== Ethnic groups and languages ==
Ethnic groups of Paraguay
Ethnic groups	percent
Non-Indigenous	97.75%
Indigenous	2.25%

Languages of Paraguay
Languages	percent
Guaraní	90%
Spanish	87%

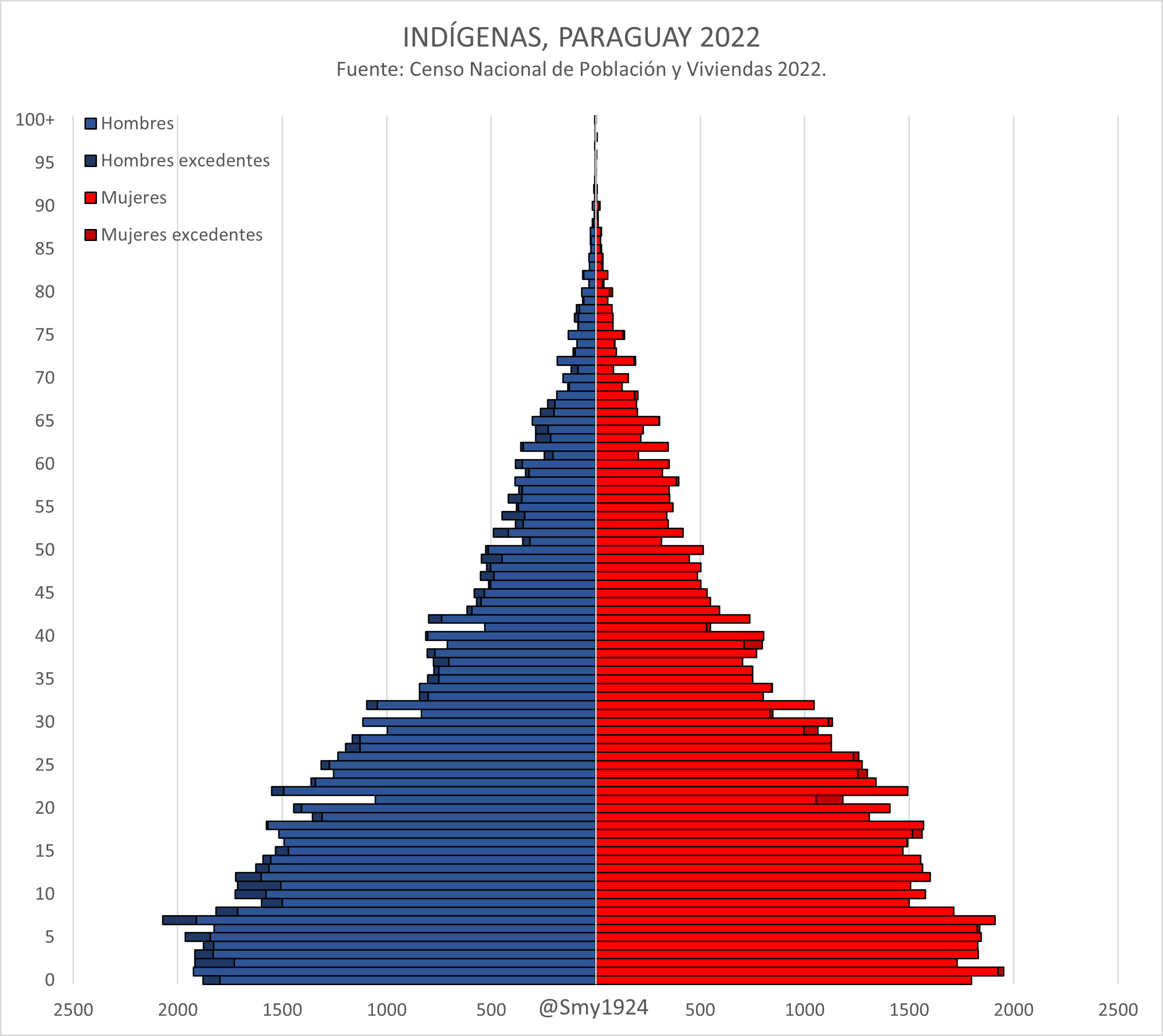
Indigenous population, 2022 census; TFR: 3.77

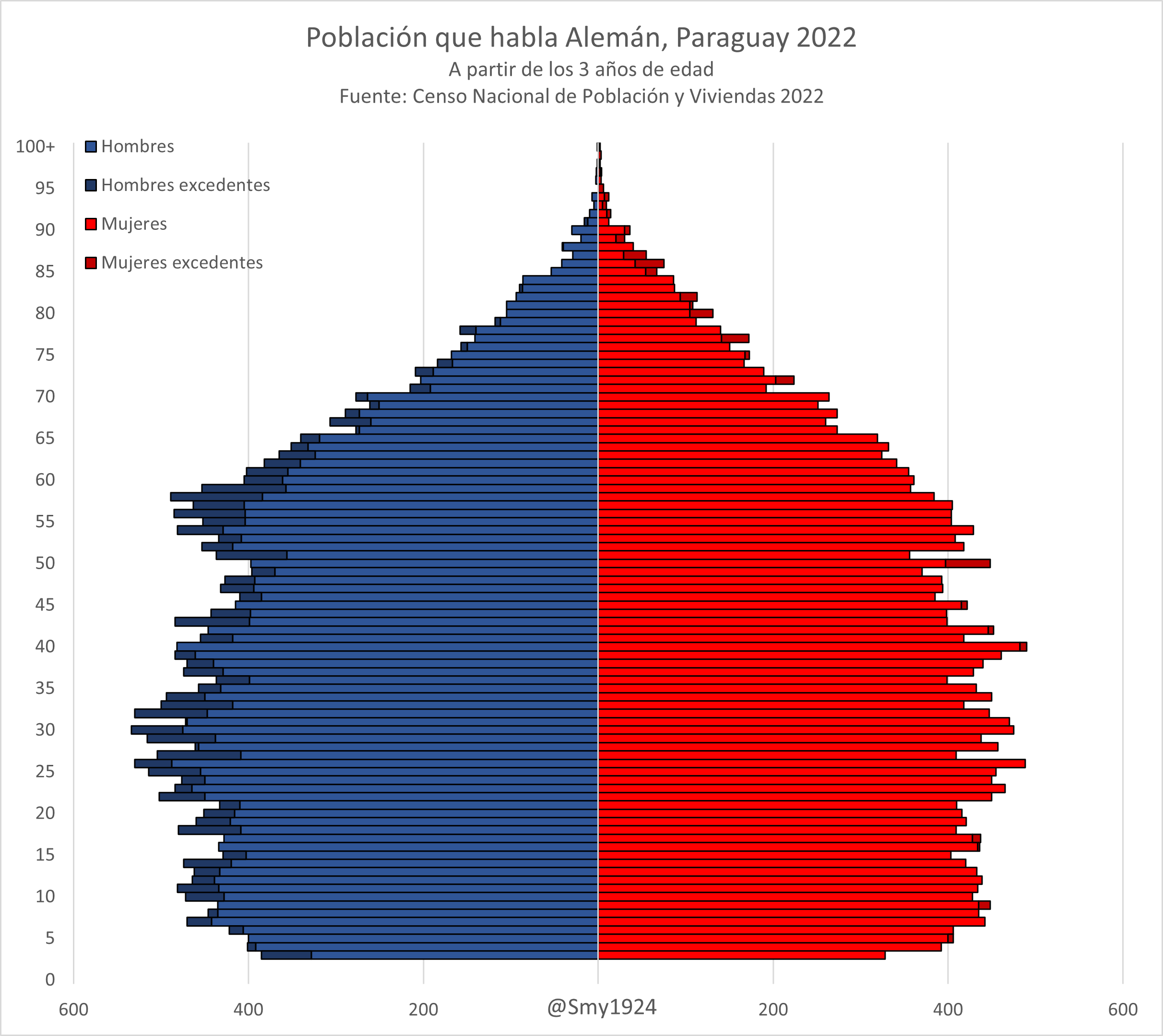
German speakers, 2022 census; TFR: 1,66.

The Paraguay's predominant ancestry is European, which represents a large part of the population, mainly descendants of Spaniards and Italians (who have contributed to repopulating the country after the Triple Alliance War) but there are also a large number of people of German ancestry, due to the German Mennonites (majority in the western part of the territory). There are 17 Mennonite colonies, only in the Paraguayan Chaco. It is one of the Latin American countries with the least indigenous traits (due to the fact that the traditional Paraguayan population; the Spanish mixture of Guaraní, had been annihilated by the war in 1870, which is why the country had to repopulate by resorting to immigration, especially the Italian in that country.) Taking into account the high fertility, Paraguay registers a majority young population structure. Of every ten people, four are under the age of 15 (2,339,000) and the population aged 15 to 29 represents a quarter of the total population. According to the Census (ECLAC, 1998), the population of indigenous nature that year was 29,482 people, that is, about 0.7% of the national population. There is a low percentage of people with distinctively Amerindian features and the absence of people with African features. The majority of the population is made up of mestizos who are descendants of the original population, the Guarani, and Europeans.

— Paraguay Embassy in Germany

== Religion ==
Religions of Paraguay
Religions	percent
Roman Catholic	89.6%
Protestant	6.2%
Other or Unspecified	1.9%
Other Christian	1.1%
None	1.1%
