= Toba language =

Toba language may refer to:

- Toba Batak language, an Austronesian language spoken in North Sumatra province in Indonesia
- Toba-Maskoy language, a Mascoian language, one of several languages of the Paraguayan Chaco called Toba
- Toba Qom language, a Guaicuruan language spoken in Argentina, Paraguay, and Bolivia by the Toba people
- Pilagá language (Pilaca), a Guaicuruan language spoken in western Formosa Province in northeastern Argentina
