= Lengua =

Lengua (Spanish for 'tongue') may refer to:

- Beef tongue, a dish

- Lengua estofado, a dish made from beef tongue from the Philippines

- The Enxet people, previously known as the Lengua, an indigenous group of Paraguay
- Lengua language, collective name for the Northern Lengua language (now called the Enlhet language) and Southern Lengua language (now called the Enxet language) of Paraguay
- Évert Lengua, Peruvian footballer
