= Manaos (disambiguation) =

Manáos is an old name for Manaus, a city in Amazonas, Brazil.

Manaos may also refer to:

- Manaos Athletic Club, a defunct football club in Manáos
- Manao people, who gave their name to Manaus
- Manaos (film), a 1978 Spanish-Italian-Mexican adventure film
- Manaos (drink), a soft drink produced by Refres Now S.A.
