= Guana language =

Guana is a generic ethnic name of the Gran Chaco. It may refer to:

- Guana language (Paraguay)
- Guana language (Brazil)
- Guana language (Argentina)
