= Xiriana language =

Xiriana may be:

- Ninam language (Xirianá), a Yanomaman language
- Shiriana language (Xiriâna), an Arawakan language
