= Toba-Maskoy language =

Mascoian language of northern Paraguay

Maskoy
- Toba
- Native to: Paraguay
- Ethnicity: 2,100 (2007)
- Native speakers: 1,700 (2007)
- Language family: Mascoian: Maskoy

Language codes
- ISO 639-3: tmf
- Glottolog: toba1268
- ELP: Enenlhet

Maskoy, or Toba-Maskoy, is one of several languages of the Paraguayan Chaco (particularly in the northern region of Paraguay) called Toba. It is spoken on a reservation near Puerto Victoria. Toba-Maskoy is currently a threatened language at risk of becoming an extinct language, due to the low number of native speakers.

== History ==
Toba-Maskoy originates from Paraguay, specifically in the Chaco region of the Alto Paraguay department.

It is believed that around 1870 some Toba chiefs immigrated from Argentina escaping constant victimization of their peoples, thus settling in Alto Paraguay. Since that transitional period, the language suffered both linguistically and culturally. To this day it is rare to find grammar or writings in Toba-Maskoy due to a significant loss of language among the Toba.

== Geographic distribution ==
Toba-Maskoy is spoken near Puerto Victoria, in the north of Paraguay.

=== Official Status ===
Though Toba-Maskoy is not an official language of Paraguay, it is well known in the northern part of El Chaco.

== Classification ==
Toba-Maskoy is one of the five members of the Maskoy linguistic family, the other four include: Angaite, Enxet, Kaskiha, and Sanapaná.

== Number system ==
The below table shows the Toba number system, which has separate words for $1, 2, 4$ and all other numbers being composites of these words. According to Closs, the number 1 is always used in terms of addition.

While the number $4$ is derived from the word "equals", which indicates the understanding of the concept of 2- groupings. Multiplication in the Toba Number system only occurs in the form of doubling, however this number system demonstrates the understanding of additive and basic multiplicative properties.

Toba numbers
Decimal Number	Toba	Notes
1	nathedac	
2	cacyni, nivoca	
3	cacaynilia	2+lia
4	nalotapegat	'equals'
5	nivoca cacainilia	$2+3$
6	cacayni cacynilia	$2 \times 3$
7	nathedac cacayni cacaynilia	$1 + (2 \times 3)$
8	nivoca nalotapegat	$2 \times 4$
9	nivoca nalotapegat nathedac	$(2 \times 4)+1$
10	cacayni nivoca nalotapegat	$2+(2 \times 4)$
