= Paraguayans =

People identified with the country of Paraguay

Paraguayos (Spanish) Paraguaigua (Guarani)
- Flag of Paraguay

Regions with significant populations
- Paraguay 6,109,644 (2022 census)
- Argentina: 690,948
- Brazil: 75,889
- Spain: 64,547
- United States: 34,307
- Canada: 8,000
- Japan: 2,215

Languages
- Paraguayan Spanish, Guarani, other indigenous languages, Portuguese, German

Religion
- Predominantly Roman Catholicism, Protestantism, Indigenous religions

Paraguayans are the citizens and nationals of Paraguay. Though the majority of Paraguayans reside in Paraguay, significant communities have been established in multiple countries, most noticeably Argentina, Spain, United States, Brazil.

== History ==
The first inhabitants of Paraguay were the Guarani people.

== Racial and ethnic groups ==
As in other Latin American countries, in Paraguay, from the onset of Spanish colonization and settlement, miscegenation or mestizaje was the norm rather than the exception. Paraguay has one of the most homogeneous populations in South America. About 75% of the people are mestizo (mixed Spanish and Guaraní Native American descent), 20% are Whites, and the rest are small minorities of Indigenous or Afro Paraguayan origin.

Main self-identified ethnic group (Lizcano Fernández)
Ancestry/colour
Mestizo	74.5%
White	20.0%
Black / mulatto	3.5%
Indigenous	1.5%
Asian	0.5%

=== Indigenous ===
While only a 1.7% of Paraguay's population is fully indigenous according to the 2012 national census, 75% of the population identifies as being partially of indigenous descent; however, the majority do not identify as being indigenous but as Mestizos.

== Languages ==
Paraguay is predominantly a bilingual country, as the majority of the population uses Spanish and Guaraní. The Constitution of Paraguay of 1992 established Spanish and Guaraní as official languages. Spanish, an Indo-European language of the Romance branch, is understood by about 90% of the population as a first or second language. Guaraní, an indigenous language of the Tupian family, is understood by 77%, and its use is regulated by the Academy of the Guaraní Language.

According to Instituto Cervantes' 2020 report "El Español: Una lengua viva", 68.2% of the Paraguayan population (4,946,322 inhabitants) has decent mastery of the Spanish language. The remaining 31.8% (2,306,350 inhabitants) belongs to the Group of Limited Competence, having minimal mastery of the language; the majority of them are Guaraní speakers and speak Spanish as a second language. Only 7.93% are monolingual in Guaraní.

== Population ==
#	Department	Population (2022 census)
1	Central	1 866 562
2	Alto Paraná	784 839
3	Asunción	477 346
4	Itapúa	436 966
5	Caaguazú	430 142
6	San Pedro	341 895
7	Cordillera	271 475
8	Concepción	204 536
9	Paraguarí	199 430
10	Canindeyú	189 128
11	Guairá	180 121
12	Amambay	173 770
13	Caazapá	140 060
14	Presidente Hayes	126 880
15	Misiones	114 542
16	Ñeembucú	85 749
17	Boquerón	68 595
18	Alto Paraguay	17 608
Total		6 109 644

=== Sex ===
- Men: 3 078 994: 50,3%
- Women: 3 030 650: 49,7%

== See also ==
- List of Paraguayans
- Criollo people
- Paraguayan Americans
- Paraguayans in Spain
