= Bahuana language =

Extinct Arawakan language of Brazil

Bahuana
- Ciriana, Barawana
- Bahwana
- Pronunciation: [baɸu(w)ana]; [baɻuwana]
- Native to: Brazil
- Ethnicity: Shiriana people, Bahuana people
- Extinct: c. 2000, with the death of Claudina de Souza Soares
- Language family: Arawakan: Central; Bahuanaic; Bahuana

Language codes
- ISO 639-3: xir
- Glottolog: xiri1243
- Linguasphere: 82-AFE-ca

Bahuana (Bahwana, Barawana), or Ciriana (Shiriana, Xiriâna, Chiriana), is an Arawakan language most closely related to Manao and Kariaí, once spoken by the Shiriana people and Bahuana people of Roraima, Brazil. It had an active–stative syntax. The last speaker, Claudina de Souza Soares, died around 2000.

== Phonology ==
=== Consonants ===
Bahuana consonant phonemes
		Bilabial	Dental	Alveolar	Palatal	Velar	Glottal
Plosive	voiceless	p	t		c	k	ʔ ⟨'⟩
Plosive	voiced	b	d		ɟ		
Fricative		ɸ	ts	s	ɕ ⟨x⟩		h
Nasal		m	n		ɲ ⟨ñ⟩		
Liquid		w	ɺ ⟨r⟩		j ⟨y⟩	ɻ ⟨R⟩	

/ɸ/ is commonly labio-palatalized as [ɸᶣ] before front vowels and appears to be in free variation with the uncommonly attested [ꞵ].

=== Vowels ===
Bahuana vowel phonemes
	Front	Back	
	Front	unrounded	rounded
High	i	ɨ	u
Low	e	a	u

== Morphology ==
Bahuana, unlike most Arawakan languages, lacks grammatical gender. This is thought to be due to possible influence from Nheengatu.

== Vocabulary ==
Bahuana basic vocabulary
Bahuana	gloss
hɨɻa(tsɨ)	blood
nikɨsaɨ	heart
saɨ	penis
(saba)taɨ	vulva
taɨda	skin
kiwici	hair
kutabetsa	hair
ciɲuma	beard
tia	excrement
kiwida	head
naukɨsaɨ	eye
kirina	nose
numada	mouth
ninima(da)	tongue
