= Indigenous peoples in Paraguay =

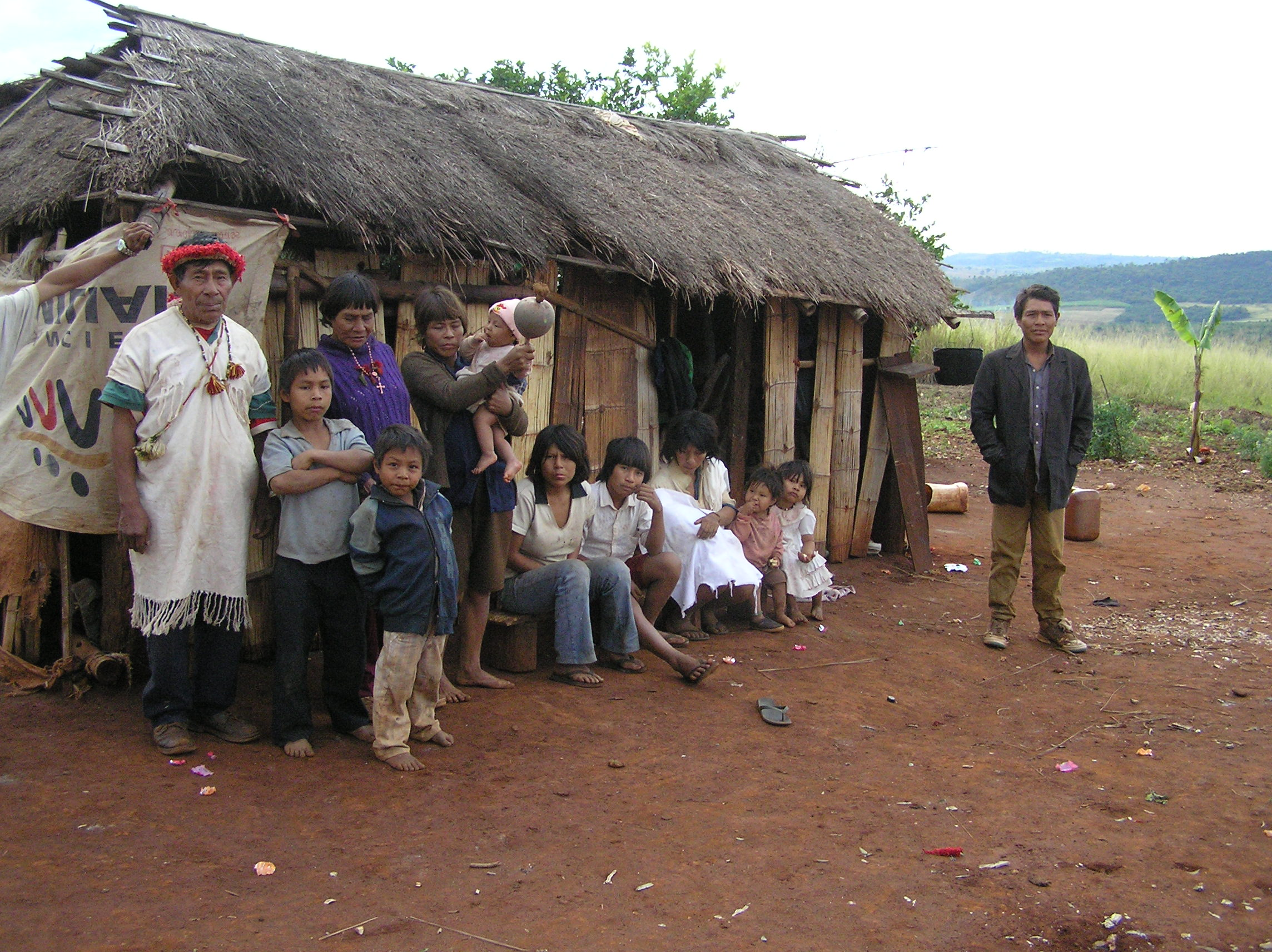
Pai Tavytera people in Amambay Department, 2012

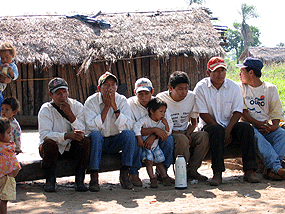
Indigenous people in General Isidoro Resquín, Paraguay.

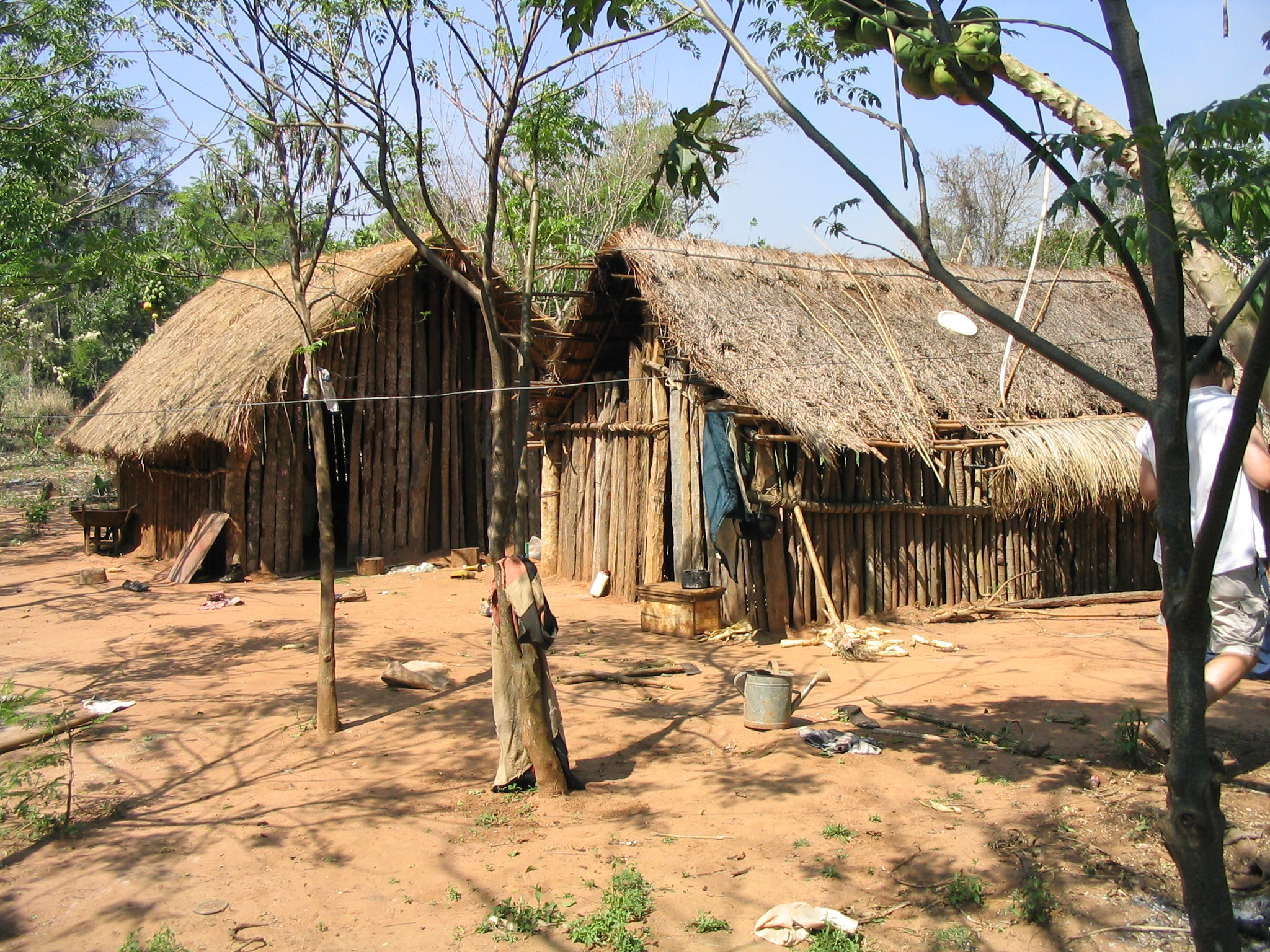
Contemporary Paraguayan Native village, 2003

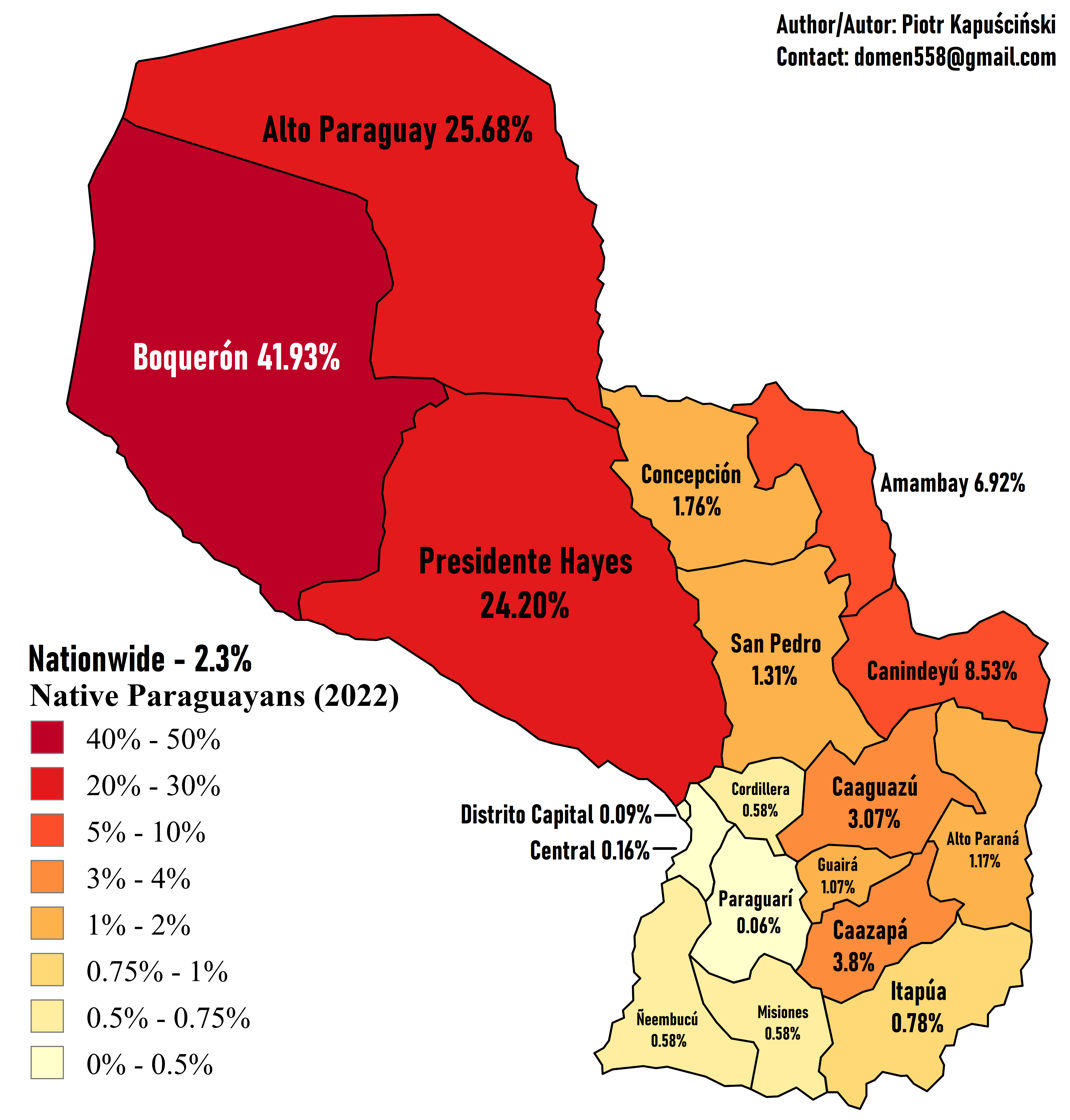
Distribution of Native Paraguayans according to the 2022 census

The Indigenous peoples in Paraguay, or Native Paraguayans, include 17 ethnic groups belonging to five language families. Only 2.3% of Paraguay's population is Indigenous, the majority are Mestizos. Most of the native population lives in the northwestern part of the country, the Gran Chaco.

== Population ==
The Fourth National Indigenous Census, conducted in 2022, recording approximately 140,206 people, or 2.3% of the country's population, as being Indigenous; however, as many as 75% of the Paraguayan population is mestizo, that is of partial Amerindian descent. Since the late 20th century, the Indigenous population is growing faster than the rest of the population. As of 2002, 47.1% of the native population was 14 years old or younger.

== Settlement ==
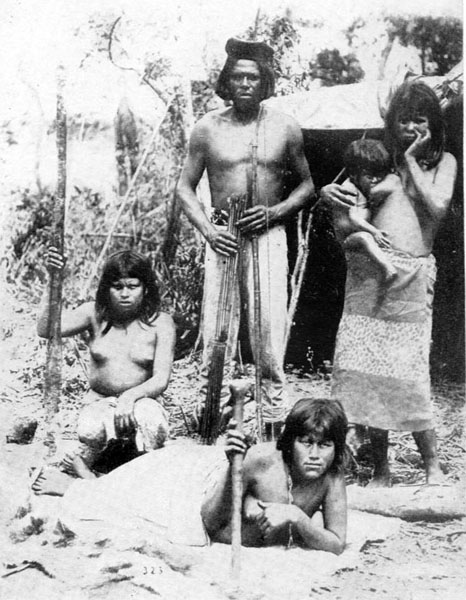
Toba chief, wives, and child, Paraguai River, 1892

An increasing percentage of the registered Indigenous population lives in the northwestern region of Paraguay. The 1981 census reported 32.8% of the Indigenous peoples living there, while 44.2% lived there in 1992, and 50.7% in 2002. The majority of Indigenous peoples live in rural areas in 412 Indigenous communities.

Indigenous reserves are in place to protect uncontacted peoples and other isolated communities.

== Languages ==
Indigenous Paraguayan languages belong to five language families: Guarani, Guaycuru, Maskoy, Mataco-Mataguayo, and Zamuco. The Guarani language, along with Spanish, is an official language of Paraguay and is spoken by 90% of the population.

== Social issues ==
Literacy rates are low among Indigenous peoples in Paraguay, who have an illiteracy rate of 51% compared to the 7.1% rate of the general population.

Access to clean drinking water is a major challenge. Only 2.5% of Paraguay's Indigenous population has access to drinking water and only 9.5% have electricity.

== Tribes ==
- Aché
- Abipón
- Ayoreo
- Chané
- Chamacoco (Ishir)
  - Ebytoso
  - Tomáraho
- Chiripá
- Chorote
- Guana
- Guaraní
- Lengua (Enxet)
- Nivaclé (Chulupí)
- Macá
- Mbayá
- Pai-Tavyter
- Sanapaná
- Toba
- Zamuco

== See also ==
- Deforestation in Paraguay
- Guaraní War
- India Juliana
- Paraguayan Indian art
