= Manao language =

Extinct Arawakan language of Brazil

Manao
- Native to: Brazil
- Region: Manaus
- Ethnicity: Manaos
- Extinct: after 1819
- Language family: Arawakan: Northern; Upper Amazon; Manao languages; Manao

Language codes
- ISO 639-3: None (mis)
- Glottolog: mana1299
- Linguasphere: 82-AJA-aa

Manao is a long-extinct Arawakan language of Brazil. The Manaos gave their name to the present-day city of Manaus, the capital city of the state of Amazonas in Brazil.

== Vocabulary ==
Manao vocabulary (flora, fauna, and cultural artifacts) collected by Natterer (1831) and von Spix in 1819:

English	Manao
opossum (mucura)	uwajali
anteater	juni
sloth	awü
giant armadillo	iweti
paca	gaa
agouti	ba(i)jua
green acouchi (cutiuaia)	adili
squirrel	meeri
rat	körü
tapir	keema
white-lipped peccary	aija
collared peccary	abiádʒi
deer	majuli
coati	kaabi
otter	inewi
jaguar (onça)	hakurana
dog	idi / üdi
titi monkey (zogue-zogue)	okukule
tufted capuchin	uawa
saki monkey (cuxiu)	witʃa
bat	pirö
boto	hunari
manatee	jabɨna
duck	uwai
wild duck (marreca)	wanana
pigeon / dove	ulúju
white-tipped dove (juruti)	e’i
curassow (mutum)	awátuköri
nocturnal curassow (urumutum)	atʃiri
rooster / cock	kalaka
vulture (urubu)	w(u)au
harpy eagle	kukui
scarlet macaw	umadua
yellow macaw	kajalu
parrot	weu
grey-winged trumpeter (jacamim)	dolitʃami
tinamou (inambu)	mami
alligator / caiman	atule
yellow-footed tortoise (jabuti)	ikúli
turtle	méta
big-headed Amazon river turtle (cabeçudo)	(u)wa
yellow-spotted river turtle (tracajá)	talikaja
fish	baikötʃiiki
goliath catfish (piraíba)	(u)waitʃawana
redtail catfish (pirarara)	duma
tiger shovelnose catfish (surubim)	kulöri
arapaima (pirarucu)	mejauü
horse-fly (mutuca)	erekury (Spix)
gourd bowl (cuia)	jamalu
gourd / watermelon	jölölu
coca	hipadu
yam (cará)	ödüru
cassava (mandioca)	kanɨri
cassava shrub (maniva)	kanikati
cassava flour (farinha)	khönökhünödü
cassava bread (beiju)	abutu
tapioca	ɨkaiwati
grass	kalauü
maize / corn	awati
banana	banala
bean	athataɨku
guarana	töwe
tobacco	aili
pipe (smoking?)	-itʃakörü
bow	kulapa
arrow	palátakö
shaman / sorcerer	apa(i)liátiri / maly (Spix)
horn / trumpet	kuama
canoe	iitʃa
caxiri (indigenous beer)	kolua
demon / devil	kamanja / kamainha (Spix) + saráwa (Spix)
God	Wemekeer / Mawary (Spix)
knife	malie
axe	eethi
clay pot	humeeki
jar (camuti)	-olawa
grater (ralo)	dága
hammock	-khira
blowgun (zarabatana)	julua
blowgun dart	ɨkö, julua
