= Sanapaná =

Nomadic tribe inhabiting the lower Gran Chaco of western Paraguay

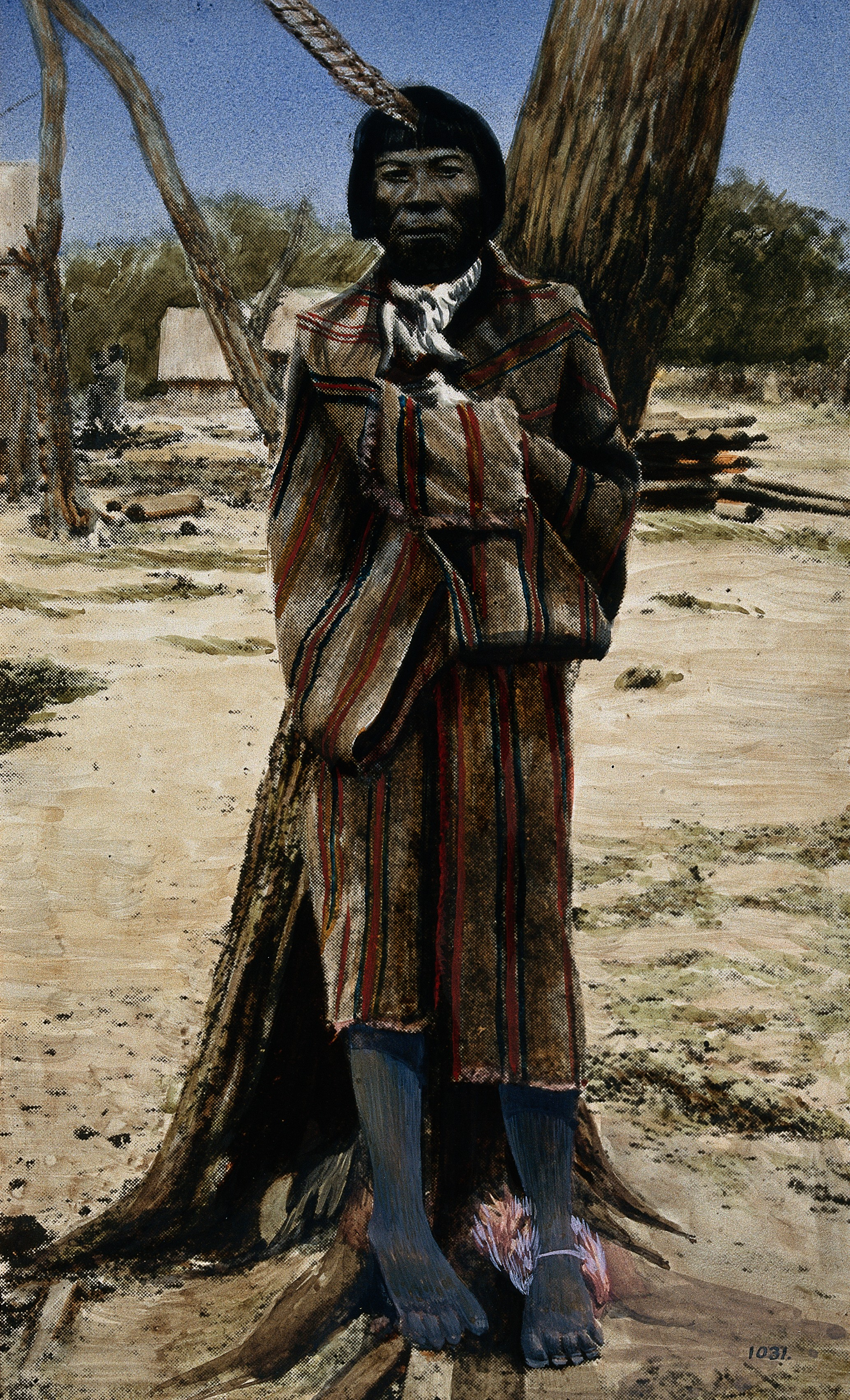
Painting showing a Lengua man

The Sanapana are one of many nomadic tribes inhabiting the lower Gran Chaco of western Paraguay. With the introduction of Mennonite settlements in the central Chaco in the 1930s, many nomadic tribes semi-settled near the Mennonites. The Mennonites established Missions to many of these tribes, often grouping linguistically similar tribes nearby. The Sanapana and Lengua were settled on La Esperanza mission, southeast of Filadelfia, just off the Pan-American Highway. The Lengua, in their tongue, refer to themselves as "Enhlit," which means "the people." The Sanapana refer to themselves as "Nenhlet," which also means "the people." A standard conversation among the Sanapana-Lengua often includes words from their language, mixed with Spanish and Guaraní, the national languages of Paraguay, and some Plautdietsch, the primary language of the Mennonites.

The Sanapana language uses the Latin alphabet, a sample of which is "Tamilachlech coo evalhoc, Jesucristo singmasma coo."
