= Afro–French Guianans =

Black French Guianans
Guyanais afro-français (French)

Total population
- Approx. 123,365

Regions with significant populations
- French Guiana (Approx. 123,365)

Languages
- French, Guianan Creole

Religion
- Christianity

Related ethnic groups
- Afro-Guyanese, Afro-Surinamese

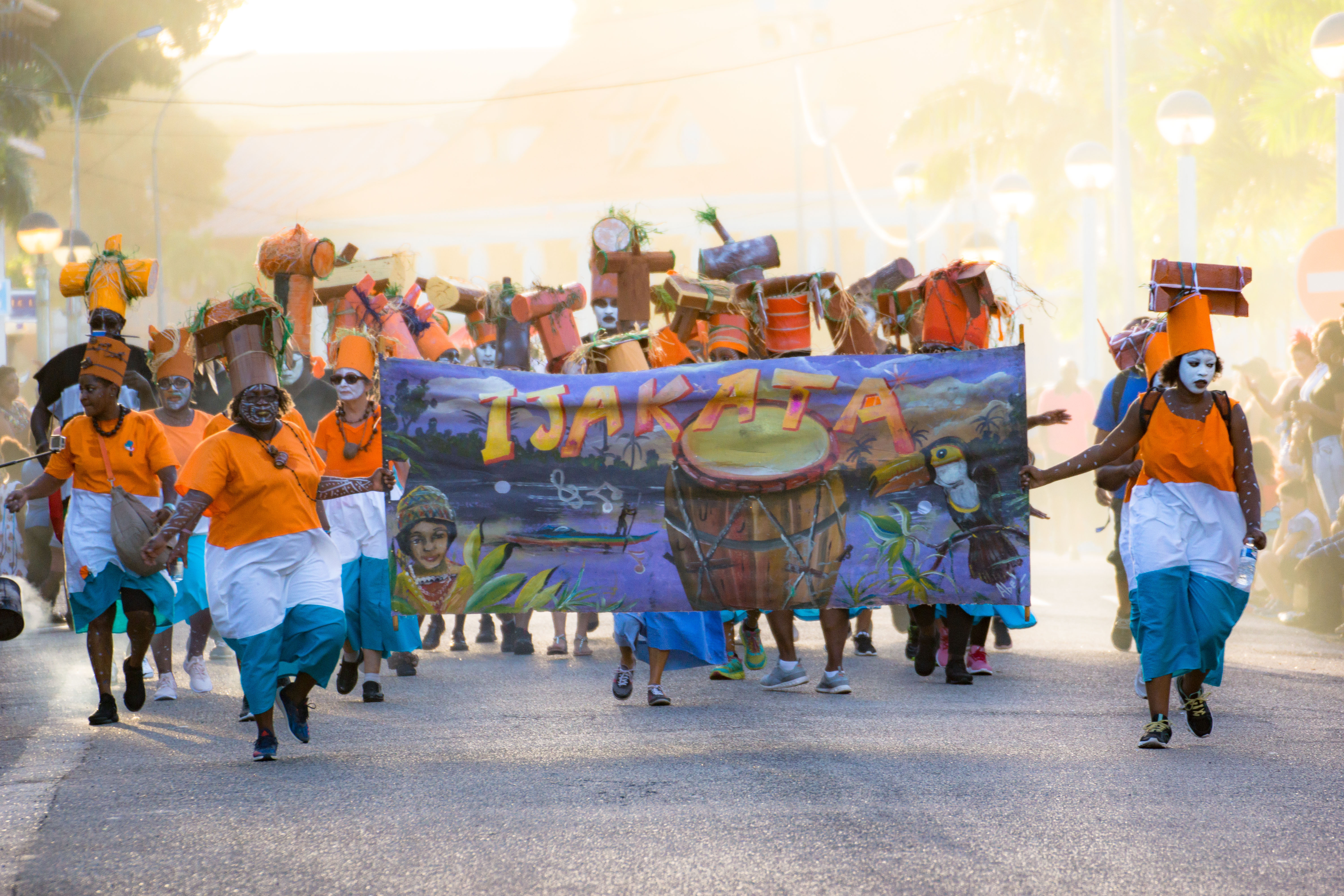
Sunday carnival parade of Afro-French Guianans in Cayenne, parade of the Ijakata group

Afro–French Guianans or Black French Guianans are French Guianan people who are of African descent.

As of 2003, people of African descent (including those of mixed African and European ancestry) are the majority ethnic group in French Guiana accounting for around 66% of the territory's population.

== Notable Afro French Guianans ==
- Allan Saint-Maximin
- Simon Falette
- Florent Malouda
- Lesly Malouda
- Mike Maignan
- Jason Pendant
- Ludovic Baal
- Rodolphe Alexandre
- Kévin Rimane
- Raoul Diagne
- Roy Contout
- Rhudy Evens
- Sloan Privat
- Marc-Antoine Fortuné
