= Manao people =

Manaus
Total population
- 0 (extinct)

Regions with significant populations
- Brazil

Languages
- Manao

Related ethnic groups
- Baniwa

The Manaus, also known as Manaos, were an indigenous ethnic group that inhabited the region surrounding the Negro river of Brazil before the arrival of Portuguese explorers in the region, their name gave origin to the name of the modern Brazilian city of Manaus, the largest city in the Amazon rainforest. In their native language, their name meant 'mother of the gods'.

The most notable leader of the Manaus was Ajuricaba, who led several battles against the Portuguese colonial forces in the Amazon region. He was captured by the Portuguese and was put on a ship that sailed down the Amazon river to bring him to his trial in the city of Belém, but managed to get off his chains and committed suicide by throwing himself into the river, dying by drowning rather than in captivity.

== History ==
The Manaus refused to be enslaved or converted to Catholicism by the Portuguese, launching attacks against the Fort of São José da Barra do Rio Negro, modern Manaus. Through marriage deals with the daughters of Tuxauas, members of the Portuguese army were able to acquire connections with Manaus leaders in order to achieve peace with the people. However, Ajuricaba remained as one of the anti-Portuguese leader of the Manaus, continuing to raid Portuguese settlements in the region with help of neighboring tribes and organizing a river surveillance system in order to stop Portuguese ships from sailing upstream.

The last major war against the Manaus took place in the 1720s, although Ajuricaba himself died before reaching Belém for his trial, two thousand Manaus were brought to the city and sold as slaves. According to Ribeiro de Sampaio, Ajuricaba supposedly has contacts with the Dutch, a theory that was denied by writer Joaquim Nabuco.

The last sighting of the Manaus people occurred in 1819 by German botanist Von Martius in the riverbed of the Negro river. It is believed that the modern Baniwa people are likely descendants of the Manaus.
