= Bahuana people =

Extinct Indigenous people of Brazil

The Bahuana (sometimes called the Barawana or Bahuana) were an Indigenous people of Brazil. They spoke the Shiriana language, and were closely related to the Shiriana people. The last Bahuana, Claudina de Souza Soares, died around 2000.
