= Academy of the Guarani Language =

- Guarani Ñe’ẽ Rerekuapavẽ
- Abbreviation: ALG/GÑR
- Formation: June 12, 2013; 13 years ago
- Location: Asunción Paraguay
- Official language: Guarani
- Website: academiadelalenguaguarani.org.py

The Academy of the Guarani Language (Guarani: Guarani Ñe’ẽ Rerekuapavẽ, Spanish: Academia de la Lengua Guaraní) is a Paraguayan institution that promotes and regulates the Guarani language, one of the official languages of Paraguay and the Mercosur.
