= Mocoví language =

Guaicuruan language of Argentina

Mocoví
- Native to: Argentina
- Ethnicity: Mocoví (2004)
- Native speakers: 3,000 (2011)
- Language family: Guaicuruan: Southern; Mocoví

Official status
- Recognised minority language in: Argentina: Chaco Province

Language codes
- ISO 639-3: moc
- Glottolog: moco1246
- ELP: Mocoví

The Mocoví language is a Guaicuruan language of Argentina spoken by about 3,000 people, mostly in Santa Fe, Chaco, and Formosa provinces.

== Official status ==
In 2010, the province of Chaco in Argentina declared Mocoví as one of four provincial official languages alongside Spanish and the indigenous Qom and Wichí.

== Classification ==
The Mataco-Guicurú language family is a group of 11 indigenous languages of the Americas spoken in Argentina, Bolivia, Brazil and Paraguay, comprising two subfamilies with a total of approximately 100,000 speakers distributed in the Bermejo, Pilcomayo and Paraguay river basins. Other languages of the family are extinct and some others are threatened with extinction.

== Geographical distribution ==
In the province of Santa Fe, it is used mostly by the elderly Mocoví population. Among adults, bilingualism is widespread and among young people Spanish is preferred. In the province of Chaco, the Mocoví language and culture are carefully preserved.

== Phonology ==
=== Consonants ===
The following are the consonants of Mocoví:

		Bilabial	Alveolar	Palatal	Velar	Uvular	Glottal
Nasal		m	n	ɲ			
Plosive/ Affricate	plain	p	t	t͡ʃ	k	q	ʔ
Plosive/ Affricate	voiced		d	d͡ʒ	ɡ	ɢ	ʔ
Fricative			s	ʃ			h
Flap			ɾ				
Lateral			l	ʎ			
Glide		w		j			

=== Vowels ===
Gualdieri (1998) gives the following vowels:

	Front	Central	Back
High	i iː		
Mid	e eː		o oː
Low		a aː	

== Orthography ==
Writing in the Mocoví language was non-existent until the 1950s, when a group of missionaries developed a Latin alphabet writing system for the Toba language, which was later adapted to Mocoví for the translation of the Bible by Alberto Buckwater. This writing system is still based on correspondence with Spanish orthography, so it contains some of its irregularities.
