= Cafundó language =

Secret language

Cafundó
- Cupópia
- Native to: Brazil
- Region: Cafundó, São Paulo
- Native speakers: (40 cited 1978)
- Language family: Indo-European: Italic; Latino-Faliscan; Romance; Western; Ibero-Romance; West Iberian; Galician-Portuguese; Portuguese; Vernacular Brazilian; Caipira; Cafundó
- Early forms: Old Latin: Classical Latin; Vulgar Latin; Galician-Portuguese; Portuguese

Language codes
- ISO 639-3: ccd
- Glottolog: cafu1238

Cafundó (Portuguese pronunciation: [kafũˈdɔ]), or Cupópia ([kuˈpɔpjɐ]), is an argot ("secret language") spoken in the Brazilian village of Cafundó, São Paulo, now a suburb of Salto de Pirapora. The language is structurally similar to Portuguese, with many Bantu words in its lexicon.

Cafundó was at first thought to be an African language, but a later study (1996) by Carlos Vogt and Peter Fry showed that its grammatical and morphological structure are those of Brazilian Portuguese, specifically the rural hinterland Southeastern variety, caipira, whereas its lexicon is heavily drawn from some Bantu language(s). It is therefore not a creole language, as it is sometimes considered. In contrast to Vogt and Fry (1996), Álvarez López and Jon-And (2017) suggests that when speakers code-switch from Cafundó Portuguese to Cupópia, they produce something different from a contemporary regional variety of Portuguese with a number of African-derived words. Rather, the passages in which Cupópia is used comprise specific grammatical features, suggesting that the variety has its own grammar.

== History ==
The name cafundó means "a remote place" or "a hard-to-reach place", referring to the quilombo of Cafundó. The Brazilian film Cafundó also takes its name from the same location.

== Speakers ==
The speaker community is very small (40 people in 1978). They live in a rural area, 150 km from the city of São Paulo, and are mostly of African descent. They also speak Portuguese, and use cafundó as a "secret" home language.
