= Toba Qom language =

Guaicuruan language of northern Argentina

Toba
- Qom la'aqtaqa
- Native to: Argentina, Paraguay, Bolivia
- Ethnicity: Toba
- Native speakers: 31,580 (2011)
- Language family: Guaicuruan: Southern; Toba

Official status
- Recognised minority language in: Argentina: Chaco Province

Language codes
- ISO 639-3: tob
- Glottolog: toba1269
- ELP: Toba

Toba Qom is a Guaicuruan language spoken in South America by the Toba people. The language is known by a variety of names including Toba, Qom or Kom, Chaco Sur, Qom la'aqtaqa by its speakers, and Toba Sur. In Argentina, it is most widely dispersed in the eastern regions of the provinces of Formosa and Chaco, where the majority of the approximately 19,810 (2000 WCD) speakers reside. The language is distinct from Toba-Pilagá and Paraguayan Toba-Maskoy. There are also 146 Toba speakers in Bolivia where it is known as Qom and in Paraguay where it is also known as Qob or Toba-Qom.

In 2010, the province of Chaco in Argentina declared Qom as one of four provincial official languages alongside Spanish and the indigenous Moqoit and Wichí.

== Classification ==
There are seven linguistic families and two independent languages among the different indigenous languages in Chaco. The Toba language belongs to the Guaycurú family, together with Pilagá (Formosa province), Mocoví (south Chaco and north Santa Fe Province), and others. Nowadays, there is a dispute among linguists whether these can be considered individual languages, or different dialects due to their similarities and intelligibility. However, most of the indigenous languages in Chaco are not homogeneous. There are differences as regards sounds and vocabulary. Thus, speakers notice these differences and sometimes communication can be affected inside a community. This is partly due to the influence of other languages.

Even though most indigenous communities in Chaco are bilingual, since they speak their indigenous mother tongue and the official language of the country (Spanish, Portuguese or Paraguayan Guaraní), their indigenous languages can be considered endangered due to lack of transmission from generation to generation. Many indigenous people are moving more and more to urban areas and their jobs and social activities require the predominant language of the country in which they live.

Speakers consider themselves as 'Qom' and their language as qom l'aqtaqa (Qom language). Most of the Qom population live in the provinces of Chaco and Formosa, Argentina. There are also communities in Santa Fe, Rosario and Gran Buenos Aires. According to Klein 1978, there are three different dialectal varieties within the Toba Language: no'olxaxanaq in Pampa del Indio (Chaco), lañaxashec in Machagai (Chaco), and tacshec (Formosa).

== History ==
Many indigenous people from Chaco remained nomads until the nineteenth century. Their economy was based on hunting and gathering. They were organized in groups called bandas (Spanish: "bands"), made up of the union of large families. They formed larger groups called tribus (Spanish: "tribes"), based on their dialect variant, family ties and marriage. In the twentieth century, they were forced into labour and this caused them to be displaced to different areas. This is when they started adopting a sedentary lifestyle.

Old Toba appears to have been a different variety from modern Toba. It was recorded by the missionary Alonzo de Barcena in 1595 (published by Samuel A. Lafone Quevedo 1894–1896), with later sparse data recorded by Francisco de Aguirre in 1792, apparently from near Asunción, and a couple of small Jesuit missionary texts.

== Phonology ==
=== Consonants ===
	Bilabial	Alveolar	Palatal	Velar	Uvular	Glottal
Nasal	m	n	ɲ			
Plosive	p	t	t͡ʃ d͡ʒ	k ɡ	q ɢ	ʔ
Fricative		s	ʃ			h
Flap		ɾ				
Lateral		l	ʎ			
Semivowel	w		j			

- /p t k q/ can have aspirated allophones [pʰ tʰ kʰ qʰ] in word-initial position, and unreleased [p̚ t̚ k̚ q̚] in word-final position.
- Voiced stops /ɡ ɢ/ may also be heard as fricative [ɣ ʁ] sounds.
- Affricates /t͡ʃ d͡ʒ/ can also be heard as palatal stops [c ɟ].
- /n/ can be heard as [n̥] word-finally when preceded by a glottal stop /ʔ/.
- /ɾ/ is heard as a trill [r] when following a /t/.
- /w/ can be heard as a labiodental fricative [v], when preceding or following /i/.
- /s l n/ can also have tense allophones as [sː lː nː].

=== Vowels ===
	Front	Central	Back
Close	i iː		
Mid	e eː		o oː
Open		a aː	

Phonetic allophones
Phoneme	Allophones
/i/	[i], [ɪ]
/e/	[e], [ɛ], [ɨ]
/eː/	[eː], [ɛː]
/o/	[o], [ɔ]
/a/	[a], [ã], [ə]

- A nasalized [ã] occurs when preceded and followed by /h/.

== Grammar ==
After consulting with native speakers of Qom la'aqtaqa of the Chaco region in Argentina, more exactly in the department General Güemes in Fortín Lavalle, they explained that the vast majority of the following rules and examples contain grave mistakes. They suggested that the given examples could have been confused with other indigenous languages. Maybe the rules and words are ancient or only apply to a certain region of the area where Qom la'aqtaqa is spoken. To give an example, "woman" to them is 'alo and "man" is yale, the y containing an ~ like it is seen in the Spanish ñ.

=== Nouns ===
Some nouns can function as adjectives or nouns. E.g.:

- Man – Talé
- Woman – Aló
- Good or goodness – Noen
- Bad or badness – Scauen

Sometimes, the particle ta is added to the adjective in order to combine it with a pronoun:

- Good – Noen
- Me good – Ayen-noen-ta
- Bad – Scauen
- You bad – Alian- scauen-ta

Some other times, they are used indifferently, with or without the particle ta. Nouns usually do not have declinations and, therefore, both singular and plural nouns share the same endings. It is only through the verb and circumstancials in the sentence that case and number are known.

In addition, the particle quotarien means 'why' or 'for what cause, reason or motive': For God's sake – Dios quotarien

==== Superlative and Comparative Forms ====
To make the comparative form, the Qom people add the particle mano before a noun functioning as an adjective:

- Good – Noentá; Better – Mano-noentá
- Bad – Scauenta; Worse – Mano-scauenta
- Sick – Saygot; Sicker – Mano-saygot

For the superlative form, the particle mano is added before the adjective and the letter u goes after it:

- Good – Noenta; Very good – Noentaú
- The best – Mano-noentá-ú
- The worst – Mano-scauentq-ú
- The sickest – Mano-saygoth-desaú

=== Pronouns ===
In the Toba language, the following pronouns can be found:

Singular

- Ayén – I
- Ahan – you
- Edá – that one

Plural

- Comi – we
- Camí – you
- Mnavaso – these
- Edava – those

Pronouns, just like nouns, lack declinations:

- The bread is mine – Nadená ayén
- The arrow is mine – Tigná ayén

Place demonstrative pronouns are:

- Aña – here
- Dequeñá – from here
- Edá – there
- Dequedá – over there
- Meliuagé – where
- Massayge – where, through which way
- Mehuá – where to
- Meticage – from where

But to make questions, they say:

- Menagé – Where is it?
- Menagé Dios? – Where is God?
- Metaygé yiocti? – Which way did the dog take?
- Yritaygé enrayó? – Where did the horse go?

=== Verbs ===
This language does not have the verb 'to be' or perfective and imperfective aspect. So, in order to make a perfective sentence, there is subject-adjective agreement:

- I am good – Ayen noentá, which means 'I good'.
- You are bad – Ahan scauentá, which means 'you bad'.
- The man is sick – Yalé saygoth, which means, 'the man sick'.

The particle sa preceding any verb denotes negation:

- Sahayaten – I know
- Sasahayaten – I do not know
- Sauan – I see
- Sasauan – I do not see
- Sahayá – I hear
- Sasahayá – I do not hear

The first and second person pronouns are usually omitted:

- Siquehé – I eat
- Saic – I leave

Number and person are marked by different particles preceding or postponing the verb. Each verb behaves differently. For example, the second person is sometimes realized with the particle ma, majtia, aise, maj, etc.

Tenses are reduced to the following:

- Simple present tense of the Indicative mood
- Past tense of the Indicative mood
- Future time
- Infinitive
- Present Progressive

This is because time is not restricted to verb tenses, but it depends on the adverb that is postponed to the verb. In order to make sentences in the Present Progressive tense, the particles tapec or tápeyá must be added after the verb (they mark the verb in the progressive form). E.g.: I eating – illic tapec or tapeyá.

=== Prepositions ===
Some prepositions proceed the phrase, like guasigén, which means 'up' or 'on top of.' E.g.: On top of the house – Guasigén nohie.

Some others are postponed, such as lori (outside) and laloro (inside). E.g.: Inside and outside the house – Nohíe laloro, nohie lorí

=== Adverbs ===
There are adverbs of manner, place and time. The Toba language lacks adverbs that derive from adjectives, such as 'badly' and 'nicely', but they explain this by using adjectives. Instead of saying 'The boy did it nicely', they say ñocolca noenta (Nice boy), and instead of saying 'The man has behaved badly', they say Yahole scauen (Bad man).

They have the following adverbs of place:

- Idivagé – Where?
- Nenná – Here
- Naquedá – There
- Iditaigé – Where is it or where has it gone?
- Igamaditaygem – Where has it gone to?
- Igatíacagé – Where does it come from?
- Igadeaygé – Where do you go?
- Edá – There
- Idealagí cadeanoví – When did you arrive?

Time adverbs are the following:

- Comennetatá – in the morning
- Mavit – in the afternoon
- Nahagát – at midday
- Ñapé – at night
- Ninogoni – at sunset
- Ninogón sigem – at sunrise
- Yecahá – so
- Nagí – now
- Nagua ahositá – I go this year

== Numerals ==
The Tobas have only four basic numbers:

- One – Nathedac
- Only one – Nathedac colec
- Two – Cacayni or Nivoca
- Three – Cacaynilia
- Four – Nalotapegat

They count till ten by duplicating or triplicating the numbers:

- Five, or three and two – Nivoca cacaynilia
- Six, or two times three – Cacayni cacaynilia
- Seven, or one and two times three – Nathedac cacayni cacaynilia
- Eight, or two fours – Nivoca nalotapegat
- Nine, or two fours and one – Nivoca nalotapegat natedac

== Sample text ==
The following is a sample text in Toba Qom of Article 1 of the Universal Declaration of Human Rights:

Toba Qom:

'Enauac na naaxat shiỹaxauapi na mayipi huesochiguii qataq 'eeta'a't da l'amaqchic qataq da 'enec qataq ỹataqta ỹaỹate'n naua lataxaco qataq nua no'o'n nvilỹaxaco, qaq ỹoqo'oyi iuen da i 'oonolec ỹataqta itauan ichoxoden ca lỹa.

Translation:

All human beings are born free and equal in dignity and rights. They are endowed with reason and conscience and should act towards one another in a spirit of brotherhood.
