= Enxet language =

Mascoian language spoken in Paraguay

Enxet
- Southern Lengua
- Énxet nempeywa
- Pronunciation: [eːnɬet]
- Native to: Paraguay
- Region: Presidente Hayes
- Ethnicity: 5,840 Enxet Sur people (2002 census)
- Native speakers: 3,800 (2002 census)
- Language family: Mascoian: Enxet

Language codes
- ISO 639-3: enx
- Glottolog: sout2989
- ELP: Enxet Sur

Enxet, also known as Enxet Sur or Southern Lengua, is a language spoken by the Indigenous southern Enxet people of Presidente Hayes Department, Paraguay. It is one of twenty languages spoken by the wider Gran Chaco Amerindians of South America. Once considered a dialect of a broader language, known as Vowak or Powok, Enxet (Southern Lengua) and Enlhet (Northern Lengua) diverged as extensive differences between the two were realized.

== Classification ==
Enxet belongs to the Enlhet-Enenlhet (aka Mascoian) language family, a small family of languages spoken in the Paraguayan region of the South American Gran Chaco. Enxet is most closely related to its sister language Enlhet, based on some preliminary analysis, but a substantial historical analysis of the Enlhet-Enenlhet family has not yet been published.

== History ==
Enxet and Enlhet were once considered dialects of a single language known as Lengua. The Enxet language was first documented in the late nineteenth century by explorers from Spain.

== Language contents and structure ==
Enxet contains only three phonemic vowel qualities /e, a, o/, each requiring a certain length such to maximize distinction. Bilingual speakers of Spanish and Enxet purportedly utilize shorter spacing between vowels when speaking Enxet compared to Spanish.

== Phonology ==
=== Vowels ===
	Front	Central	Back
Mid	e eː		o oː
Open		a aː	

Phoneme	Allophone
/e/	[e], [i], [ɛ]
/o/	[o], [ʊ], [ɔ]

=== Consonants ===
		Labial	Alveolar	Palatal	Velar	Uvular	Glottal
Plosive		p	t	cʲ	k	q	ʔ
Affricate				tʃ			
Fricative			s				h
Nasal		m	n	ɲ	ŋ		
Lateral	approximant		l				
Lateral	fricative		ɬ				
Semivowel				j	w		

/cʲ/ can also be heard as a regular palatal stop [c] or a palatalized velar stop [kʲ] in free variation.
