= Mascoian languages =

Language family of Paraguay

Mascoian
- Lengua-Mascoy, Toba; Enlhet–Enenlhet
- Geographic distribution: Paraguay
- Linguistic classification: Mataco–Guaicuru ?: Mascoian
- Subdivisions: Lengua; Maskoy

Language codes
- Glottolog: leng1261

The Mascoian languages, also known as Enlhet–Enenlhet, Lengua–Mascoy, or Chaco languages, are a small, closely related language family of Paraguay.

== Languages ==
The languages are:

- Maskoy (Toba-Maskoy)
- Enxet (Southern Lengua)
- Enlhet (Northern Lengua)
- Kaskihá (Guaná)
- Sanapaná
- Angaité

Two spurious languages have been claimed in the literature: Emok and Maskoy Pidgin.

=== Jolkesky (2016) ===
Internal classification by Jolkesky (2016):

- Lengua-Maskoy
  - Lengua: Enlhet; Enxet
  - Maskoy
    - Maskoy, Southern: Angaite; Sanapana
    - Maskoy, Northern: Kaskiha; Maskoy
