= Aché language =

Language

Aché
- Guayakí
- Native to: Paraguay
- Region: Alto Paraná
- Ethnicity: Aché
- Native speakers: 910 (2012)
- Language family: Tupian: Tupí–Guaraní; Guaraní (I); Aché
- Dialects: Ache gatu; Ache wa; Ñacunday River Ache

Language codes
- ISO 639-3: guq
- Glottolog: ache1246
- ELP: Aché
- Linguasphere: 88-AAI-da
- Aché is classified as Definitely Endangered by the UNESCO Atlas of the World's Languages in Danger.

Aché, also known as Guayaki, is a Guarani language of Paraguay with three living dialects: Ache gatu, Ache wa, and Ñacunday River Ache. The Ñacunday River dialect has low mutual intelligibility with the other two dialects.

== Phonology ==
Aché vowels
	Front		Central		Back	
	oral	nasal	oral	nasal	oral	nasal
Close	i	ĩ	ɨ	ɨ̃	u	ũ
Mid	e	ẽ			o	õ
Open			a	ã		

- /ɨ ɨ̃/ are written ⟨y ỹ⟩.

Aché consonant phones
		Bilabial	Labio- dental	Alveolar	Palatal (-alveolar)	Velar	Glottal
Nasal		m		n	ɲ ⟨ñ⟩		
Plosive/ Affricate	voiceless	p		t	t͡ʃ ⟨ch⟩	k	ʔ ⟨’⟩
Plosive/ Affricate	voiced	b		d	d͡ʒ ⟨dj⟩	ɡ	
Plosive/ Affricate	prenasal	ᵐb ⟨mb⟩		ⁿd ⟨nd⟩	ⁿd͡ʒ ⟨ndj⟩	ᵑɡ ⟨ng⟩	
Continuant	voiceless	ɸ ⟨f⟩					
Continuant	voiced	β ⟨v⟩	v	ɾ ⟨r⟩	j ⟨ll⟩	w	

== Bibliography ==
- Roessler, Eva-Maria (2008). Aspectos da gramatica ache: descrição e reflexão sobre uma hipotese de contato (Master's dissertation) (in Portuguese). Campinas: Universidade Estadual de Campinas, Instituto de Estudos da Linguagem. doi:10.47749/T/UNICAMP.2008.434677.
