= Angaité language =

Mascoian language spoken in Paraguay

Angaité
- Enenlhet
- Native to: Paraguay
- Ethnicity: 3,700 Angaité people (2002 census)
- Native speakers: 1,000 (2002 census)
- Language family: Mascoian: Angaité

Language codes
- ISO 639-3: aqt
- Glottolog: anga1316
- ELP: Angaité

Angaité is a language of the Paraguayan Chaco. Many children speak only Guarani, but may understand Angaité.
