= Sanapaná language =

Language in Paraguay

Sanapaná
- Sanapana payvoma
- Native to: Paraguay
- Ethnicity: 2,270 Sanapaná people (2002 census)
- Native speakers: 980 (2007)
- Language family: Mascoian: Sanapaná

Language codes
- ISO 639-3: spn
- Glottolog: sana1298
- ELP: Sanapaná

Sanapana (sanapana payvoma) is a Mascoian language of the Paraguayan Chaco, spoken by the Sanapaná people. The language is not critically endangered, as children are still learning it.

== Status ==
Sanapana is spoken by around half of all Sanapana people, who call themselves nenlhet, and is still being transmitted to children in the two largest communities, La Esperanza and Anaconda, who grow up monolingual in Sanapana before they go to school, where they learn Spanish. The language is also reported to be in everyday use, including in religious contexts.

== Classification ==
Sanapana is classified as a member of the Mascoian (Enlhet-Enenlhet) languages, distributed in the Gran Chaco region. They are considered to have evolved from a dialect continuum.

== Phonology and orthography ==
Sanapana has three vowels and 13 consonants.

=== Vowels ===
	Front	Central	Back
Mid	e		o
Open		a	

The two mid vowels can be raised in certain phonetic environments, but no minimal pairs, words differing in only one phoneme, are known to contrast getween high and mid vowels. The status of vowel length is uncertain, as no minimal pairs exist for this contrast, although certain words have consistently lengthened vowels (e.g. pesaːsep 'night'), and others consistently without (e.g. kelasma 'fish'). Vowels are written as in Spanish.

=== Consonants ===
Orthographical equivalents are written in ⟨angle brackets⟩.

	Labial	Alveolar	Palatal	Velar	Labiovelar	Glottal
Plosive	p	t		k		ʔ ⟨’⟩
Nasal	m	n		ŋ ⟨ng⟩		
Fricative		s				h
Lateral		ɬ ⟨hl⟩				
Approximant		l	j ⟨y, i⟩		w ⟨v, u⟩	

Long phonemes are written doubled. The sequence /kh/ is "often" written as ⟨h⟩. Gomes (2013) analyzes /ŋ/ as an allophone of /n/ before a velar phoneme, and posits /ɲ/ as a phoneme, rather than as a sequence of /n/ followed by /j/.

== Morphology ==
=== Noun ===
Sanapana noun morphology is simple in comparison with that of the verb. Nouns are frequently used as bare stems without any additional morphemes.

ja:met-atkok aʔ-jetn-ema neteŋ mésa (Note: Spanish loanword)
branch-DIM 2/3-lie-INF top table
'The small branch is lying on top of the table.'
