= Kaskihá language =

Language of Paraguay

Kaskihá
- Guaná
- Vana peema
- Native to: Paraguay
- Region: Alto Paraguay
- Ethnicity: 84 (2007)
- Native speakers: 28 (2007)
- Language family: Mascoian: Kaskihá

Language codes
- ISO 639-3: gva
- Glottolog: guan1268
- ELP: Guana (Paraguay)

Kaskihá (Cashquiha) is a language of the Paraguayan Chaco. It is one of several that go by the generic name Guaná.
