= Enlhet language =

Language of Paraguay

Enlhet
- Northern Lengua
- Enlhet
- Pronunciation: [enɬet]
- Native to: Paraguay
- Region: Presidente Hayes
- Ethnicity: 7,220 Enxet people (2002 census)
- Native speakers: 6,400 (2002 census)
- Language family: Mascoian: Enlhet

Language codes
- ISO 639-3: enl
- Glottolog: nort2971
- ELP: Enlhet Norte

Enlhet (Eenlhit), or Northern Lengua, is a language of the Paraguayan Chaco, spoken by the northern Enxet people. It is also known as Vowak and Powok.

In Filadelfia (Paraguayan Chaco) there is an organization that advocates for Enlhet language.

== Phonology ==
=== Vowels ===
Three vowel sounds are noted phonemically as /a ɛ ɔ/.

Phoneme	Allophone
/a/	[a], [æ], [ɐ]
/ɛ/	[ɛ], [ə], [ɪ]
/ɔ/	[ɔ], [ʊ]

=== Consonants ===
		Labial	Alveolar	Palatal	Velar	Glottal
Plosive		p	t		k	ʔ
Fricative			s		x	h
Nasal	plain	m	n		ŋ	
Nasal	glottalized	mˀ	nˀ		ŋˀ	
Lateral	approximant		l			
Lateral	fricative		ɬ			
Semivowel	plain			j	w	
Semivowel	glottalized			jˀ	wˀ	

== See also ==
- Languages of Paraguay
