= Enxet =

Group of indigenous people in South America

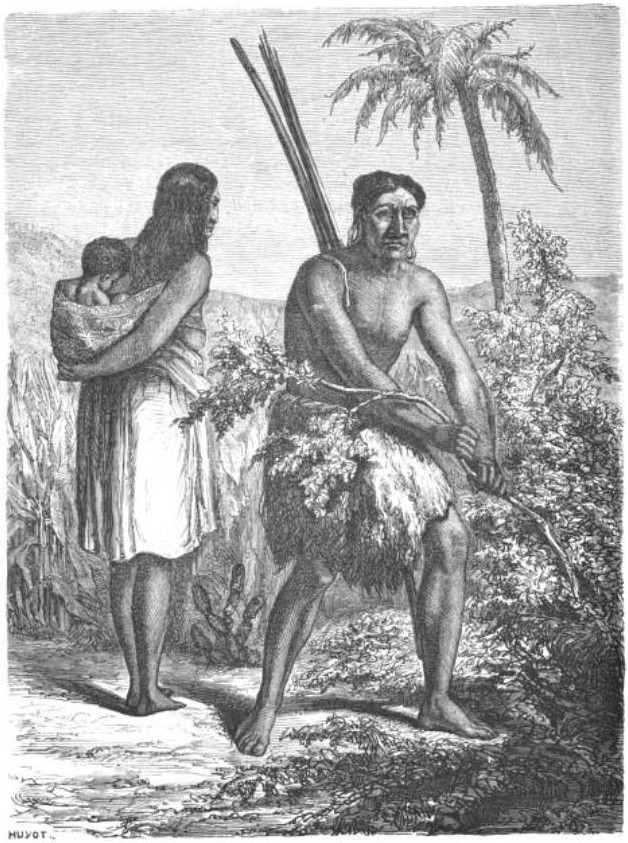
Enxet people in an engraving of 1861 published in Le Tour du Monde.

The Enxet are an Indigenous people of about 17,000 living in the Gran Chaco region of western Paraguay. Originally hunter-gatherers, many are now forced to supplement their livelihood as laborers on the cattle ranches that have encroached upon their dwindling natural forest habitat. Nevertheless, the Enxet are engaged in an ongoing conflict with the government and ranchers, who want to destroy what remains of the forest to open the land for massive settlement. Today, only a handful of Enxet still maintain their traditional way of life, while the majority live in small settlements sponsored by various missionary organizations. The Enxet and Enlhet languages are still vigorous.

== Land ownership ==
In 2006, 90 Enxet families, the Sawhoyamaxa, won a legal battle to 14,404 hectares of their traditional lands, bought up by Heribert Roedel. The land was signed over in 2011.

== Lingering Effects of the Chaco War on the Enxet People ==
The Enxet tribe suffered devastating blows during the Chaco War period (1932-1935). The Chaco War was fought between Bolivia and Paraguay over control of natural resources in the Chaco region of South America. The front of this war stretched directly through Chaco territory, ravaging ancestral lands and severely disrupting cultural way of life.

During the military colonization of Chaco, the Enxet verbal history was damaged, as members of the tribe were killed before sharing their history. To make matters worse, they were struck with a brutal smallpox epidemic in 1932, which resulted in the deaths of nearly half of the Enxet population. The Paraguayans also abused the Enxet natives, with a first hand Enxet report stating: "They {Paraguayans} wanted the women. If a man refused they would kill him, even if he was a leader. The Paraguayans had no qualms about shooting an Enxet." Though no conscription is overly reported, the Enxet population was targeted by both Bolivia and Paraguay due to fears revolving around the Natives being spies. This would lead to further devastation among the populace of the Chaco region.

In the aftermath of Paraguay's victory in the Chaco War, the government became more committed to settling and developing the Chaco. Subsequently, much of Enxet land would be divided, deforested, and given to cattle farmers. The deforestation coupled with the overgrazing of cattle left the land forever scarred. Today, the Enxet hold title to approximately 2.8 percent of the area they occupied before the start of the Chaco War. Their population has yet to recover, and is currently only about 8,200 strong.

=== Court case, water and other rights ===
The right to water was considered in the Inter-American Court of Human Rights case of the Sawhoyamaxa Indigenous Community v. Paraguay. The issues involved the state's failure to acknowledge indigenous communities' property rights over ancestral lands. In 1991, the state removed the indigenous Sawhoyamaxa community from the land resulting in their loss of access to water, food, schooling and health services. This fell within the scope of the American Convention on Human Rights; article 4, encroaching the right to life. Water is included in this right, as part of access to land. The courts required the lands to be returned, compensation provided, and basic goods and services to be implemented, while the community was in the process of having their lands returned.

=== Re-occupation ===
In 2013, the land still not being vacated, the Sawhoyamaxa re-occupied the land.

=== Supreme court ruling ===
In 2014 the Paraguay Supreme Court rejected a claim that government expropriation of the land (in order to transfer it to the Sawhoyamaxa), was unconstitutional.
