= Toba people =

Guaycuru ethnic group of northern Argentina

Toba
Qom-lik, Qom-lek, Kom, Tova, Emok
- Flag of the Toba people

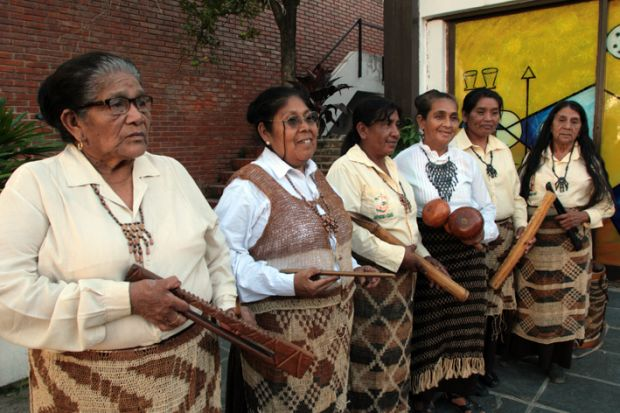
- Women choristers belonging to the Qom Chelaalapí Choir in Resistencia, Chaco

Total population
- Approximately 129,110

Regions with significant populations
- Argentina: 126,967
- Paraguay: 2,057
- Bolivia: 86

Languages
- Toba-Qom and Spanish

Related ethnic groups
- Guaicurua

The Toba people, also known as the Qom people, are one of the largest Indigenous groups in Argentina who historically inhabited the region known today as the Pampas of the Central Chaco. During the 16th century, the Qom inhabited a large part of what is today northern Argentina, in the current provinces of Salta, Chaco, Santiago del Estero, Formosa and the province of Gran Chaco in the southeast of the Department of Tarija in Bolivia (which the Qom have inhabited since the 20th century). Currently, many Toba, due to persecution in their rural ancestral regions, live in the suburbs of San Ramón de la Nueva Orán, Salta, Tartagal, Resistencia, Charata, Formosa, Rosario and Santa Fe and in Greater Buenos Aires. Nearly 130,000 people currently identify themselves as Toba or Qom. With more than 120,000 Qom living in Argentina, the Qom community is one of the largest Indigenous communities in the country.

Like most Indigenous groups in South America, the Qom have a long history of conflict and struggle following the arrival of the Spanish. While the Qom incorporated some aspects of European society into their culture, such as horseback riding, violent conflicts were fairly common. The Toba people, in particular, opposed the ideas of Christianity and the systems of forced labor that were imposed upon the Qom during the lives at Jesuit reductions. In some cases, attempts to assimilate the Toba people to Spanish society were accomplished with force and, when met with resistance from the Indigenous group, resulted in massacres such as the Massacre of Napalpí. In more recent history, the Qom have struggled with problems such as poverty, malnutrition, discrimination and tuberculosis due to a lack of support from the community and the inequalities they have endured.

In 2010, a historic protest for land rights developed in the province of Formosa when the government announced it would build a university on lands traditionally claimed by the Qom. After the Tobas' roadblock of National Route 86 was met with violence on behalf of the Argentine police, resulting in the death of one Toba man and one police officer, the protest sparked national controversy and attention. Led by chief Félix Díaz, the Qom community, joined by other Indigenous groups, began the Qopiwini organization and built an encampment in the middle of the city of Buenos Aires in order to continue protests and gain further recognition. While the protests have gained support from famous artists such as Gustavo Cordera, as well as international organizations such as Amnesty International and the Inter-American Commission on Human Rights, the Qom's struggle for land rights and the Formosa case is still developing.

== History ==
=== Early history ===
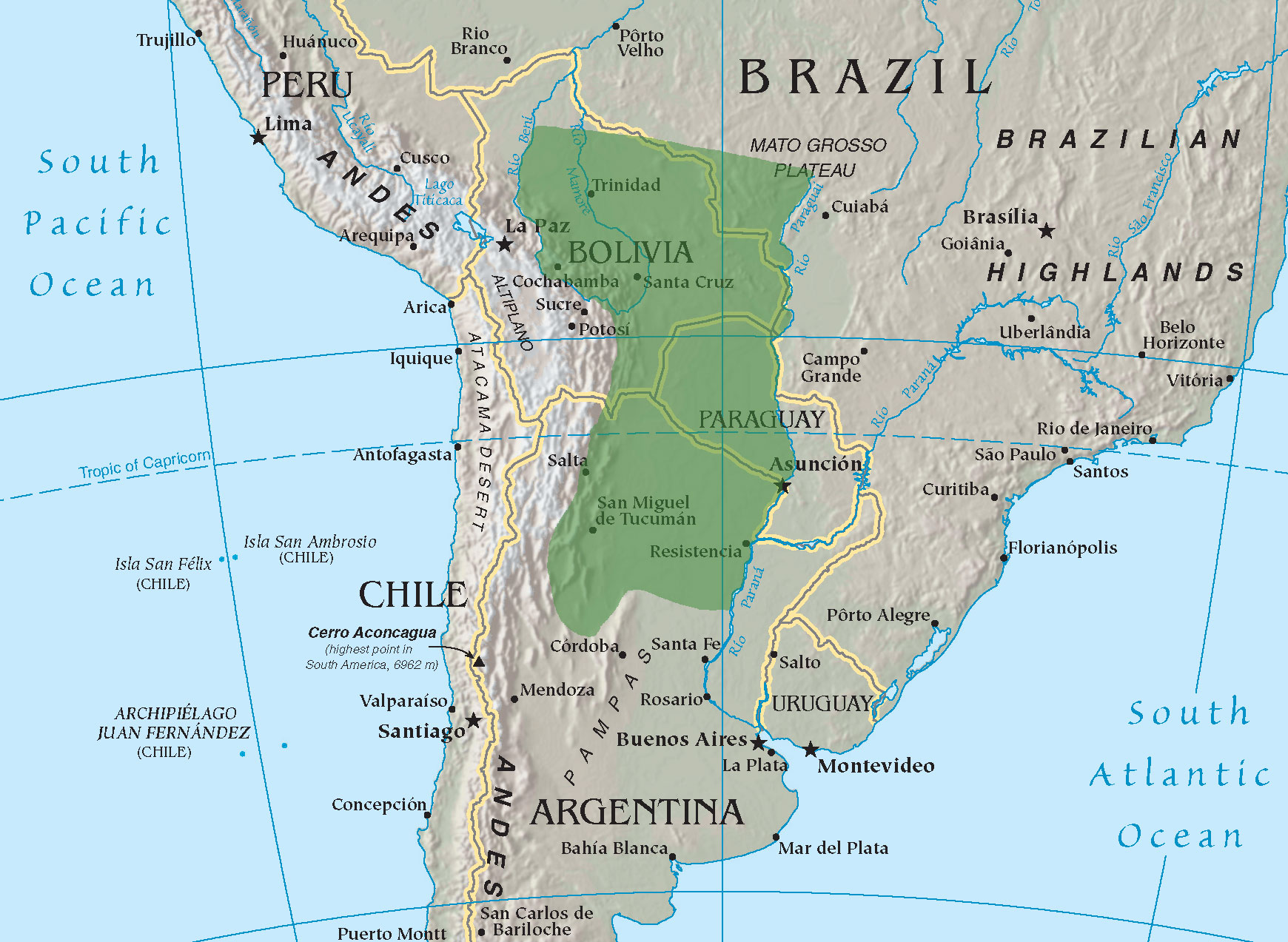
An approximate map of the Chaco region where the Qom would have historically inhabited.

At the time of the arrival of the Spanish in the 16th century, the Qom primarily inhabited the regions known today as Salta and Tarija and from there, Qom communities extended in territory until the Bermejo River and the Pilcomayo River, overlapping with other Indigenous communities. The large demographic growth of the Wichi put pressure on the Qom and forced them to displace themselves farther east, to the territories that they largely inhabit today. Traditionally, the Qom and the Mocoví peoples regarded each other as allies while the Abipon peoples were typically treated as enemies to the Qom.

Like other Guaycuru peoples, the Qom organize themselves into bands composed by up to 60 families that would establish relationships with other bands. The principal groups among the Toba were the sheu’l’ec who inhabited the northern or sheu region, the dapigueml’ec who inhabited the western or dapiguem region, the l’añagashec who inhabited the southeastern or l’añaga region, the tacshic who inhabited the eastern or tagueñi region and the qollaxal’ec who inhabited the southernmost region known as qollaxa.

=== Contact with Europeans ===
The first written record of Spanish interaction with the Qom appears at the beginning of the 1700s but no formal study of the Qom people was done until Father José Cardú, a Spanish Franciscan missionary, estimated that there were at least 4,000 Tobas living in the western or dapiguem region. The first missionaries to make contact with the Qom did not immediately try to introduce them to an agricultural lifestyle, an approach that was adopted in almost every other part of Latin America in order to "civilize" the Indigenous group. Instead, the limited resources and the difficulties presented by the landscape of the Chaco forced missionaries to accept the Qom's hunter-gatherer lifestyle as the only sustainable option. The presence of the Spanish resulted in a great revolution for the Qom, in part because the Qom encountered a new and powerful enemy and in part because the Spanish involuntarily provided the Qom with a great contribution to their culture: in the 17th century the Qom began to utilize horses and soon developed a powerful equestrian complex in the center and southern part of the Gran Chaco region, known as the Chaco Gualamba.

The Qom became competent horsemen despite the fact that their territory was in large part covered in woodlands forests. When riding their horses through the trees the Qom used to fasten pieces of leather to their heads in order to prevent injuries from the spines of the trees and attacks from jaguars and pumas that would jump from the tree branches to attack them. As enemies of the Paraguayan state, on nights of the full moon, the Qom and other neighboring guaycurú groups would cross the Paraguay River on horse in order to carry out raids. With the adoption of horseback riding, the Qom could extend the reach of their raids, transforming themselves into the dominant Indigenous group of the Central Chaco. Furthermore, their command of the horses permitted the Qom to advance further west and even conduct raids in the northeast zones that correspond to what is today known as the Pampas. From their horses, armed with bows and arrows, the Qom hunted not only Indigenous animals but also cattle that had been imported from Europe. While the horse played a revolutionary role in changing the way in which the Qom travelled and participated in hunts and raids, some historians believe that some bands of Qom maintained more traditional hunting methods. Here, the Qom would use horses to approach their targets but would dismount and stalk their prey on foot in order to avoid notice.

In 1756 the Jesuits founded the Toba reduction, San Ignacio de Ledesma, near the Ledesma fort in the province of Jujuy. At the time of the expulsion of the Jesuits from Latin America in 1768, there were 600 Qom living at the reduction.

The Qom became one of the most resistant Indigenous groups that opposed attempts at transculturation and usurpation of the white man in the Chaco region. Led by famous chiefs such as Tayolique, the Qom frequently used guns to oppose European intervention and continued to update their rifles in order to better defend themselves and their territory. In 1858, the Qom even threatened the city of Santa Fe. However, after 1880 they could not confront the Argentine Army that confined them to the so-called "Impenetrable Chaco", a densely forested area of the Chaco that was difficult to navigate and survive due to the scarcity of water.

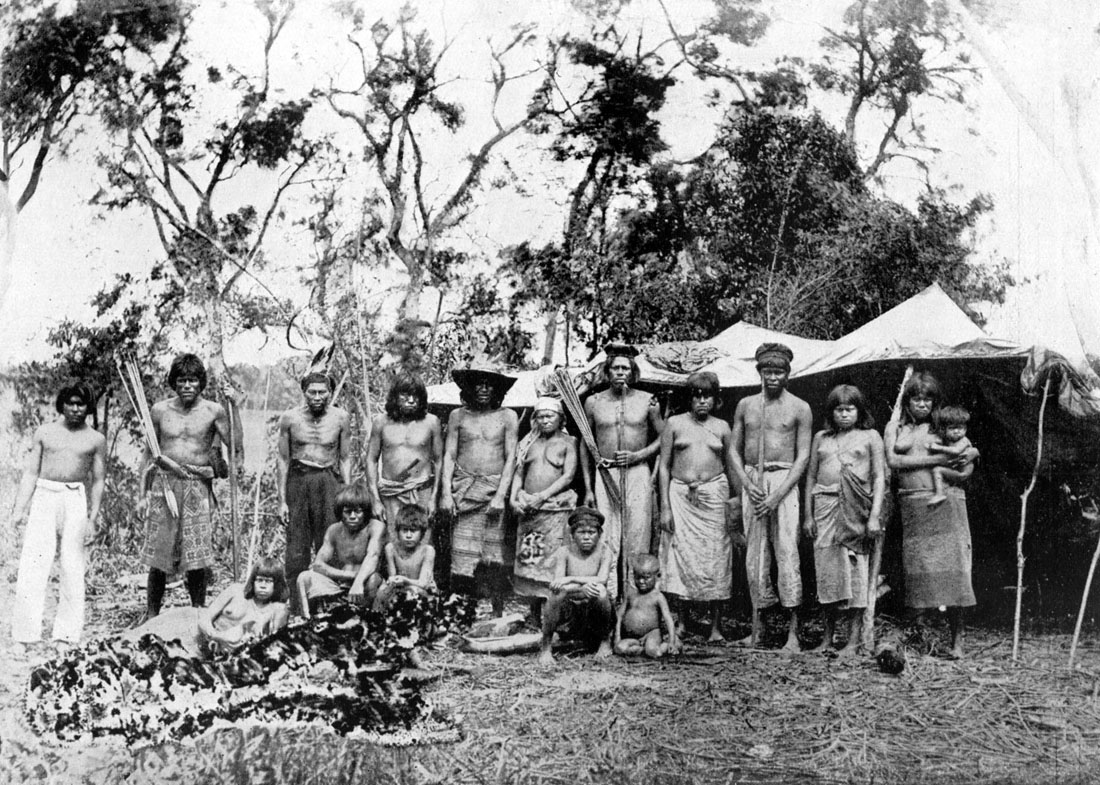
A group of Tobas near the Pilcomayo River, 1892.

In 1901, the government, led by Julio Argentino Roca, as well as Franciscan missionaries from the convent of San Carlos Borromeo of San Lorenzo in Santa Fe agreed to found two Indigenous reductions in the National Territory of Formosa. One of the missions, San Francisco Solano de Tacaaglé, was initiated by the Franciscan friar Terence Marcucci on March 21, 1901 with 150 Qom and Pilagá people largely coming from the northern Chaco in Paraguay. The mission occupied 20,000 hectares of land near the Pilcomayo River, inside of which the mission itself was moved various times. The second reduction, San Francisco de Laishí was founded with the Qom people on March 25, 1901 in the southeast region of Formosa by Father Serafín Iturralde and Father Ghio. This mission was composed of 74,000 hectares of land in which there was a sugar factory that operated until 1946. When Formosa became an official province in 1955, the two missions were given civil control, resulting in the towns of Misión Tacaaglé and San Francisco de Laishí.

The Indigenous people of the Gran Chaco, in general, maintained their sovereignty until the late 19th century. The conquest of the territory and the subjugation of their people during the Conquest of the Gran Chaco decimated the population. In the second half of the 20th century, when the Qom stopped working as agrarian labor, a massive expulsion of Indigenous people from the area resulted. The first conquest over the territories began in 1884 and is remembered as the Conquest of the Gran Chaco. One of the principal protagonists of this campaign was General Victorica. During this mission that began in 1911, General Victoria led his men into the Chaco region, ultimately ending a revolt led by the Qom in 1916. Afterwards, the Qom remained marginalized in the poorest areas and as a result of the reduction in the size of their territories, survival became even harder. In 1924, when the government led by Marcelo Torcuato de Alvear wanted to increase farming areas by giving land to foreigners and Creoles while concentrating the Qom on reservations, the Qom fought their last military resistance in the Indigenous Colony of Napalpí in the province of Chaco. This battle resulted in the death of 200 Qom, an event that is known as the Massacre of Napalpí. Many Qom were forced to work on cotton plantations or in manufacturing plants. On July 19, 1924, during the presidency of Marcelo T. de Alvear, 200 people from the Qom and Mocoví communities died at the hands of the Chaco police and estancia owners. More than 700 people were injured, including women, children and the elderly. Those who weren't killed by police gunfire had their throats slit with machetes and axes by the National Police troops, sent by Alvear. In 2022, Argentina opened a 'truth trial' about the Napalpí massacre, the first to look at persecution of Indigenous people in the country.

=== Recent history ===
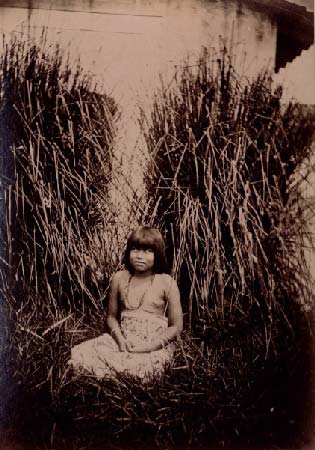
Image of a young Toba girl.

In 2006, the primary groups of the Qom were located in the western part of the province of Formosa, the center and eastern sections of the Chaco province and the northern part of the province of Santa Fe, as well as the Chaco Boreal in Paraguay. In Argentina, there are 69,462 registered Qom, with 59,800 members of the tribe who speak the Indigenous language. In Paraguay, there are around 700 Qom. In the western region of the province of Formosa, the Qom have mixed with the Pilagá community and are referred to as the Toba-Pilagá.

There is currently an intense internal migration of the Qom to Gran Rosario. There, the Qom gather especially densely in the neighborhood of Toba and in the northeastern part of the province of Santiago del Estero. Another settlement is found in the jurisdiction of La Plata in the province of Buenos Aires.

The Supplementary Survey of Indigenous Communities (Encuesta Complementaria de Pueblos Indígenas) 2004–2005, complementary to the Argentina's National Census of 2001 recognized 69,452 people living in Argentina as Qom or first-generation Qom descendants, of which 47,591 lived in the provinces of Chaco, Formosa and Santa Fe, 14,466 lived in the city of Buenos Aires, 24 in the province of Buenos Aires and 7,395 in the rest of the country.

The National Census of 2010 in Argentina revealed that 126,967 people self-identified as Qom in the country. A breakdown of the survey results showed that 35,544 lived in Gran Buenos Aires, 30,766 in the province of Chaco, 13,475 in the province of Buenos Aires, 12,246 in Formosa, 4,117 in Córdoba, 3,845 in the city of Buenos Aires, 3,427 in the province of Salta, 1,630 in the province of Entre Ríos, 947 in Santiago del Estero, 928 in Mendoza, 927 in Tucumán, 905 in Corrientes, 681 in Chubut, 419 in Catamarca, 221 in Tierra del Fuego, 210 in La Rioja, 209 in Neuquén, 189 in La Pampa and 157 in Santa Cruz.

The economic situation for the majority of the Qom is precarious. Many Qom live in areas associated with poverty, or in Argentine slum communities known as villas miserias. Members of the Qom community who maintain their ancestral lands live in rural communities regulated by neighboring commissions, community association or run by traditional leaders, sometimes referred to as caciques. There are some positive indicators such as the fact that 1000 hectares of land were donated to the Qom. This land was used to build houses, supply potable water and establish new bilingual schools were children learn their ancestral history and receive instruction about their culinary traditions.

Today, the Qom suffer from a lack of adequate medical care, seen in January 2015 when many Qom died of malnutrition and Tuberculosis. During Roy Nikisch's time as governor, the situation with the Qom in the province of Chaco was declared a "true humanitarian emergency" by senator Rosa Chiquichano and legislation was passed to confirm the humanitarian situation after dozens of Qom died due to a lack of nutrition. The bishop of Resistencia, the capital of Chaco, arrived to ask for intervention on behalf of the governor when ten Indigenous people also died due to a lack of proper nutrition. In 2015, the death of Néstor Femenia, a seven year old Qom child, gained national attention when the child died of multi-organ failure as a result from complications stemming from malnutrition and tuberculosis. The government has recently built two new hospitals, Laguna Blanca and Hospital El Espinillo, in Qom communities in the province of Formosa. Laguna Blanca is located 15 kilometers from Argentina's border with Paraguay and about 2000 kilometers from the capital of Formosa. The Nam Center for Primary Health Care for Qom, located on National Route 11 in the city of Formosa, was also established in an attempt to provide better healthcare for Qom people.

=== Land protests ===
From 2008 to the present, the Qom have participated in a series of protests, in both the province of Formosa as well as the city of Buenos Aires, in order to raise awareness of the discrimination the group has encountered and demand rights to their traditional lands that are guaranteed by the Argentine Constitution.

==== Roadblock of Route 86 ====
Since 2008, many Indigenous people have joined the "Movimiento Nacional Campesino Indígena" (National Movement of Indigenous Peasants) and fight for the legal right to their land and against agribusiness. In 2010 this movement became especially powerful when the governor of Formosa, Gildo Insfrán, began to push for the construction of the University Institute of Formosa as part of the National University of Formosa, near the Pilcomayo National Forest. However, the La Primavera Qom Community alleges they possess the title to land, which resulted in territorial conflicts when construction began.

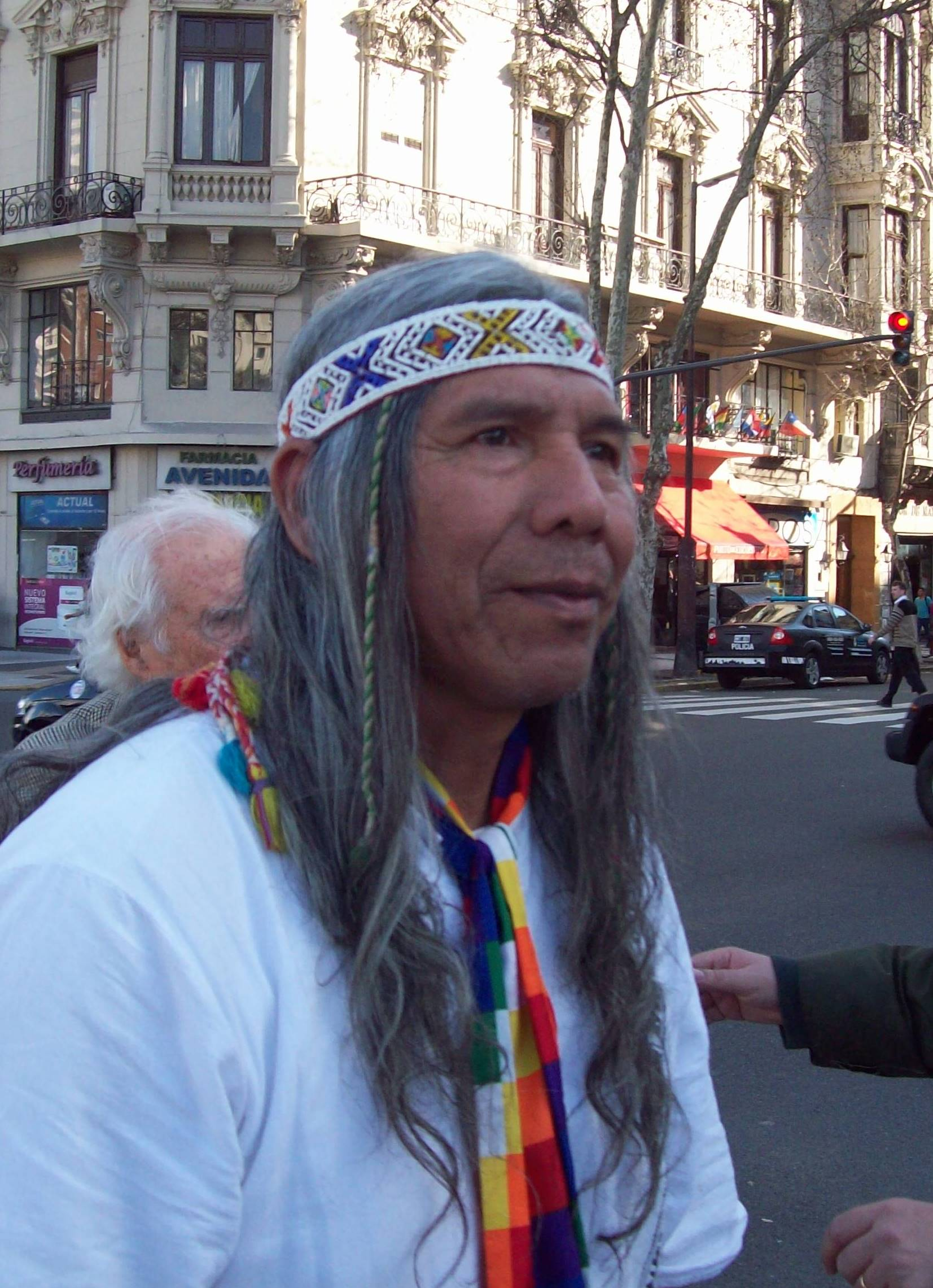
Félix Díaz, a Qom leader.

Felix Díaz, a Qom leader, along with other Qom, decided to cut off the National Route 86 in Argentina in order to protest construction of the University Institute. The Qom claim that the Argentine Constitution establishes that Indigenous communities have the right to their ancestral lands, as does the United Nations Declaration on the Rights of Indigenous Peoples which acknowledges the relationship between these communities and their lands. Throughout this period, there were incidents of shootings and accusations of aggression towards both the Qom and the police. As a result of the protests, construction of the University Institute was suspended awaiting a decision from the Argentine National Supreme Court of Justice.

On November 23, the situation deteriorated when police were called in to forcibly disband the protest. The police burned down temporary shelters built alongside the road and violence erupted, resulting in the arrest of nearly 30 people, including some children. The same day, the Celía family would also come forward to claim the lands in question, bringing police with them to enforce their claim. By the end of the night, two people, a policeman as well as a Qom man named Roberto López, had been killed and several others were hospitalized due to the conflict. Díaz and other Qom protestors were even shot at by both the police and supporters of the Celía family. As a result of the violent events that occurred on November 23, Díaz, as well as 23 other members of the Qom community, were accused of crimes of illegal occupation and usurpation of land and became involved in criminal proceedings against them. In order to further protests and raise awareness of these incidents, Díaz and other Qom moved their protest to the city of Buenos Aires. However, no public or governmental entity received the Qom other than Florencio Randazzo, an Argentine politician who worked as the Minister of the Interior from 2007 to 2015. Díaz was also received by Pope Francis who was concerned over the severity of the incidents. Despite this, threats towards the Qom community did not stop.

The Supreme Court planned a public forum for March 7, 2012, in which all parties involved could come and express their positions. Members of the provincial government, officials from the Institute for Indigenous Affairs, CELS (the Center for Legal and Social Studies), and Felix Díaz, who served as a representative of the Qom community, were all invited. Stella Maris Zabala de Copes, the district attorney for the province of Formosa would attend the forum in place of the governor of Formosa. The two primary issues discussed during the forum were the controversy over land rights and the increasing acts of violence towards Indigenous members. In August 2012, concern for violence towards Indigenous members was especially apparent after Díaz was run over by a truck while traveling on his motorcycle. According to witnesses, the vehicle that ran over Díaz was owned by the same Celía family that had also claimed land in Formosa.

Defense attorneys for Díaz and CELS argued that the district attorney's office refused to listen to evidence presented by Díaz and instead only listened to testimonies brought forward by the police. In April 2012, the charges against Díaz and the other 23 Qom members were dismissed due to a lack of evidence. In November, the Chamber of Appeals for Resistance withdrew charges against Díaz and Amanda Asikak. The judges stated that the roadblock of the National Route 86 was the only measure the Indigenous group had at their disposition in order to protest the construction of the National Institute. However, the Penal Council ordered that the investigation continue into Díaz's supposed violent acts that occurred November 23. Despite orders to continue investigating the events of November 23, the court has never investigated the attacks perpetrated against Díaz and his community. The Inter-American Commission on Human Rights asked Argentine authorities to take measures in order to guarantee security and safety for Félix Díaz and his family. Due to the increased police presence, other threats against the community were observed.

In 2012, while Díaz travelled along the intersection of Route 2 and Route 86, he was hit by an all-terrain vehicle (known commonly as a 4x4). The vehicle then fled the scene. The vehicle that caused the accident was recognized by inhabitants of the area as that of the Celía family, who besides being close friends to government officials in Formosa, had already been accused of a previous attack against Díaz during the roadblock of the Route 86. After the incident gained public attention, Díaz was moved to an intensive therapy program and would publicly claim that the incident was an attack against his life and a direct result of the Qom's land dispute.

Over the next year, several Qom would be killed in car accidents along the Route 86, a result of what many Indigenous members claimed to be homicide. In January 2013, Juan Daniel Asijak, the 16-year-old nephew of Díaz, died in an accident on Route 86. He had been hit with a piece of oxidized iron that did not seem to be a result of the accident and could not be explained as belonging to the car or any nearby structures. The same month, Imer Ilbercio Flores, a young Qom child, was killed in a car accident in Villa Río Bermejito, in the province of Chaco. A month before, a similar accident had occurred when a truck charged a motorcycle driven by a Qom woman named Celestina Jara, resulting in her death and that of her granddaughter Lila Coyipé.

==== Qopiwini and Buenos Aires protests ====
By the end of February, 2015, the Qom, Pilagá, Wichi and Nivaclé communities (grouped together under the Qopiwini organization) established a camp at the intersection of the Avenida 9 de Julio and Avenida de Mayo in the city of Buenos Aires. Here, they hoped to denounce the actions taken by the government of Formosa and obtain more signatures of those who supported their land claim. Díaz also claimed that the government had not cooperated with any of the previously established treaties during the past four years that would protect the different communities. Amnesty International asked the Argentine government protect and ensure the physical safety of the communities. The camp gained international attention, including that of The Guardian and other famous news groups. In April, the camp suffered an attack when a person on board a motorcycle threw a Molotov cocktail into one of the camp tents and at nearly the same time, various unidentified people in the state of Formosa broke into the Qom Radio Station, FM 89.3, and destroyed much of the equipment. On July 1, 2015, more than one hundred members of the Federal Police surrounded the campsite. Díaz met with one of the deputies and was presented with an order of eviction. In September, Gustavo Cordera, a famous Argentine musician, visited the campsite and expressed public support for the Qom cause. Additionally, Cordera and Díaz made an appearance on the TV show Intratables, a program that analyzes the most important and controversial news stories.

On November 3, 2015, Mauricio Macri, at the time a presidential candidate for the Cambiemos political coalition, visited the campsite and interviewed Díaz. Marco signed an act of compromise, promising to comply with several of the Indigenous communities' demands should he win the ballotage on November 22. According to Díaz, Macri never asked for votes or support in exchange for his cooperation. Instead, Macri signed the act in order to promote Indigenous rights. Díaz publicly asked Daniel Scioli, the other presidential candidate, to visit the campsite and meet with leaders but this ultimately never happened.

==== Qom protests under Macri administration ====
With the knowledge that Mauricio Macri had won the presidency, the Qom and other Indigenous groups from the Qopiwini were able to have an interview with Claudio Avruj, the secretary for Human Rights, who confirmed that the new government would issue a response to the Indigenous groups' claims. Following this interview on Tuesday, December 1, the Qopiwini announced in a press conference that they would be clearing the campsite on December 6. One of the reasons given for the abandonment of the campsite was the fear of further attacks on the campsite by supporters of former president Cristina Fernández Kirchner on December 10, the day of Macri's inauguration, given that attacks had already been perpetrated by pro-Kirchner supporters.

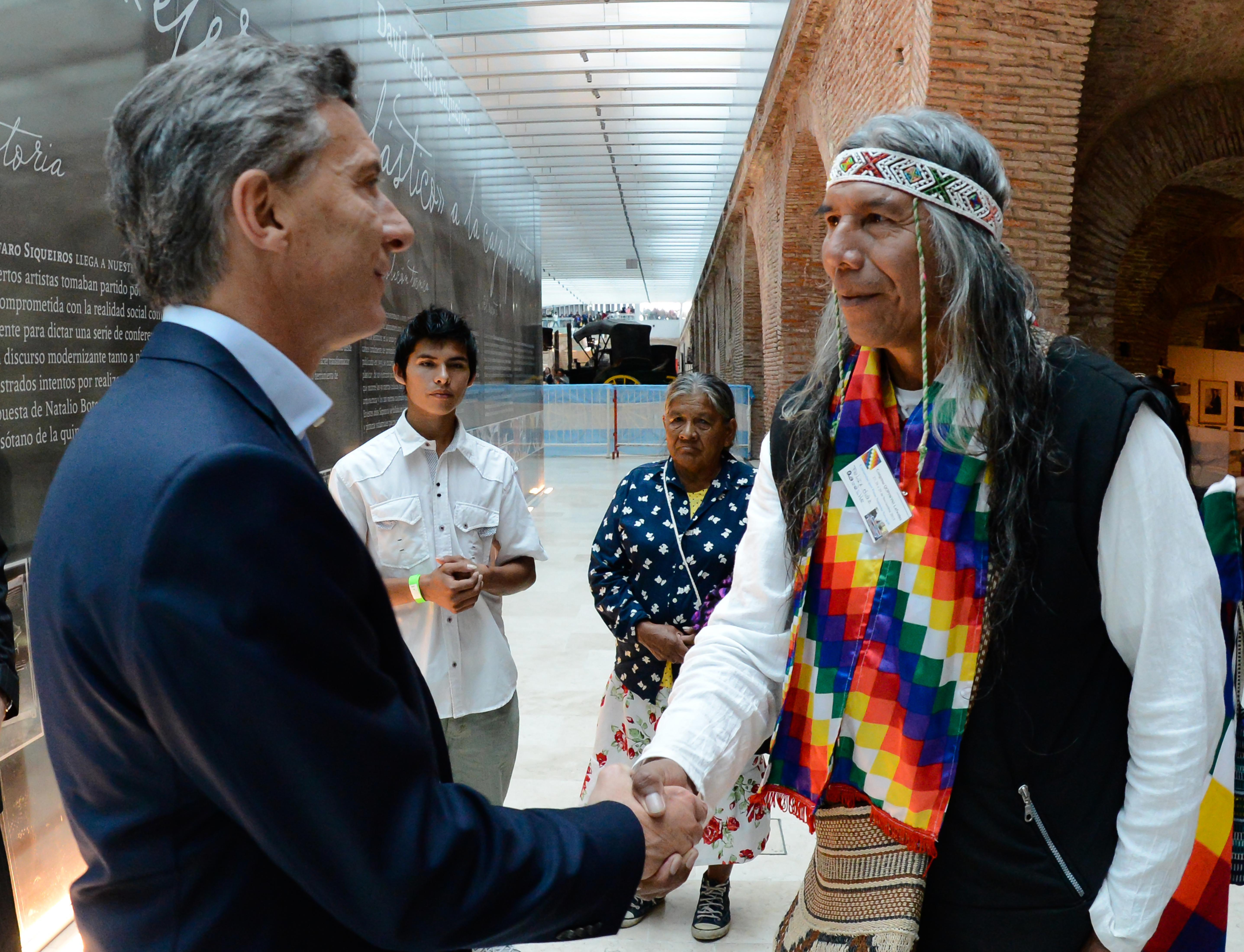
Félix Díaz meets with Argentina President, Mauricio Macri.

On December 17, a week after officially being recognized as the President of Argentina, Macri held talks with Díaz and other Indigenous leaders such as Relmu Ñamku. In February 2016, it was rumored that Díaz could be chosen to serve as president of the National Institute of Indigenous Affairs (INAI). This rumor was confirmed by Relmu Ñamku, one of those present during initial talks between Díaz and Macri. However, Raúl Eduardo Rudiaz was assigned as president of the institute instead. In an interview, Díaz confirmed that one of the points of the agreement that had been signed by Macri was that the INAI be presided over by an Indigenous person. Despite the seeming lack of progress, Díaz continued to express hope that Macri would abide by the compromise act he had signed.

Díaz, together with other Indigenous communities, returned to Buenos Aires on March 15, 2016 to rebuild the camp and raise awareness of the struggles of Indigenous communities once again. However, this time, the Indigenous communities decided to set up camp in the former Navy Petty-Officers School of Mechanics, a controversial site that had once been used as a clandestine detention center for the disappearance and torture of political prisoners during the Argentine military dictatorship, and known popularly as the ex-ESMA. The Qom and other communities hoped that by protesting in this historically important site, they would gain more attention and ultimately be received by the Secretary of Human Rights, Claudio Avruj. At the end of March, the Department of Human Rights proposed the creation of a process of Consultative and Participative Advice of Indigenous Peoples (Consejo Consultivo y Participativo de los Pueblos Indígenas) which had been formed and supported by various Indigenous leaders. Claudio Avruj, the secretary of Human Rights, affirmed that the agreement had been the result of meetings of the Council of Work and Dialogue between Indigenous Peoples and the National Government. Avruj also stated that Díaz promised to dismantle the campsite at the ex-ESMA provided that the government continued to consult Indigenous communities and move forward with Macri's previously signed compromise.

On July 15, 2016, the Consultative and Participative Advice of Indigenous Peoples program was officially created. During the next two days, nearly 300 Indigenous community members and leaders attended meetings and debates in order to establish internal rules and design an executive commission within the program. Relmu Ñamku was designated Secretary General while Félix Díaz was chosen as president of the organization. Besides these two leaders, four vice-presidents were selected in order to represent the four historic regions of Argentina: Faustino Lencina in Central Argentina, Jorge Palomo in Northeast Argentina, Margarita Mamani and Rolando Flores in Northwest Argentina and Rubén Huanque in Southern Argentina.

== Culture ==
=== Language ===
The language of the Qom is referred to as qom l’aqtac and from a linguistic point of view, it is assumed to belong to the Guaicuruan language group that many authors consider that, along with the Matacoana languages that form the mataco-guaicuruan linguistic family. In the Toba Qom language, the Qom originally referred to themselves as the ntokóit, but since the end of the 20th century, this Indigenous group began to utilize the self-given name, Qom, that is derived from the personal pronoun qomi, meaning we. In a restricted sense, this name refers only to the Qom people and in a more ample context, it can refer to all Indigenous groups. Also, although less frequently, the Qom refer to themselves as the qom’lek or qom’lik. Despite being an Indigenous group from the Pampas region and not from the Andean region, since the 1980s, it is common to see the word written as qom where the "q" denotes a voiceless uvular stop that appears in Andean languages such as Quechua and Aimara and sounds similar to a "k".

As it commonly occurs in the spelling of Indigenous names, there are many variations in spelling for Indigenous words. "Toba" is an initially pejorative name of Guarani origin, but it is of ample use among the Qom themselves, in the self-naming of their communities and in the national census of Argentina. The name tová (forehead) came to be as a result of the idea that the Qom, according to some sources, used to shave the hair off of the front part of their scalps. Other sources attribute it to a custom, not currently practiced, of removing the hair from one's eyebrows. For these motives, the Spanish from Asuncion, called them frentones (meaning large forehead, a name also given to the Abipón people and the Guaicurues) following the first encounter between the two groups in the 16th century. The generalization of the toba name did not occur among the Qom themselves until the beginning of the 18th century.

In Paraguay, this group also used to call themselves the emok, a term in the Enlhet language that means friend or countrymen.

As of 2007, there were an estimated 40,000 people who spoke Toba Qom as native speakers. In 2010, the province of Chaco in Argentina recognized Toba Qom as one of the official languages of the province in addition to Spanish, Wichi and Moqoit.

=== Religion ===
The Qom's system of beliefs have been classified as animistic and shamanistic. The Qom worship all natural beings and possess a belief in a supreme being. The Qom maintain this religious system through oral traditions and transmission of their beliefs. Traditionally, the Qom built tamnaGaikí that served as prayer huts where all members of Qom society were welcome to gather and pray together. In any case, even today, a large part of the Qom population turn to shamans or pio’oxonak who act as healers. Traditional medicine practiced by healers and shamans places a special emphasis on the use of animals—and especially animal fat—in the form of zootherapy. Studies show that Qom shamans have nearly 200 medicinal uses for almost 75 different species of animals, including birds, insects, reptiles and mollusks. While most of the animals used for medicinal purposes are native to the Chaco region, Qom shamans have also incorporated the medicinal use non-native species such as horses and bees. One possible explanation for the Qom's reverence of the use of animals in their medicine is seen through their animistic religious beliefs where animals were believed to have been gods and the original creators of the lands. In addition to their important role as spiritual leaders and healers, Qom shamans also serve as political leaders and as counselors to a band's chief.

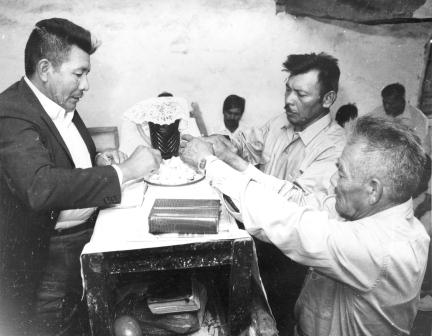
Communion at Misión Laishí

During colonization, Jesuit and Franciscan missionaries viewed the Qom's religious beliefs as being inspired by the Devil, claiming that shamans, in particular, were weapons of Satan that prevented the successful evangelization of the Qom. Before the acceptance of Christianity, infanticide was frequent among the Qom, a custom that was a result of the scarcity of food and other resources that the Qom historically suffered. In return, the children who survived were treated with special dedication and affection.

Today, most Qom have adopted Christianity. While the Qom practice a variety of different sects of Christianity, Anglican and Pentecostal groups are especially prevalent given that many shamans converted to Protestant priests. Unfortunately, inequalities among the Qom do exist as a result of religious beliefs, especially between Anglicans and those who maintain traditional beliefs and practices. Here, many Anglican practitioners look down upon traditional religious practices and beliefs as well as ancient Qom society as a whole, believing that it represents a period in which the Qom were not civilized or developed people.

=== Traditional clothing ===
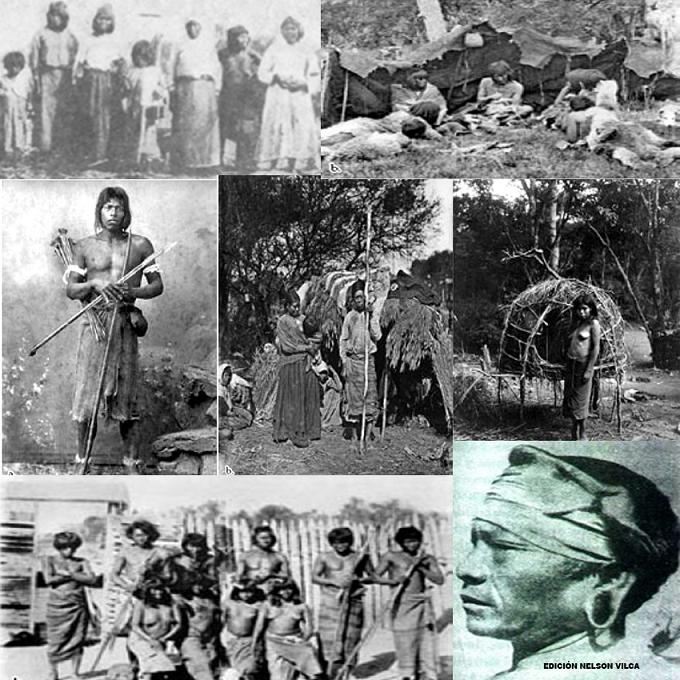
A collage of images showing Qom people in their traditional clothing.

Qom culture, with respect to their customs and traditions, is very efficient and functional in design. The Qom lived in log shelters covered in straw with living spaces that measured some two meters in diameter. The Qom made ceramic objects, wove baskets and knit clothes for mostly utilitarian purposes.

During the warmest months, the Qom used almost no clothing, with the exception of simple loincloths. In the cooler months, the Qom used more complex clothing and on occasions such as ritual celebrations, the Qom adorned themselves elaborately. Here, they wore dresses called potos prepared with fibers from the Achmea distichantha plant also known as the Brazilian vaseplant, as well as leather and cotton, following the arrival of the Spanish.

During the coldest months of the year, the Qom wrapped themselves in ponchos. Adult males adorned their heads with the opaga, a headdress made from feathers and cords made from the vase plant. Women and younger men decorated themselves with onguaghachik: bracelets originally made using teeth and claws from animals, seeds, feathers, shells and cochleas. It appears that the Qom obtained many of these elements through a system of barter and trade with other Indigenous groups. Necklaces called colaq were also worn and made using similar items to the onguaghachik. Another item, known as the nallaghachik were eminently festive accessories that were brightly colored and made using feathers, flowers and leaves.

=== Gender roles ===
While there is a strict division of labor among the Qom, men and women are considered equally important and respected in social and political terms. Traditionally, a man's primary job within the tribe was to hunt while women primarily worked as gatherers and maintained small plots of vegetables. Both jobs were considered equally important among the Qom and there was no discrimination between genders. The only role in society that did not have an equivalent role for the opposite gender was that of the warrior. For the Qom, only men were permitted to actively participate in raids and battles as warriors although women were frequently involved in the aftermath. Even before the raids, women were not allowed to participate in rituals such as the Dance of Courage, in order to ensure that the warriors were focused and ready for war. Following the event, women often divided the winnings of the battle or raid, splitting up the resources received and finding families to raise children from foreign tribes that were taken prisoner. In the aftermath of victory, the Qom would participate in the Dance of the Scalps in which everyone celebrated, indulging in fermented, alcoholic beverages. However, as part of their duties, women did not drink and had to remain sober in order to prevent and de-escalate any quarrels that might result and act as mediators.

Another difference in gender roles among the Qom appears in the way in which men and women display aggression. Traditionally, men would not engage in physical violence using their fists or weapons to hurt one another but rather would fight through a series of challenges to determine who was stronger. In the case that physical fighting did break out, other men would not interfere. In fact, only the intervention of a woman, particularly one with close ties to one of the men involved, could end the fight. However, for women, fights were often public and there was never any form of intervention. These fights were seen as spectacles and were often observed by various members of the group until one woman ceded or was sufficiently wounded. Additionally, women's fights differ from men's in the use of weapons. Traditionally, it was not uncommon for Qom women to use knuckle-dusters. These weapons were made from wood or pieces of hide and sharp objects such as piranha teeth or sharpened rocks could be added in order to cause more damage to one's opponent. Even among children, this difference between physical aggression between girls and boys has been observed in which young girls seem more aggressive and engage in physical fights more often than boys.

Today, gender roles among the Qom have changed. In more rural areas, women are becoming increasingly involved in maintaining sheep and goat herds as well as in craftsmanship, weaving complex tapestries and handbags. While men are still involved in hunting and farming, the emergence of jobs in state agencies such as a municipality or other public sector jobs have resulted in a large change in Qom society. Increasingly, men are being seen as the primary income recipient in the household, resulting in increasingly unequal gender roles for the Qom. On a larger scale, this development has led to the development of a social hierarchy among the Qom where there was previously none, resulting in social inequalities and unrest among some Qom communities.

=== Nutrition and agriculture ===
Until the 19th century, the Qom were primarily a hunter-gatherer, semi-nomadic society that traveled in pursuit of dietary resources. There also existed a very strict sexual division of labor: the men, from a very early age, dedicated themselves to hunting and fishing and the women collected food and worked in incipient agricultural gardens that were in large part influenced by contributions from the groups from the Andean and Amazonian regions. In this way, the Qom women cultivated plants such as nachitek (squash), oltañi (corn), avagha (beans), sweet potatoes and manioc on small and medium-sized plots. However, these products were only complementary to their diet and the Qom never produced a surplus of such items. One possible explanation for this is that between the months of August and September, the Qom went through what was known as the Hungry Season and the period of silence. This time, the end of winter and the beginning of spring, represents a period in weather in which it is hard to successfully support and produce agriculture and wildlife is often not as active as it might be due to periods of cold weather. During this time, Qom women would often gather what they considered to be emergency foods: such as prickly pears, tubers and reeds. Another ecological explanation for this apparent flaw is that the climate and soil of their territory did not have a high enough yield for agricultural production while the Chaco territory, in its natural state, was a great source for supplying the Qom's dietary needs, especially with respect to proteins. The Qom hunted principally tapirs, peccaries, deer, guanaco and a large variety of birds. Additionally, the Qom used to collect honey and large amounts of fruit and berries.

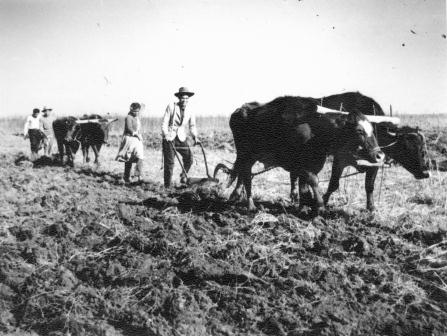
Members of the Qom community in the early 1960s use an ox to plow the fields of their farm.

During the 19th century and the first half of the 20th century, the Qom farmed small and medium-sized plots or worked as temporary laborers at rural jobs, such as being an axeman or a cotton picker. As incipient cultivators, their agriculture is primarily subsistence in nature where the cultivation of squash, manioc and sweet potatoes was most common. Another way in which the Qom obtained resources is the diversification of artisanal interests such as ceramics, Guaiacum products, and textiles. However, in the second half of the 20th century, many Qom were forced to migrate to the city, especially cities such as Roque Sáenz Peña, Resistencia, Gran Santa Fe, Gran Rosario and Gran Buenos Aires, due to the destruction of their agricultural lands and the introduction of the soybean plant. In such urban nuclei, almost all Qom in their entirety live in poorer economic zones.

One group on investigators from the Department of Agriculture in the University of Buenos Aires, together with members of the Qom community "La Primavera" are working to reintroduce some sixty Indigenous types of corn that are not reproducing as they should. According to Julián Hernández, "The objective is to reintroduce native corn varieties adapted to the environmental conditions of the northeast Argentina and the Chaco region, to support the availability of food and to better the economic earnings of an Indigenous group in the region". Hernández has studied these varieties of corn for more than thirty-five years and will be the director of a joint initiative to lead a team of agriculturalists, anthropologists and biologists from the University of Buenos Aires.

== Presence in culture ==
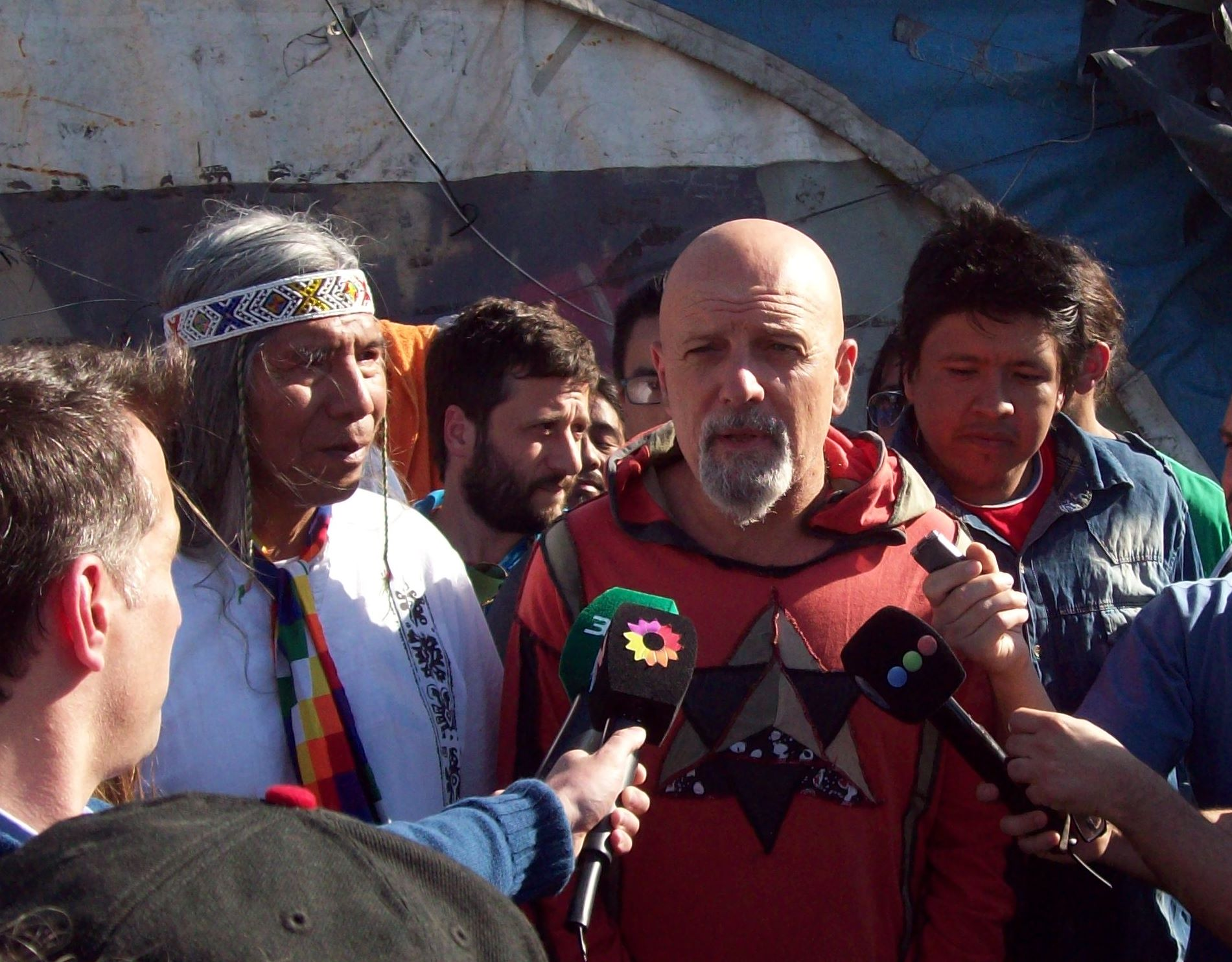
Gustavo Cordera and Félix Díaz meet at the protest camp in Buenos Aires.

Many Argentine authors and composers portray the Qom community as one of the themes of their works. One of such works is "Antiguo dueño de las flechas" ("The Ancient Owner of the Arrows"), a song more frequently recognized by its opening line: "Indio toba". The lyrics to "Antiguo dueño de las flechas" were written by historian and poet Félix Luna while the melody was composed by a pianist and composer from Santa Fe by the name of Ariel Ramírez. The song was registered by SADAÍC (The Argentine Society of Authors and Composers) in 1974 and the most popular version of the song was performed by Mercedes Sosa. The duo Tonolec interpreted the song in the Qom's own language and mixed then released the new version with electronic rhythms. The chief of the Qom, Félix Díaz, sang the song together with Gustavo Cordera at the Qom camp.

The general history of the Qom community and other Guaicurue ethnic group was captured in the work Historia sagrada del pueblo qom en el país chaqueño (The Sacred History of the Qom Community in the Country of Chaco) by the Argentine Flavio Dalastto, who has published volumes one and two of a collection of five.

In 2008, Jorge Luis Nuñez and Gustavo Giorgetti directed a short documentary called Tierras prometidas: El periplo de los aborigenes Tobas (Promised Land: The Journey of the Toba Aboriginals). While the documentary begins with interactions between the Qom people and Spanish missionaries and discusses the various struggles the Qom have historically faced until the present day, the vast majority of Tierras prometidas focuses on the April 19th Qom Community that lives in Buenos Aires, in the neighborhood of Dock Sud. As one of the largest petrochemical hubs in Buenos Aires, Dock Sud is regarded as one of the most polluted areas in Buenos Aires, where heavy metals and chemical contamination are prevalent and endanger the lives of those living around the contaminated river. Chief Ruben Sarmiento describes the struggles the Qom people face living in this community, including poverty, discrimination, malnutrition, crime, Tuberculosis and Chagas disease.

== Flags ==
The Qom flag

The second Qom flag

The Qom use three different flags in order to represent themselves and their culture. One flag, pictured to the left, shows yellow, green and red vertical stripes in a repeating pattern Here, the colors of the Qom flag represent the seasons in the Chaco region where the Qom traditionally live: yellow represents the flowers in the springtime, green represents all the trees in the summer and rusty-red color represents the ripe fruit of the fall. The repetition of the colors signifies the cycle of the seasons and the continuation of the Qom way of life. A second Qom flag shares similar color symbolism to the first. However, there are two major differences between the flags: their pattern and the use of blue horizontal stripes in the second flag. While there does not appear to be great significance with respect to the change in pattern between the two flags, the blue, horizontal stripes of the second flag represent water and its impact on life and the earth.

The Wiphala

The final flag used by the Qom is the Wiphala, a flag used by many Indigenous communities in South America. The Qom, and other Indigenous groups in Argentina, use the Qullasuyu version of the flag where the longest diagonal stripe of the flag is made using white squares. The Qom's use of this flag became especially popular during more recent land protests when various Indigenous groups protested jointly in an attempt to regain their ancestral lands.

== Communities ==
=== Argentina ===
Since 1995, the National Institute of Indigenous Issues (INAI) began to recognize legal capacity through the means of registration with the National Register of Indigenous Communities (RENACI) to Indigenous communities in Argentina. For the Qom or Toba people, the following communities have been legally recognized.

Province of Buenos Aires

- Daviaxaiqui Indigenous Community, Morón, September 27, 1995
- April 19 Indigenous Community, Marcos Paz, May 23, 1996
- Yecthakay Indigenous Community, Tigre, September 15, 1999
- Migtagan Toba Aboriginal Community, Almirante Brown, December 20, 2000
- Dapiguen La’Ecpi’ Community — The Natives of Northern Argentina —, Quilmes, June 8, 2001
- Toba Roots Community, La Plata, October 9, 2002
- Yapé Toba Aboriginal Community, Quilmes, January 7, 2004
- Community of Indigenous Peoples, Berazategui, April 16, 2004
- Laphole Community, San Nicolás, November 1, 2005
- Nam Qom Community, La Plata, April 7, 2011

Province of Chaco

- Makable Indigenous Community, November 28, 1995
- Cacique Moreno Indigenous Community, June 30, 1995
- Villa Teresita Indigenous Community, June 30, 1995
- El Pindo Indigenous Community, June 30, 1995
- Cincuenta Viviendas Indigenous Community, November 28, 1995
- Delek Island Indigenous Community, June 30, 1995
- Laguna Pato — Lapel Huptaxañilay — Indigenous Community, June 30, 1995
- Paraje Maipú Indigenous Community, June 30, 1995
- Rancho Viejo — Payrore — Indigenous Community, June 30, 1995
- Rincón del Zorro Indigenous Community, June 30, 1995
- Villa Margarita Indigenous Community, June 30, 1995
- Yatay Indigenous Community, June 30, 1995
- 7 Tree Colony Indigenous Community, August 12, 1996
- Barrio Industrial Indigenous Community, May 17, 1996
- Barrio Toba-Lote 532 Indigenous Community, May 17, 1996
- Basail Indigenous Community, January 10, 1996
- Campo Winter Indigenous Community, April 1, 1996
- Costaine Indigenous Community, January 10, 1996
- Barrio Esperanza Indigenous Community, May 9, 1996
- Fidelidad Indigenous Community, April 1, 1996
- Laguna Lobos Indigenous Community, May 17, 1996
- Mapic Indigenous Community, January 10, 1996
- Margarita Belén Indigenous Community, January 10, 1996
- Nala — Sol de Mayo — Indigenous Community, Bermejo, June 1, 2001
- El Toroltay Aboriginal Toba Community, General Güemes, May 23, 2003
- Barrio Norte Río Bermejito Toba Community, General Güemes, April 22, 2008
- Barrio Curishi Aboriginal Community, General Güemes, October 5, 2010
- Torolshere Aboriginal Community, Paraje Pozo del Toro, Juan José Castelli, General Güemes, April 18, 2012
- El Zanjón Qom Community, Paraje el Zanjón, Juan José Castelli, General Güemes, October 8, 2013
- Barrio Quinta Number 12 Qom Community, Juan José Castello, General Güemes, March 11, 2014

Province of Santa Fe

- Las Lomas Indigenous Community, October 9, 1995
- Florencia Aboriginal Community, General Obligado October 4, 1999
- Cotapic-El Quebracho Aboriginal Community, General Obligado, October 18, 2001
- Quompi-Mucha Gente Aborigen Aboriginal Community, General Obligado, August 8, 2001
- Nam Qom Community, Rosario, February 28, 2002
- Qadhuoqte Community, Rosario, July 1, 2004
- Barrio Toba Cacique Francisco Moreno Aboriginal Community, Rosario, April 22, 2008
- Toba Qom Lmac’Na Alua Aboriginal Community — Land of the Aboriginals —, Rosario, December 19, 2008
- Qomlashi Lma Nam Qom Toba Community — Place of the Toba —, The Capital, July 31, 2009
- Qar Ka La Community, Rafaela, Castellans, November 17, 2010 (This community is the only one listed that has been resisted and recognized by the Special Registry of Aboriginal Communities of Santa Fe but is not recognized by the National Registry of Indigenous Communities)

Toba and Mocoví communities in Santa Fe

- El Pignik Mocoví and Toba Aboriginal Community, General Obligado, November 3, 2000
- Ralagay Yogoñí — New Dawn — Aboriginal Community, Rosario, November 7, 2006

Province of Salta

- Kom Lek Toba Community, Tartagal, General José de San Martín, September 1, 2000
- Misión La Loma Toba Indigenous Community, Embarcación, General José de San Martín, October 14, 2003
- Berger Johnson Barrio El Tanque Aboriginal Community, Embarcación, General José de San Martín, June 5, 2014
- Com Km 3 Toba Aboriginal Community, General Mosconi, General José de San Martín, August 1, 2003
- Toba Aboriginal Community 1, Tartagal, General José de San Martín, July 13, 2000
- Aboriginal Community for Ethnic Toba, Tartagal, General José de San Martín, December 28, 2000
- Kom Toba Community, Tartagal, General José de San Martín, March 24, 2003
- El Algarrobal Ethnic Toba Community, Tartagal, General José de San Martín, July 13, 2010
- Hcomlaje Toba Community, Tartagal, San José de San Martín, February 11, 2011
- Kom Lañoko-Misión Toba, Santa Victoria Este, Rivadavia, November 27, 2000
- Monte Carmelo-Kom Lahachaca Community, Santa Victoria Este, Rovadavia, October 8, 2013

Province of Formosa

- Barrio Mitre de El Colorado Aboriginal Community, Pirané, October 18, 2001
- Laguna Gobernador Llaxataxay Aboriginal Community, Laishí, September 5, 2002
- San Antonio Dalaxaic Ñalacpi Aboriginal Community, Laishí, January 7, 2004
- El Desaguadero Quanogoqui Alejo Alegre, Pirané, January 14, 2004
- Alua’ Poxoyaxaic — Santo Domingo — Community, Patiño, October 19, 2009
- Qom Potae Napocna Community, Pilcomayo, August 19, 2011

=== Paraguay ===
In accordance with Paraguay's National Census for Indigenous Groups of 2012, 2,057 Qom live in Paraguay. Of these 2,057 people, 1,840 live in the region of Presidente Hayes and 217 live in the region of San Pedro.

=== Bolivia ===
In Bolivia, the Toba live as nomads in the forest between the rivers Bermejo and Pilcomayo and as far as Villa Montes. Conflicts between the Qom and the Spanish were common. In the early 1840s, the Qom revolted against Spanish soldiers led by General Manuel Rodríguez Magariños after their attempts to build forts and reduce Toba territory. In 1880, the Mission of San Francisco was founded in Villa Montes with the goal of civilizing the Toba, Mataco (a Wichi tribe) and Chiriguanos. In 1882, the Toba were in conflict with the colonies of Caiza. On April 27, 1882, a group of Toba killed a French explorer by the name of Jules Crevaux who worked on behalf of the Bolivian government. Throughout the entirety of the 1880s, the Bolivian government sponsored and financially supported groups of colonists in the Chaco region to kill members of the Qom and other Indigenous groups. After continued confrontations, many Toba immigrated to Paraguayan territory. In 1912, a massacre of Toba people by military troops led by Colonel Ponce occurred in San Francisco. The Qom who survived fled to Argentina. By 1923, most Toba people had fled Bolivia, leaving the remaining members essentially powerless.

== Sources ==
- Los indios Tobas en Rosario, Argentina (in Spanish)
- Gordillo, Gaston 2004 Landscapes of Devils: Tensions of Place and Memory in the Argentinian Chaco. Durham: Duke University Press.
- Gordillo, Gaston 2005 Nosotros vamos an estar acá para siempre: historias tobas. Buenos Aires: Biblos.
- Miller, Elmer 1979 Los tobas argentinos: armonía y disonancia en una sociedad. Mexico City: Siglo XXI.
