= Indigenous peoples of South America =

Total population
- approx. 18 million

Regions with significant populations
- Peru: 5.9 million (2017)
- Bolivia: 4.1 million (2012)
- Chile: 2.4 million (2017)
- Brazil: 1.7 million (2022)
- Colombia: 1.9 million (2018)
- Argentina: 1.3 million (2022)
- Ecuador: 1.3 million (2023)
- Venezuela: 724,592 (2011)
- Uruguay: 223,964 (2023)
- Paraguay: 117,150 (2012)
- Guyana: 78,492 (2012)
- Suriname: 20,344 (2012)
- French Guiana: approx. 19,000

Languages
- Indigenous languages of the Americas, including Quechua, Aymara, Guarani, Mapuche

Religion
- Native American religions; Christianity; Others

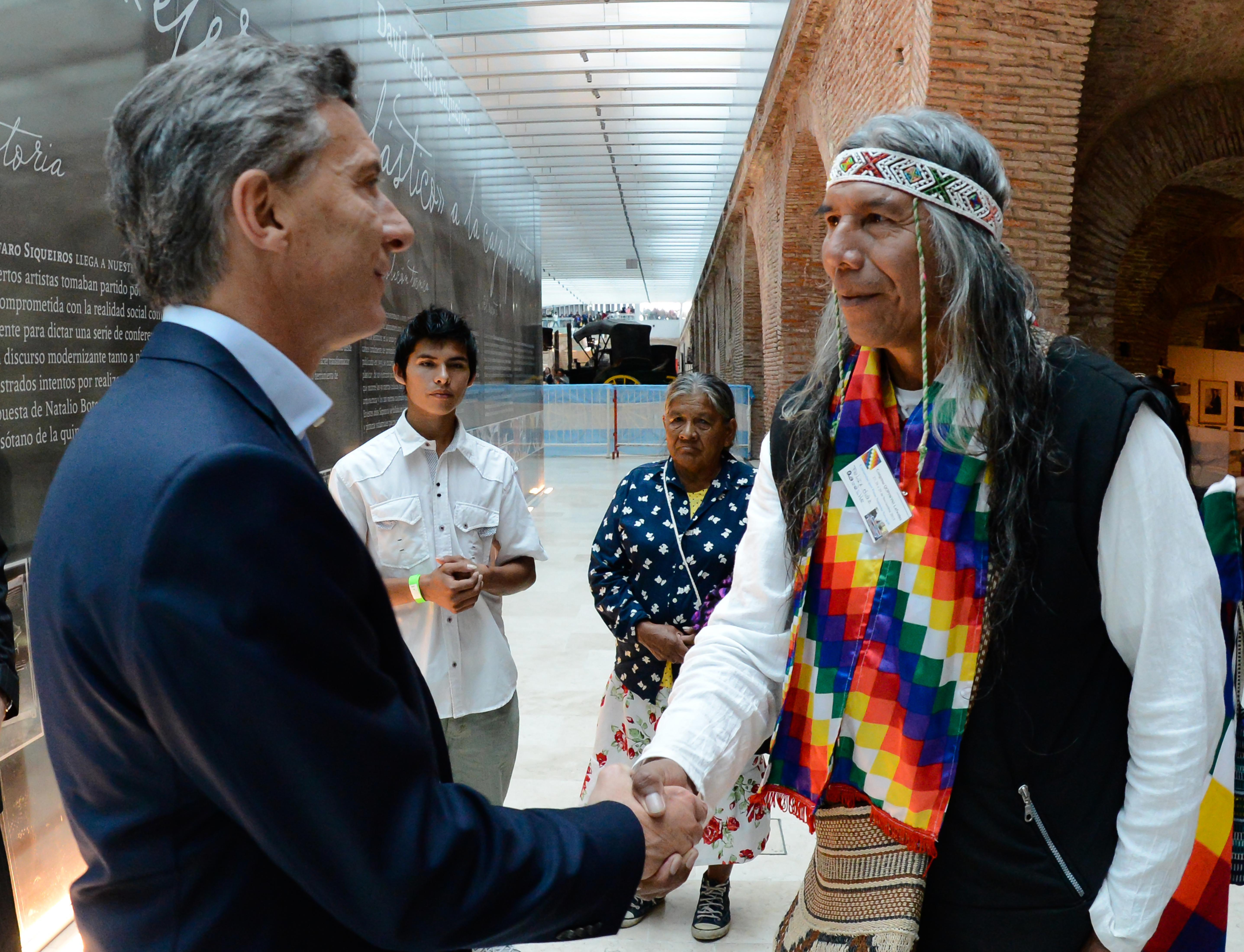
Qom native rights activist Félix Díaz meets Argentine president Mauricio Macri.

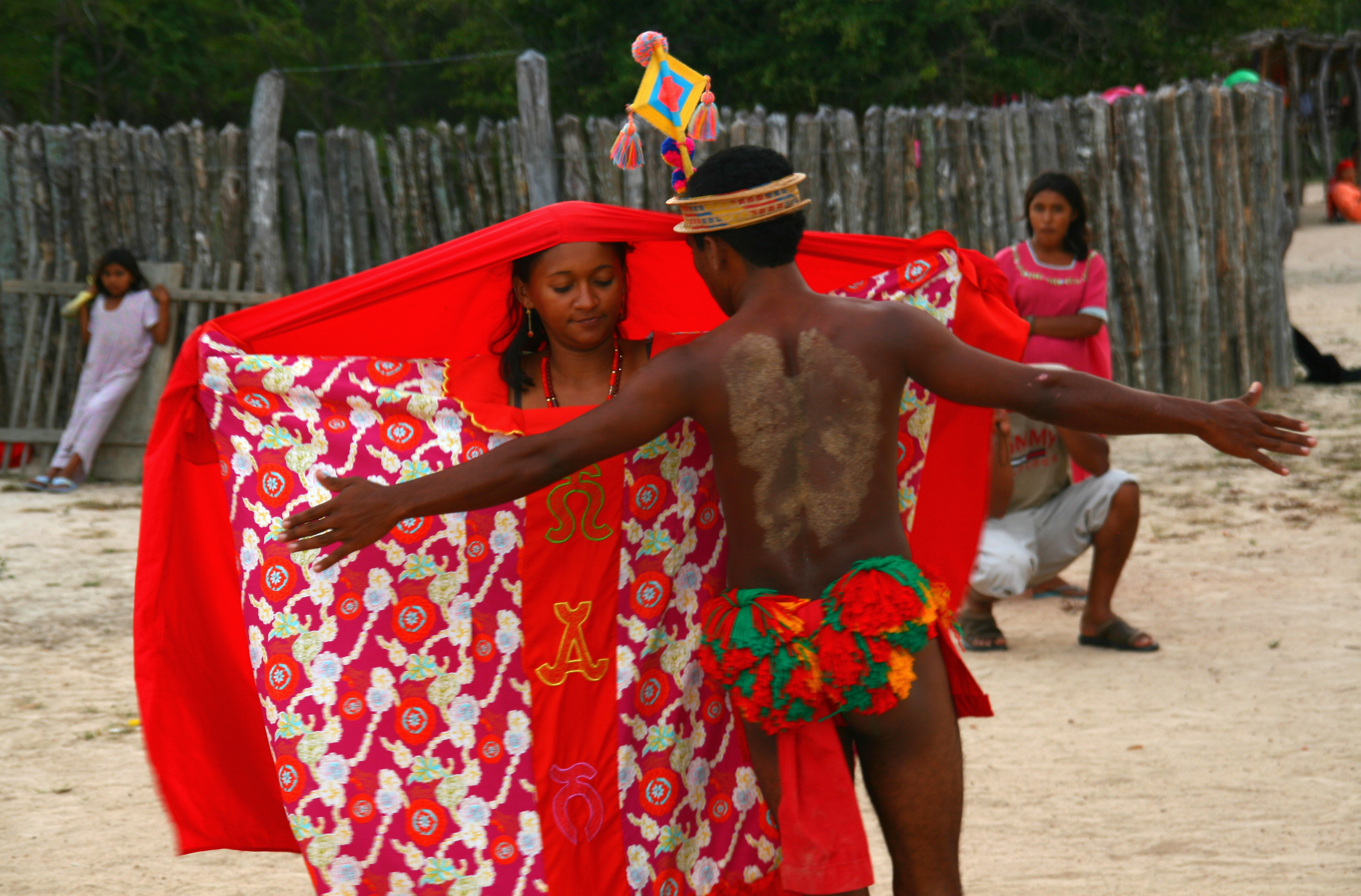
Indigenous peoples in Colombia

In South America, Indigenous peoples comprise the Pre-Columbian peoples and their descendants, as contrasted with people of European ancestry and those of African descent. In Spanish, Indigenous peoples are referred to as pueblos indígenas (lit. 'Indigenous peoples'), or pueblos nativos (lit. 'native peoples'). The term aborigen (lit. 'aborigine') is used in Argentina, and pueblos aborígenes (lit. 'aboriginal peoples') is commonly used in Colombia. The English term Amerindian (short for "Indians of the Americas") is often used in the Guianas. Latin Americans of mixed European and Indigenous descent are usually referred to as mestizos (Spanish) and mestiços (Portuguese), while those of mixed African and Indigenous ancestry are referred to as zambos.

It is believed that the first human populations of South America either arrived from Asia into North America via the Bering Land Bridge and migrated southwards or alternatively from Polynesia across the Pacific. The earliest generally accepted archaeological evidence for human habitation in South America dates to 14,000 years ago, and is located at the Monte Verde site in southern Chile. The descendants of these first inhabitants would become the Indigenous populations of South America.

Before the Spanish colonization of the Americas, many of the Indigenous peoples of South America were hunter-gatherers and indeed many still are, especially in the Amazon rainforest. Others, especially the Andean cultures, practised sophisticated agriculture, utilized advanced irrigation and kept domesticated livestock, such as llamas and alpacas.

The only South American country that presently has a majority-Indigenous population is Bolivia, with 62% of Bolivians identifying as a member of an Indigenous group.

South American Indigenous peoples include:

- Indigenous peoples in Argentina
- Indigenous peoples in Bolivia
- Indigenous peoples in Brazil
- Indigenous peoples in Chile
- Indigenous peoples in Colombia
- Indigenous peoples in Ecuador
- Indigenous peoples in French Guiana
- Indigenous peoples in Guyana
- Indigenous peoples in Paraguay
- Indigenous peoples in Peru
- Indigenous peoples in Suriname
- Indigenous peoples in Uruguay
- Indigenous peoples in Venezuela

== See also ==
- Indigenous peoples of North America
- Native American religions
- Wars involving Indigenous peoples of South America
- List of Indigenous peoples
- Ceramics of Indigenous peoples of the Americas
