= Gabriela Exilart =

Gabriela Exilart (birth surname Baruffaldi, 19 August 1970) is an Argentine writer, lawyer, and professor from the city of Mar del Plata. Most of her works are historical novels, often focused on lesser-known episodes in Argentine history like the 1944 San Juan earthquake, the Revolution of the Park and the Napalpí massacre in the province of Chaco.

== Selected works ==
- Pinceladas de azabache
- Secretos al alba
- Renacer de los escombros
- El vuelo de la libélula
- Pulsión
- Por la sangre derramada
- El susurro de las mujeres
- Con el corazón al sur
- Tormentas del pasado
- En la arena de Gijón
