= Bermejo River =

River of Argentina and Bolivia

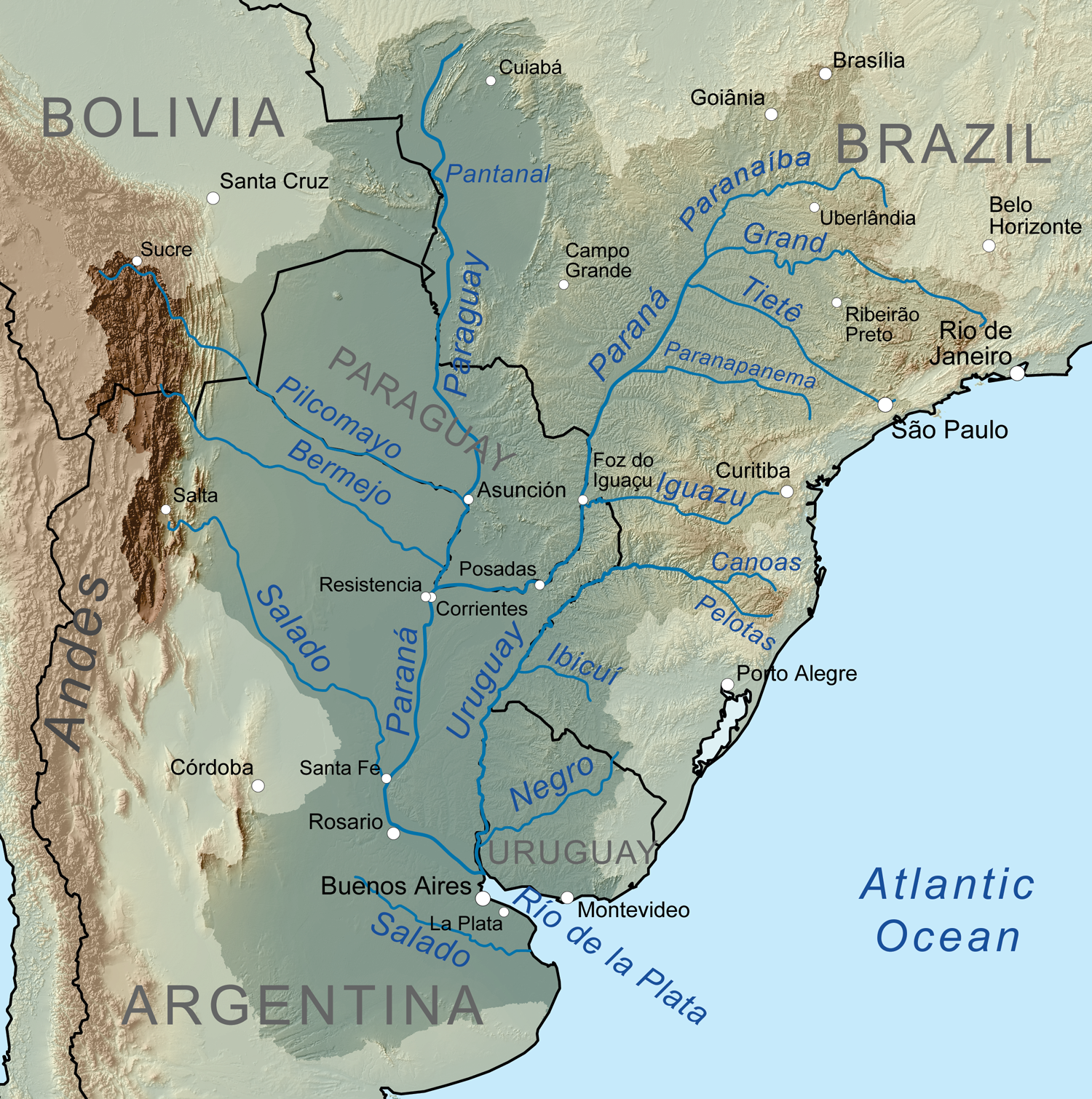
Map of the Rio de la Plata Basin, showing the Bermejo River joining the Paraguay River north of Resistencia.

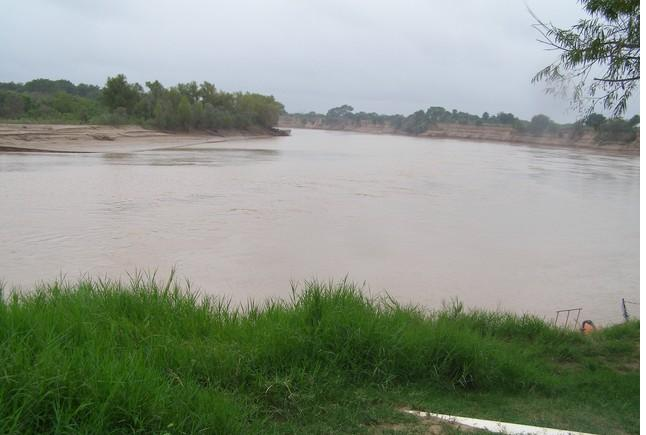
The Bermejo River at Presidencia Roca in the Argentine Gran Chaco

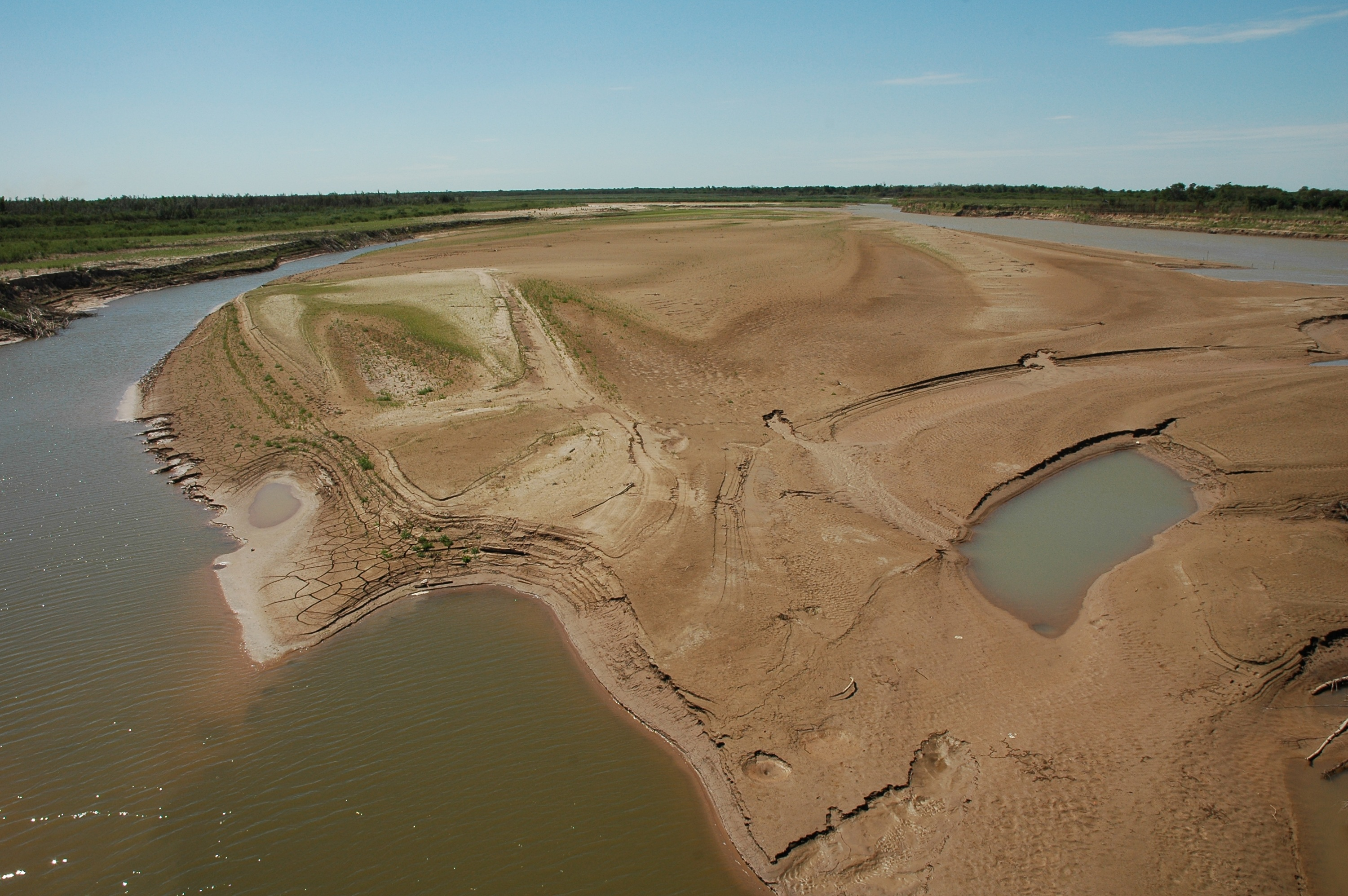
The Bermejo seen from Puente Lavalle upstream.

The Bermejo River (Spanish, Río Bermejo meaning Red River) is a river in South America that flows from Bolivia to the Paraguay River in Argentina. The river is generally called Bermejo in spite of its different names along its way, but it also has its own Native American names; in Wichí it is called Teuco, and in Guaraní it is called Ypitá. In the plains of Argentina's Gran Chaco the Bermejo forms wetlands and splits into two branches. The southern branch is the bed of the old Bermejo River, now an intermittent stream called Río Bermejito. The northern branch is now the main stem of the Bermejo and is called the Teuco River (Río Teuco), Bermejo Nuevo, or simply the Bermejo River. The two branches rejoin at 25°39′S 60°11′W, near Villa Río Bermejito, forming the Lower Bermejo River.

The Bermejo River is 1,060 kilometres (660 mi) long and has a drainage basin of 123,000 square kilometres (47,000 sq mi). Its mean annual discharge is irregular and varies between 20 cubic metres per second (710 cu ft/s) and 14,000 cubic metres per second (490,000 cu ft/s).

The river is born in a mountain range known as Sierra de Santa Victoria around coordinates 22°00′14″S 64°57′30″W near Tarija, a few kilometres southeast of Chaguaya in Bolivia, and not far from La Quiaca, Jujuy Province, Argentina. In general, it maintains a southeastern direction. At its highest part, its main tributaries are the Lipeo River, and further downstream the Grande de Tarija, the Iruya River, and the San Francisco River. It forms part of the international boundary between Argentina and Bolivia.

The Bermejo is not navigable. In the late 19th century, numerous attempts were made to open up the commercial navigation of the river, but all of them failed, largely due to the river's shallow waters, which carry enormous amounts of sediment. Near the Tropic of Capricorn, the river splits in two; the smaller southern branch, Bermejito, and the northern branch that is known as the Teuco River (also called Bermejo or Bermejo Nuevo). When leaving the province of Salta, the Teuco marks the boundary between the provinces of Chaco and Formosa.

The Bermejito, is intermittent and meandering. It crosses Chaco Province near the El Impenetrable jungle. On the shores of this river can still be seen the ruins of the former towns of Concepcion del Bermejo, San Bernardo de Vértiz (25°8′S 61°8′W), and La Cangayé (25°36′S 60°19′W).

The Teuco follows its course to finality and into the Paraguay River, in front of the city of Pilar, in Paraguay.

The river carries red-coloured sediments and produces irregular accumulations that can even alter its course, leaving the older paths as wet depressions.

== See also ==
- List of rivers of Argentina
- List of rivers of Bolivia
