= Napalpí massacre =

1924 massacre of Indigenous people in Argentina

Coordinates: 26°55′02″S 60°06′43″W

- Chaco Segundo plane used during the attack

- Napalpí (Argentina)
- Location: Napalpí, Chaco Province, Argentina
- Date: 19 July 1924; 102 years ago
- Target: Indigenous Toba people and Mocoví people
- Attack type: Massacre
- Weapons: Firearms, machetes
- Deaths: 400
- Perpetrators: Argentine Police; Ranchers

The Napalpí massacre occurred on 19 July 1924, in Napalpí, a rural village in the Chaco Province of Northeast Argentina. It involved the massacre of 400 Indigenous people of the Toba and Mocoví ethnicity by the Argentine Police and ranchers.

== Historical context ==
Forty years earlier, the Argentine Army had been involved in a military campaign to subjugate the Indigenous people, mostly Guaycuru of several different ethnic groups, of the Argentine Chaco called the Conquest of Chaco. The campaign resulted in the death of thousands of Indigenous people, the displacement of many more, and the social and cultural destruction of numerous ethnic groups from the provinces of Chaco and Formosa.

The Argentine forces established a line of fortresses in order to gain lands for European settlers. The land was mainly used by the settlers to grow cotton. The native people were confined in compounds, where they were subjected to a regime of exploitation bordering on slavery. One of the compounds was Napalpí, which means cemetery in the Toba Qom language. Its official name was "Colonia Aborigen Chaco" (Chaco Aboriginal Colony). It was founded in 1911. The first families installed there were Pilagá, Abipón, Toba, Charrúa and Mocoví.

The inhabitants of Napalpí had started to produce cotton, but in 1924 the Argentine authorities imposed a tax of 15% of the cotton crop which created great discontent and a strike.

In retaliation for this, groups of Indigenous people started killing animals and damaging the crops of the European settlers. In June 1924, a shaman named Sorai was killed by the police; later a French settler was killed, probably in an act of vengeance. After this incident, Fernando Centeno, the Governor of Chaco, prepared a ferocious and brutal repression of the Indigenous people.

== The massacre ==
Early in the morning of 19 July 1924, a group of 130 men (police, ranchers and white citizens), armed with Winchester and Mauser rifles, attacked the Indigenous people who had only spears to defend themselves. The attack lasted 45 minutes. At the end, the wounded, including women and children, were killed with machetes.

The bodies of the dead were mutilated with testicles, ears and other body parts taken as trophies. The dead were either burned or buried in mass graves. After the massacre, repression against the native peoples continued for weeks as those who had escaped the massacre were targeted by the settlers and police.

The last known survivor of the Napalpí Massacre was Rosa Grillo (born 22 February 1908). She died on April 4, 2023.

== Accounts of the massacre ==
At the end of the 1920s the journal Heraldo del Norte stated that:

"Around 9 o'clock in the morning, without a shot being fired by the innocent aboriginies[,] [the police] fired repeatedly at close range, in the panic the "indios" (more women and children than men) tried to attack resulting in the most cowardly and ferocious carnage, and the killing of the injured without respect for gender or age."

On 29 August, 40 days after the massacre, the former director of the Napalpí compound, Enrique Lynch Arribálzaga wrote a letter that was read in the National Congress:

"The massacre of the Indigenous people by the Chaco police continues in Napalpí and the surrounding areas, it seems that they want to eliminate all potential witnesses to the carnage of July 19, so that they cannot testify to the investigative commission"

In the book Memorias del Gran Chaco, by historian Mercedes Silva, an account by a mocoví, Pedro Maidana, stated that "they killed in a savage manner, they cut off the testicles and an ear to exhibit as trophies of the battle".

In the book Napalpí, la herida abierta (Napalpí, the open wound) the journalist Mario Vidal wrote:

"The attack ended in a massacre, the worst massacre in the history of the indigenous cultures in the 20th Century. The attackers only ceased fire when it was clear that there were no "indios" that were not dead or injured. The injured were beheaded, others hung. In the end around 200 men, women and children and a few white farmers loyal to the indigenous cause".

A recent documentary by "la Red de Comunicación Indígena" (the network of Indigenous Communication) stated:

"Over 5,000 shots were fired and the orgy of blood included the extraction of testicles, penises and ears of the dead, these sad trophies were exhibited in the precinct of Quitilipi. Some of the dead were buried in mass graves, others were burnt."

In the same transmission the chief Toba, Esteban Moreno, told the story that had been passed down the generations:

"In the camps appeared soldiers and an aeroplane flew overhead. They killed them because they would not harvest. We call it a massacre because it was only aboriginies that died, Tobas and mocovíes, it was not a fight because not one soldier was injured, after the killing, the massacre that place is called the Colony of the Massacre."

== Truth Trial ==
In 2019, a federal court of Argentina declared the Napalpí massacre a crime against humanity and because of this it was excluded from the statute of limitations. Over 80 years after the Napalpí massacre, nobody has been punished or found guilty, the crime remains unpunished and the few lands that remain in aboriginal ownership are being continually encroached. In 2022, Argentina opened a 'truth trial' to recollect the events. No one is being prosecuted, as there is no defendant alive.

Horacio Pietragalla Corti the Argentine Secretary of Human Rights said "this trial is going to build through justice a truth that remains written, that symbolically repairs families of the victims, democracy and new generations.”

On May 19 an Argentine judge declared the Argentine government was responsible for the massacre, requiring the government to teach about the massacre in schools, that the following investigation be broadcast on TV, and recommending that the Argentine Congress set up a date of national commemoration.

== Sources ==
- Martínez Sarasola, Carlos: Nuestros paisanos los indios. Buenos Aires: Emecé Editores, 1992 ISBN 950-04-1153-9

== See also ==
- History of Argentina (1916-1930)
- List of massacres in Argentina
