= List of wars involving Indigenous peoples of South America =

Indigenous peoples of South America have been involved in several wars of different scale and nature. Conflicts with Iberoamerican states and between different Indigenous groups have decreased over time.

- Chanka–Inca War (c. 1438)
- Colla–Inca War (1445–1450)
- Chimor–Inca War (c. 1470)
- Inca–Mapuche War (some point between 1471 and 1493)
- Inca Civil War (1525–1527)
- Spanish conquest of the Inca Empire (1532–1572)
- Arauco War (1550–1662)
- Calchaquí Wars (1562–1667)
  - First Chalchaquí War (1560–1563)
  - Viltipoco Rebellion (1594)
  - Second Chalchaquí War (1630–1643)
  - Third Chalchaquí War (1658–1667)
- Huilliche uprising of 1712
- Mapuche uprising of 1723
- Ava Guaraní uprising of 1727
- Juan Santos Rebellion (1742–1752)
- Guaraní War (1756)
- Mapuche uprising of 1766
- Ava Guaraní uprising of 1778
- Ava Guaraní uprising of 1779
- Rebellion of Túpac Amaru II (1780–1782)
- Huilliche uprising of 1792
- Chilean War of Independence (1810–1822)
- Occupation of Araucanía (1861–1883)
- Conquest of the Desert (1872–1884)
- Ava Guaraní uprising of 1874
- Sierra campaign (1881–1883)
- Ava Guaraní uprising of 1891
- Bolivian Civil War (1898–1899)
- Peruvian Internal Conflict (1980–2000)

== Works cited ==
- D'Altroy, Terence N. (2014). The Incas. Wiley-Blackwell.
- Favre, Henri (2020). Les Incas (10 ed.). Presses Universitaires de France.
- Rostworowski, María (1999). History of the Inca Realm. Translated by B. Iceland, Harry. Cambridge University Press.
- Urton, Gary (1999). Inca Myths. British Museum Press. ISBN 978-0-7141-1791-1.
- Netherly, Patricia J. (1988). "El Reino de Chimor y el Tawantinsuyu". In Dillehay, Tom D.; Netherly, Patricia (eds.). La frontera del Estado Inca (PDF) (in Spanish). Quito.
