= Qopiwini =

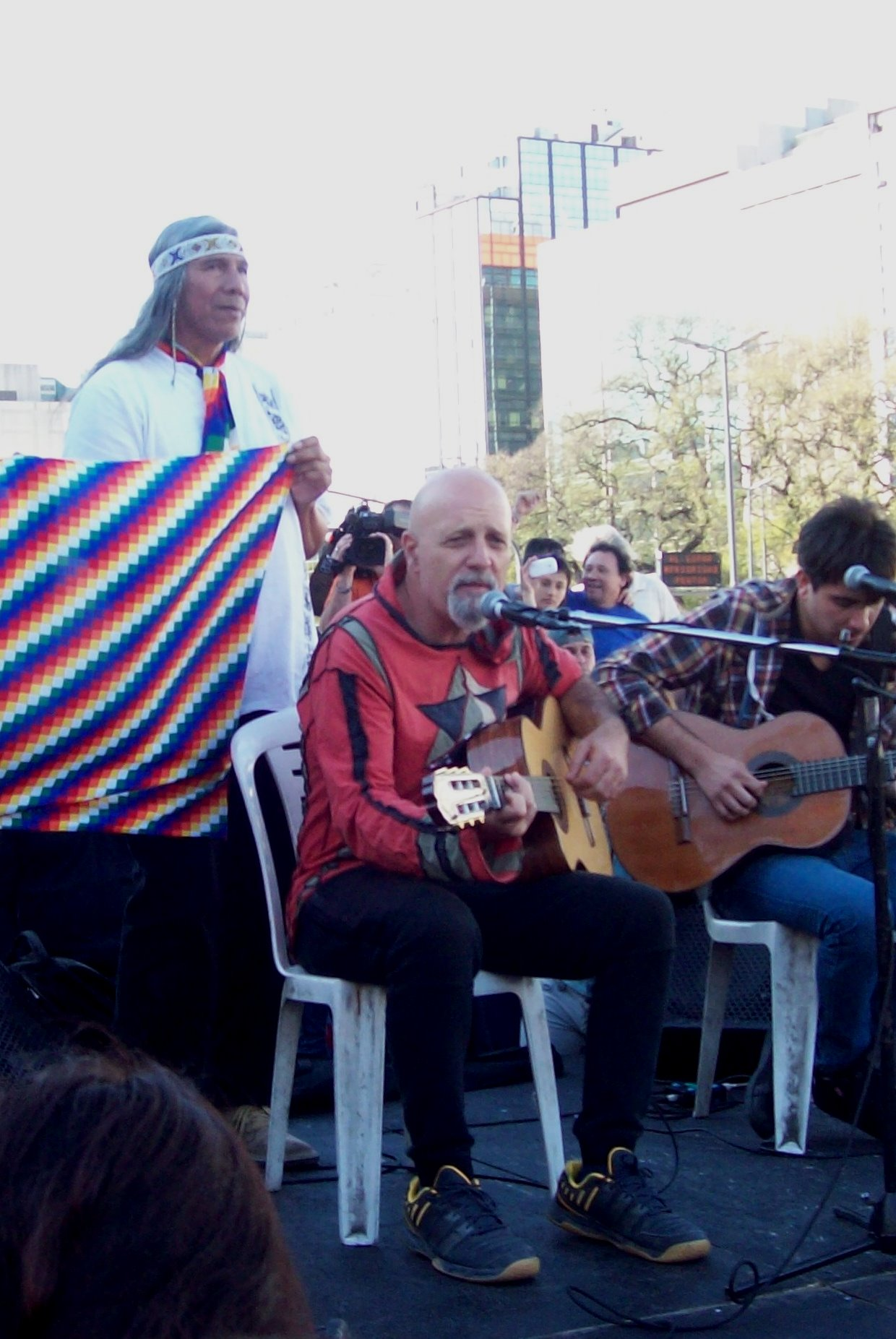
Félix Díaz beside the Argentinian musician Gustavo Cordera in a concert that offer this last for Qopiwini on 1 September 2015.

Qopiwini Lafwetes (Qo.wi.pi.ni. respecting the original spelling) is a group that includes aboriginal cultural settlements in the Province of Formosa in Argentina. It encompasses peoples from the Qom, Pilagá, Wichi and Nivaclé ethnic groups of Argentina. It was formed at the beginning of 2015. In February 2015, they set up a protest camp at the intersection of Avenues 9 of Julio and Avenue of May to draw attention to the repressive actions against the aborigines by the government of Formosa, and to collect citizens' signatures supporting their cause. Included in the camp were some forty representatives of the forty-six communities of the Qom, Pilagá, Wichi and Nivaclé villages.

The leader of the group is Félix Díaz, spokesperson (qarashé) of the Qom Potae Napocna Navogoh community. However, the organization debates the steps to be followed in an assembly.

== Antecedents, meetings and assemblies ==
In 2010, local aboriginal peoples formed a picket on National Route 86 in protest against attempts to clear them from their traditional homelands. The Formosa Police responded with heavy violence and two native people were killed and others injured. Following this, Félix Díaz began to summon self-governing native assemblies in the province of Formosa between 2014 and 2015, and together with other leaders, gave instructions regarding the defense of the Rights of the Native Peoples in Argentina. They held five assemblies in different places in the province, and served to stimulate the undertaking of the defense of their rights.

In January 2015, members of the Poate Napocna Navogoh community went back to block National Route 86, demanding a stop to the violence and neglect within the community. In addition, they demanded that the provincial authorities report on the state of the works of infrastructure that has been initiated in the zone, such as houses, hospitals and roads, the date of is completion and details of its distribution. Amnesty International stated that the blocking of the road was so that "they claimed their rights and promises unfulfilled by the government" and said, on the repression of November 23, 2010, in the same way, "This must not happen again". International Amnesty requested that the government fulfill the injunction of the Inter-American Commission of Human Rights of 2011, that obliges the protection of the Qom's integrity.

The Consciencia Solidaria NGO was present at the meeting in Cacique Colorado, where they began to debate a possible group called Qopiwini. After this meeting, it was decided to make the next Assembly in March 2015 in the Community Potae Napocna Navogoh, the community led by Félix Díaz. This never materialized.

On May 27-29, 2015, the First National Summit of the Native Peoples was organized and summoned by Qopiwini in the House of Nazareth, Carlos Calvo 3121, Autonomous City of Buenos Aires. They discussed benchmarks with regards to human rights and resistance facing the civic-military dictatorship. A school-style orange poster written by hand indicates that this was the headquarters of the meeting. Inside the wide room, there were groups of ten in circles, half inside the room, while the other half was in the garden. There was a presentation to about one hundred delegates and authorities of twenty-five native villages from seventeen provinces, between them Missions, Chaco, Formosa, Salta, Jujuy, Tucumán, San Juan, Buenos Aires, Mendoza, Neuquén and Río Negro. There the gathered representatives from other villages and communities shared similar experiences of situations that existed in different territories. On the 29th, the conclusions of the meeting were made known and the steps to be followed were established. The final day benefited from the presence of members from the Confederation of Native Nationalities of the Ecuador (CONAIE) and representatives from human rights organizations. After the summit meeting, a number of ethnic leaders marched through the streets of Buenos Aires, accompanied by Nobel Peace Prize Laureate Adolfo Pérez Esquivel and Pablo Pimental of the Permanent Assembly for Human Rights. A small group went to government house to hand in a petition, but after a long wait the government declined to receive them.

== Foundation of Qopiwini and camp in Buenos Aires ==
In the face of the lack of answers on the part of the government of Formosa, Félix Díaz decided to go back to the camp in Buenos Aires, and in 2010, installed the camp in the intersection between the Avenues 9th of July and Avenue of May. After five months in the camp, a dialogue was established that had little effect. The Argentine National Gendarmerie, accompanied by militants of La Cámpora, finally evicted them from the camp. Díaz affirmed that in four years none of the agreements of the round table had been realized.

In 2014, there were meetings in Las Lomitas on May 30 and 31, in Bartolomé de la Casas on July 18 and 19, in Laguna Yema on November 14 and 15, and in the neighbourhood of Nanqom in Formosa city on December 5 and 6. Several communities participated, among them: Pilagá El Perdido, La Linea, and El Simbolar, the Wichi Community of Isla Colón and Saint Martín, the Qom community, Bartolome de las Casas, the Qom community of Potae Napocna Navogoh, the Pilagá community, Rincon Bomba, Oñaidee, and Laq Fasanyie, the Nivaclé Community of Río Muerto, the Wichí community, Pozo del Mortero, Mission Laishi and Nanqom, the Wichi community of Tres Pozos Bazan, the Qom community of Mission Tacaglé, the Wichi community of Lagoon Yema, Rafael Justo, the Pilagá Federation, the Wichi community of El Potrillo and the Wichi community of Las Bolivianas.

Between January 23 and 24, 2015, there was a meeting in the Wichi community of Colorado, in the province of Formosa, where the Organisation of the Native Peoples, Qopiwini Lafwetes, was founded. Thus, after several assemblies and after an arduous debate, the unity was attained for all the villages in the Formosa province.

Following a press conference, it was announced that the protest camp would be dismantled on Sunday, December 6, after it became known that on Tuesday, December 1 that Mauricio Macri had won the presidential elections and Díaz could have a meeting with the Secretary of Human Rights, Claudio Avruj. Avruj confirmed that the future government would respond to the requests of indigenous peoples. The other reason the camp was dismantled was for the fear of attacks.

On December 17 President Macri received Félix Diaz.

== See also ==
- Indigenous peoples in Argentina
