= Relmu Ñamku =

Mapuche Argentine leader and activist (born 1977)

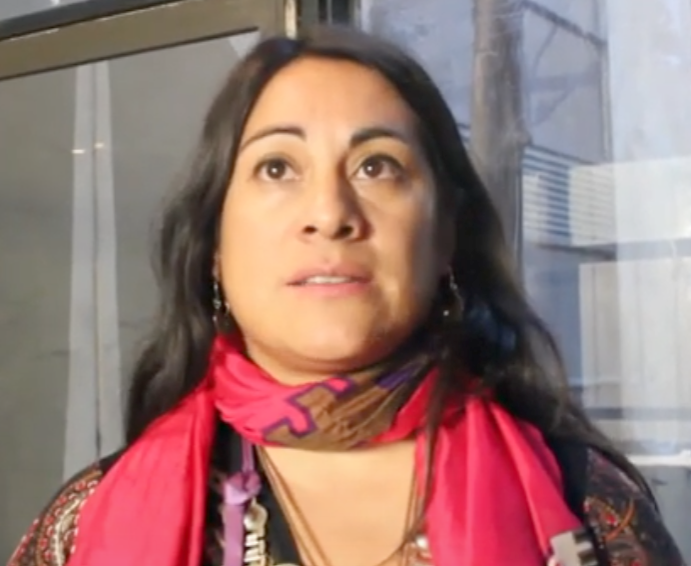
- In 2015
- Born: Carol Soaez Bullorovsky; 1977 (age 47–48); Esquel, Argentina
- Occupation(s): Indigenous leader, activist

Carol Soaez Bullorovsky more known as Relmu Ñamku (born 1977) is a Mapuche Argentine civil rights activist for indigenous peoples in Argentina and leader of the Winkul Newen community.

She was tried for attempted murder when someone threw a rock that hit a woman during an eviction attempt by a multinational oil company. For the first time, an "intercultural" jury made up of half Mapuche members ended up acquitting Ñamku.

== Career ==
Ñamku was born in 1977 in Esquel, Chubut Province, Argentina. Her mother, Marina Ñamku, gave her up for adoption due to alcoholism problems. Her adoptive parents, Héctor Soae and Silvia Bullorovsky, always made sure she knew about her Mapuche heritage and who her biological mother was. Ñamku studied indigenous cultures at university and after graduating she moved to the province of Neuquén to learn about the reality of the Mapuche people, where she began working at a school. She became leader of the Winkul Newen Mapuche community.

On 28 December 2012, Judicial Assistant Verónica Pelayes traveled to Portezuelo Chico, thirty kilometers from Zapala, Neuquén, with a court order to evict the Mapuche community of Winkul Newen, who were blocking access to their territory. The court order was intended to facilitate the entry of the Apache oil company and police into the community's territory. At some point, a member of the Mapuche community threw a stone that injured Pelayes, who suffered a broken nose. Relmu, Martín Velázquez Maliqueo, and Mauricio Rain were charged for the incident. At first, Relmu was charged only with "assault," but later the charge was changed to "attempted murder".

Prosecutor Sandra González Taboada proposed changing the charge against Relmu Ñamku from "attempted murder" to "serious injury." Community lawyer Emanuel Roa explained that none of the eight eyewitnesses (police officers and oil company employees) identified Ñamku as the person responsible for injuring Verónica Pelayes. Relmu Ñamku could have been sentenced to fifteen years in prison. According to prosecutor Sandra González Taboada, Ñamku was the one who threw the stone that injured Verónica Pelayes. During the six days of hearings, more than fifteen witnesses testified, but none—except Ñamku—identified her as the person responsible for throwing the stone. In addition, two doctors confirmed that Pelayes' life was never in danger. It was the first trial in Latin America with an intercultural jury, as half of the jurors were Mapuche. Relmu Ñamku, Martín Maliqueo, and Mauricio Rain, who were charged, were all acquitted.

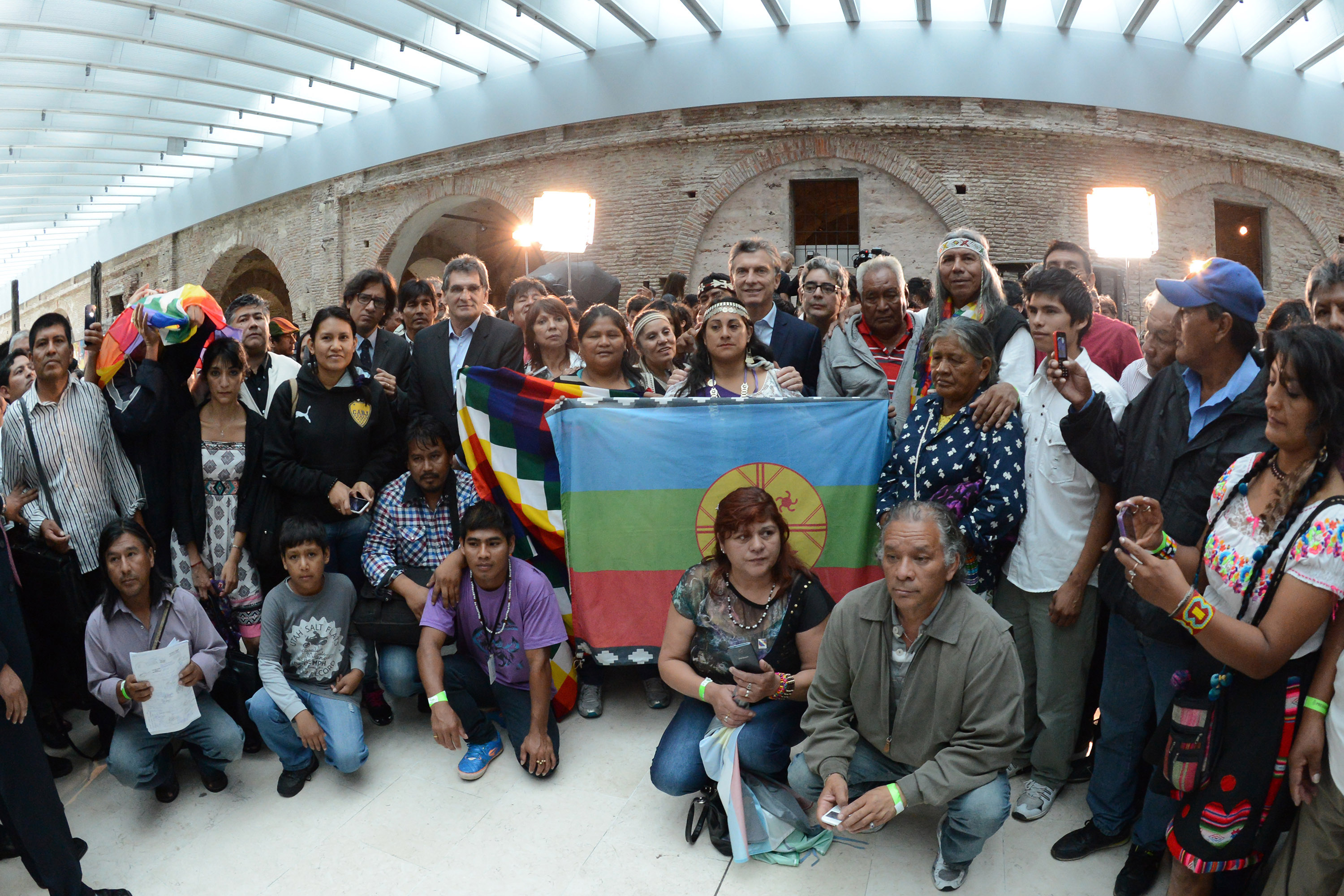
President Mauricio Macri behind Relmu Ñamku on 17 December 2015

President Mauricio Macri received Relmu Ñamku and Félix Díaz on 17 December 2015, along with other leaders, one week after taking office as President of Argentina.
