= Chaguaya =

Coordinates: 15.7936°S 69.0394°W

- Town
- Interactive map of Chaguaya
- Country: Bolivia
- Department: La Paz Department
- Province: Eliodoro Camacho Province
- Municipality: Puerto Carabuco Municipality
- Time zone: UTC-4 (BOT)

Chaguaya is a small town in Bolivia. In 2009 it had an estimated population of 858.

== History ==
There was a large zinc mine in Chaguaya, owned by german bolivian businessman Moritz Hochschild until 1952. In 1986 the mine was closed.

== Climate ==
Climate data for Cañas, Tarija, elevation 2,030 m (6,660 ft), (1977–2015)
Month	Jan	Feb	Mar	Apr	May	Jun	Jul	Aug	Sep	Oct	Nov	Dec	Year
Mean daily maximum °C (°F)	25.0 (77.0)	24.5 (76.1)	24.3 (75.7)	23.7 (74.7)	23.3 (73.9)	24.0 (75.2)	23.4 (74.1)	24.8 (76.6)	25.6 (78.1)	26.0 (78.8)	25.6 (78.1)	25.8 (78.4)	24.7 (76.4)
Daily mean °C (°F)	19.5 (67.1)	19.0 (66.2)	18.7 (65.7)	17.1 (62.8)	14.3 (57.7)	13.5 (56.3)	13.1 (55.6)	14.8 (58.6)	16.4 (61.5)	18.6 (65.5)	18.9 (66.0)	19.6 (67.3)	17.0 (62.5)
Mean daily minimum °C (°F)	14.0 (57.2)	13.6 (56.5)	13.1 (55.6)	10.5 (50.9)	5.8 (42.4)	3.0 (37.4)	3.0 (37.4)	5.0 (41.0)	7.4 (45.3)	11.4 (52.5)	12.5 (54.5)	13.4 (56.1)	9.4 (48.9)
Average precipitation mm (inches)	163.0 (6.42)	144.8 (5.70)	132.8 (5.23)	33.6 (1.32)	3.4 (0.13)	0.5 (0.02)	0.5 (0.02)	3.6 (0.14)	11.2 (0.44)	54.4 (2.14)	80.7 (3.18)	126.2 (4.97)	754.7 (29.71)
Average precipitation days	15.6	14.1	13.4	5.9	1.4	0.6	0.3	0.9	2.0	7.1	10.2	13	84.5
Source: Servicio Nacional de Meteorología e Hidrología de Bolivia
