= Félix Díaz (cacique) =

Argentine indigenous rights activist

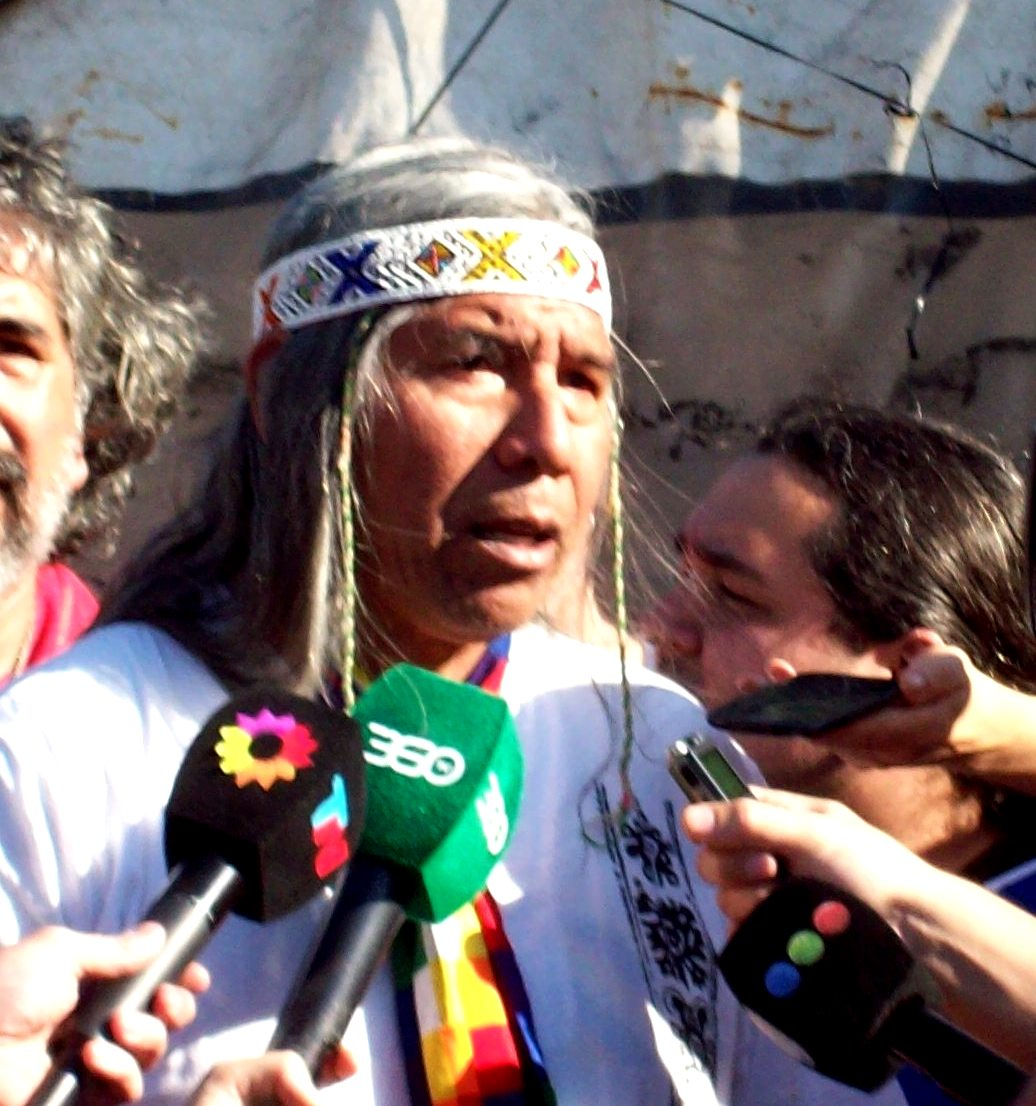
Félix Díaz

Félix Díaz (born 28 December 1959) is an Argentine activist on behalf of the civil rights of the Qom people in Argentina. He is the qarashé (Note: Equivalent to cacique, leader among indigenous people) of the Potae Napocna Navogoh, also known as Colonia La Primavera in the province of Formosa. The Spanish newspaper El País named him among the 100 most outstanding Iberoamerican people of 2011. Since July 2016 he has been president of the Consultative and Participative Council of Indigenous People.

== Biography ==
=== Early life ===
Félix Díaz grew up in the Qom community of Potae Napoqna Navogoh (Colonia la Primavera). He joined the army, where he learned to read and write. He was on duty in Rosario during the 1978 World Cup, and took part in military exercises in the confrontation with Chile in the Beagle conflict of 1979. He decided not to remain in the army on learning of the abuses it was committing against Argentine civilians. He was a Mormon pastor, public employee, and an official of the Institute against Discrimination (INADI). During the December 2001 economic crisis he coordinated a local bartering scheme.

=== Land conflict of 2010 ===
The governor of Formosa, Gildo Insfrán, in 2010 promoted the construction of a student institute attached to the National University of Formosa, to be built near the Pilcomayo national park. The Qom community of La Primavera claimed to have title to this land, and conflict broke out on commencement of the work. Díaz and other Qom residents closed the National Route 86 road as a protest, arguing that the Argentine constitution granted indigenous peoples the rights to their ancestral lands. The construction works were halted pending a decision of the Argentine Supreme Court. On 23 November 2010, while Díaz and other Qom were holding a demonstration on the site, members of a family named Celía arrived to claim that they had title to the land. There were incidents and shots were fired, with Qom and police both complaining of aggression against them. While the provincial police were removing obstructions on the route, a Qom, Roberto López, and a police officer were killed. Díaz and 23 other Qom faced criminal charges of occupying and taking over lands.

After these incidents, Díaz and his community moved their protest to the city of Buenos Aires, but no public or governmental body paid attention to the issue, with the exception of Florencio Randazzo who met Félix Díaz. Pope Francis, concerned by the seriousness of the events, also met Díaz. In spite of these meetings, the threats to the Qom did not cease.

The Supreme Court of Justice arranged a public hearing for 7 March 2012, which set out the issues regarding the territories and the violence against the natives. Díaz' defense lawyer argued that the prosecution had ignored the evidence presented by Díaz, accepting only the police testimonies. In April 2012, the case against Díaz and the 23 members of the community was dismissed for lack of evidence. In November the Court of Appeal of Resistencia withdrew the charges against Díaz and Amanda Asikak in relation to the cutting of the route, the judges holding that that was the only means of protest available to the aborigines. In 2014, Díaz presented the cause of indigenous peoples in Argentina before the United Nations in New York. The same year, the "Abya Yala" Commission for Free Peoples (Junta Abya Yala por los Pueblos Libres, JALP) gave Díaz its Conciencia ("Awareness") Award.

=== Threats and incidents ===
In August 2012, Díaz was run over by a van while riding his motorcycle. According to witnesses, the vehicle that hit the cacique was the property of the family claiming the land. The Interamerican Commission on Human Rights requested the Argentine authorities to take steps to ensure the safety of Díaz and his community, noting that despite a police presence, further threats had been made against the community.

In January 2013, Juan Daniel Asijak, Díaz' 16-year-old nephew, died following a road accident. He had been struck by a piece of rusty iron that did not seem to have resulted from the accident, and the family suspected murder. Two other Qom people died in similar incidents around this time.

=== Qopiwini protest camp ===
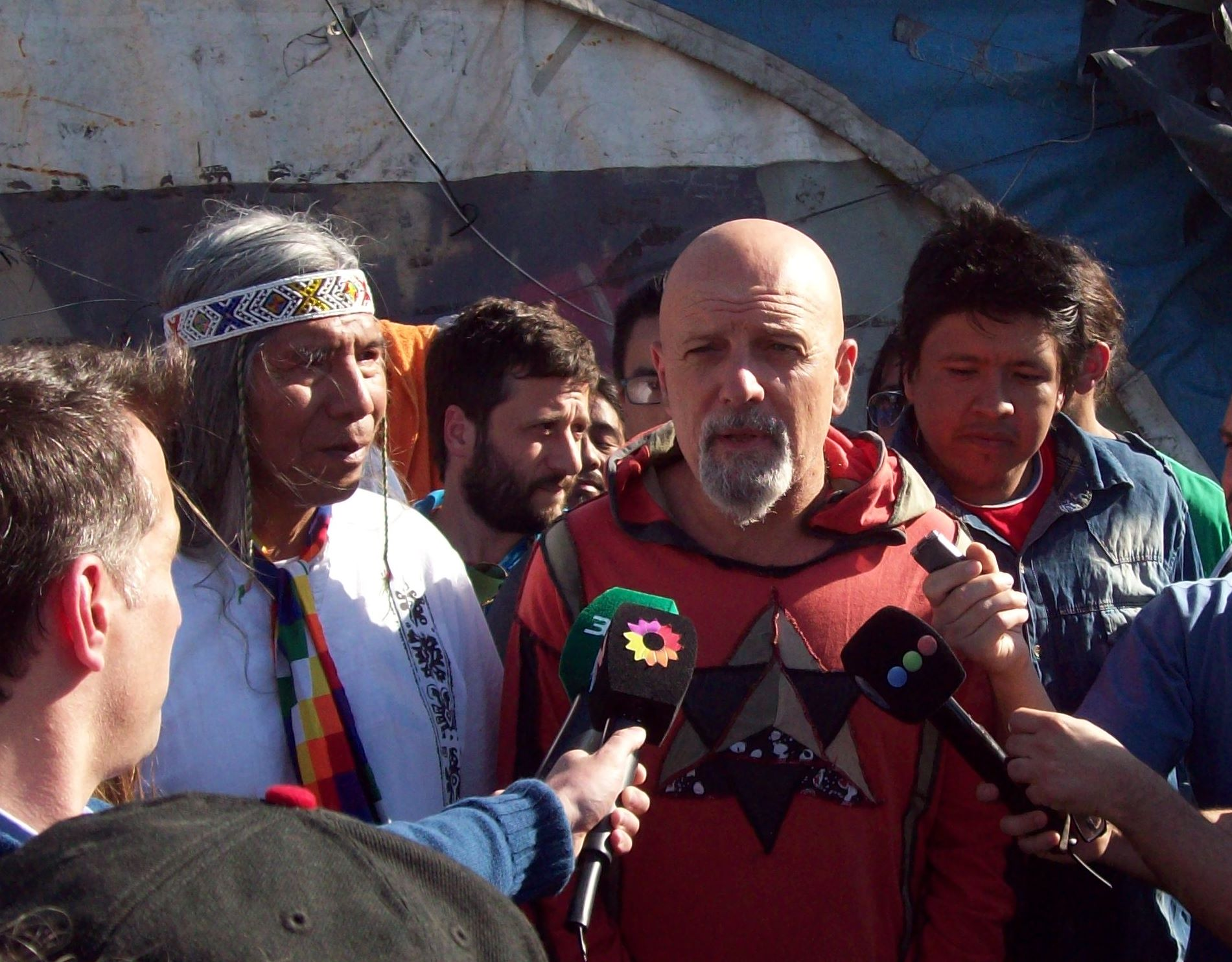
Félix Díaz with the Argentine musician Gustavo Cordera at the Qom camp in Buenos Aires, 2015

At the end of February 2015, Félix Díaz and protestors from the Qom and other indigenous groups from Formosa – Pilagá, Wichí and Nivaclé – set up a protest camp at the junction of Avenida 9 de Julio and Avenida de Mayo in Buenos Aires. They were allied in a campaign known as Qopiwini, and the aims of the protest were to condemn the actions of the Formosa provincial government and obtain signatures from citizens supporting their cause.

Díaz proclaimed that after four years, agreements reached had not been implemented. Amnesty International demanded that the Argentine state should protect the territorial integrity of the community. The camp drew the attention of international media, including The Guardian. In April someone on a motorcycle threw a Molotov cocktail at one of the tents. Around the same time unidentified persons broke into Radio Qom in Formosa and destroyed equipment. On 1 July the camp was surrounded by over 100 officers of the Federal Police. Díaz stated that there was no violence on the part of the organizers, even though no official had appeared with an eviction order. After the news was reported in the media, a number of human rights campaigners including Adolfo Pérez Esquivel and Nora Cortiñas to express solidarity with the protestors.

The Argentine musician Gustavo Cordera visited the camp on 1 September. He told the media that he supported the protest, and performed three songs. Díaz also appeared on the television program Intratables.

The then presidential candidate Mauricio Macri visited the camp on 3 November and was interviewed by Díaz. Macri promised to satisfy some of the indigenous peoples' demands if he became president. Díaz requested that the other candidate Daniel Scioli should also visit, but this did not take place. Díaz told the media: "Macri did not ask for our votes or our support for his candidacy... he promised to make progress on indigenous rights".

=== Meeting with Macri ===
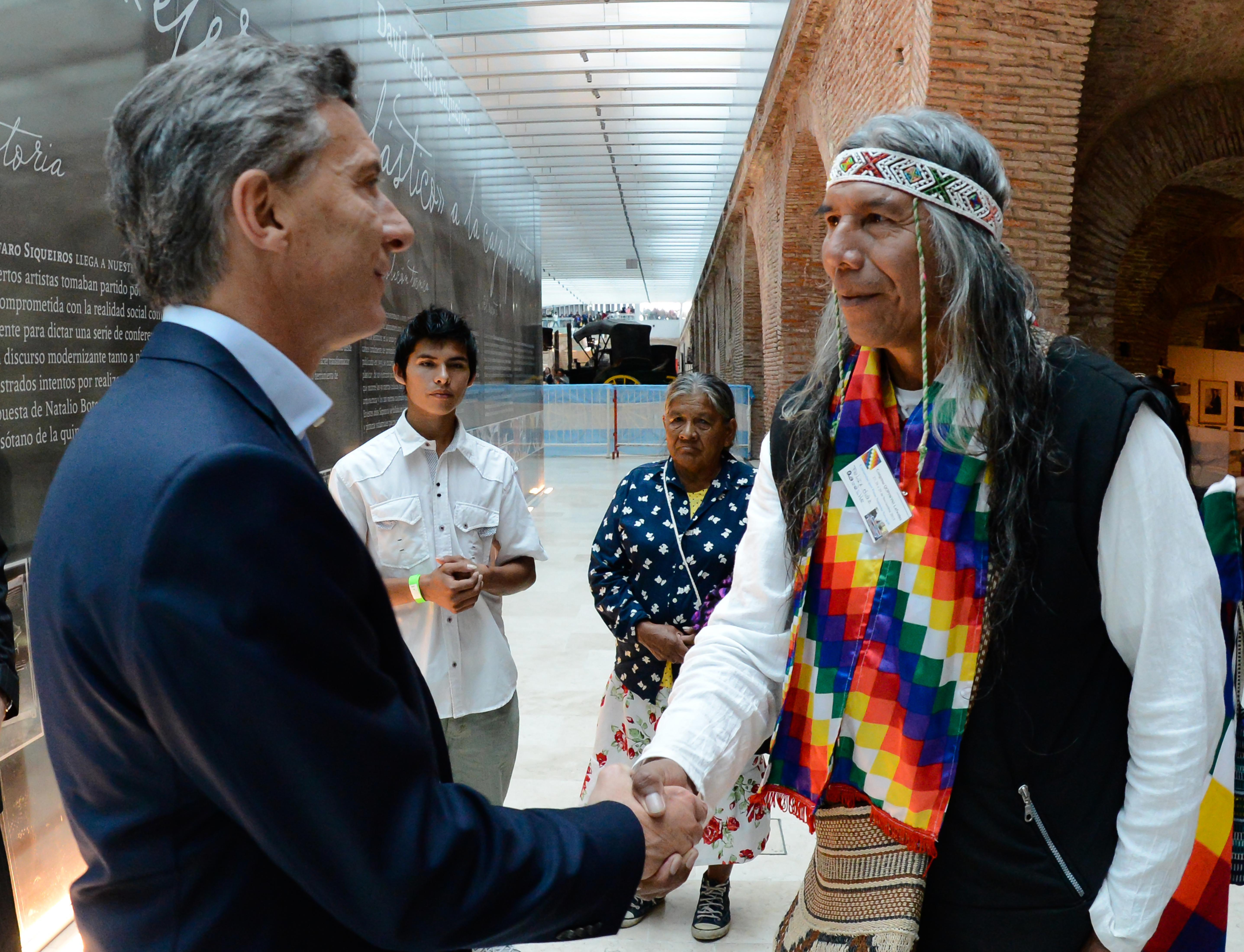
President Macri meets Félix Díaz.

After Macri won the presidential elections, Díaz was granted an interview on 1 December 2015 with Claudio Avruj, secretary for human rights. Avruj confirmed that the new government would respond to the demands of the indigenous peoples. The dismantling of the camp on 6 December was announced at a press conference. There was also fear of attacks on the camp at a demonstration planned for 10 December by supporters of the former president Cristina Fernández de Kirchner, some of whom had already mounted attacks.

Macri met Díaz, Relmu Ñamku, and other indigenous representatives on 17 December. Díaz was not appointed president of INAI (Instituto Nacional de Asuntos Indígenas, National Institute of Indigenous Affairs) in February 2016, as had been expected. Díaz stated in an interview that according to his agreement with Macri, financial irregularities relating to INAI would be cleared up, and the body would be led by an indigenous person. Díaz also stressed that as of then the situation of indigenous peoples had hardly changed.

=== Indigenous Council ===
Díaz and people from other communities again set up a camp on 15 March 2016, this time in the former detention center ESMA, hoping for a meeting with Claudio Avruj, the Secretary for Human Rights. Díaz stated that the government was not keeping its promises. In late March, Avruj reached an agreement with indigenous leaders to create a Consultative and Participative Council for Indigenous Peoples (Consejo Consultivo y Participativo de los Pueblos Indígenas). Claudio Avruj stated that by this agreement the indigenous representatives would end the camp at ESMA and would abstain from further similar protests as long as channels for dialogue remained open. This Council was inaugurated on 15 July 2016, with Díaz appointed president.

== See also ==
- Indigenous peoples in Argentina

== Bibliography ==
- Elías, Néstor (2010). Los pies en el barro ("Feet in the mud"). Publishing Corregidor. ISBN 9789500518529.
