= Napalpí =

Coordinates: 26°54′S 60°08′W

- Municipality and village
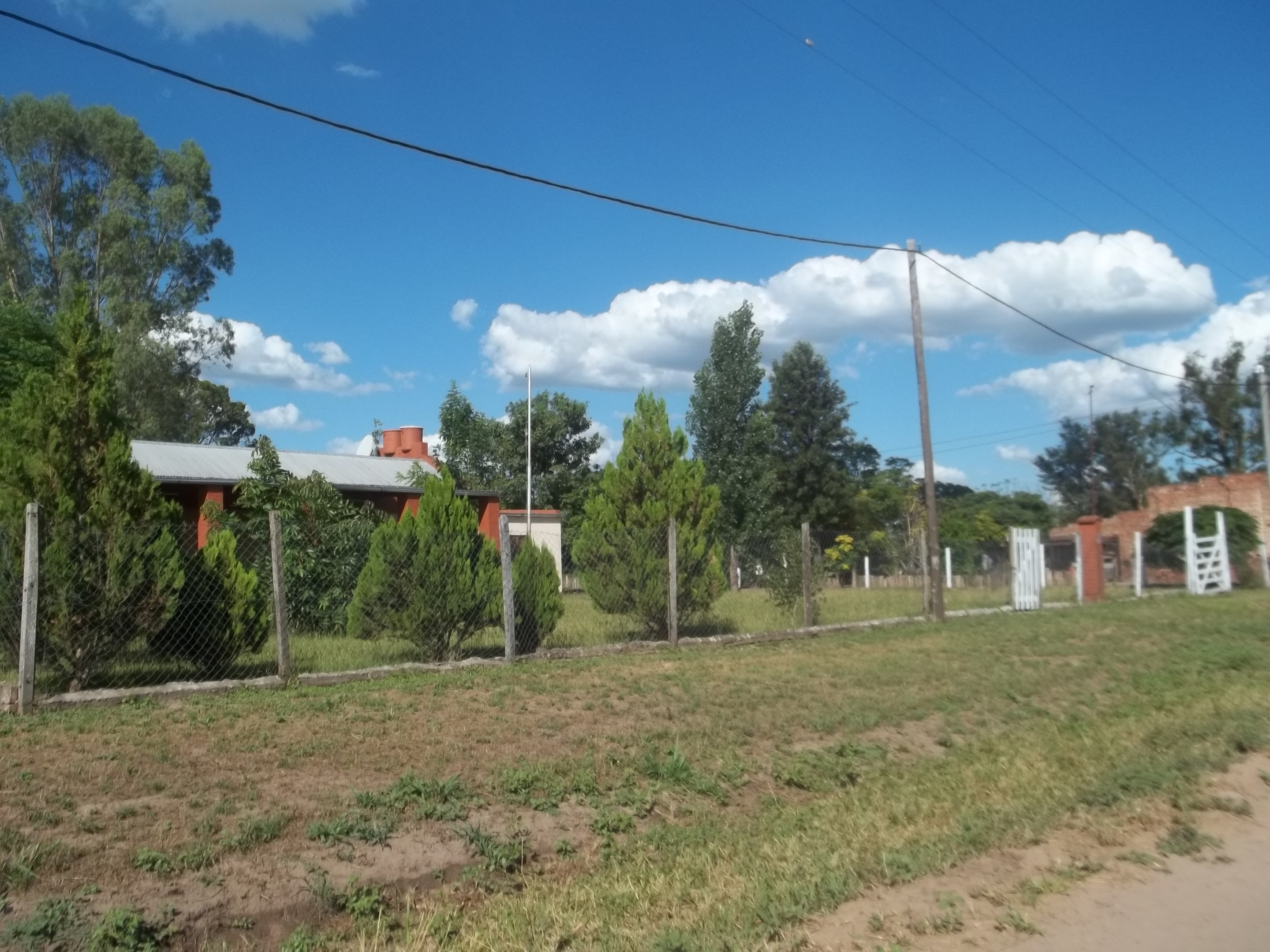
- School in Napalpí
- Interactive map of Napalpí
- Country: Argentina
- Province: Chaco Province
- Time zone: UTC−3 (ART)

Napalpí is a village and municipality in Chaco Province in northern Argentina.
