= Villa Río Bermejito =

Coordinates: 25°38′14″S 60°15′56″W

- Municipality and village
- Interactive map of Villa Río Bermejito
- Country: Argentina
- Province: Chaco Province
- Time zone: UTC−3 (ART)

Villa Río Bermejito is a village and municipality in Chaco Province in northern Argentina.
