= Guarani language =

Indigenous language of South America

Guarani
- Paraguayan Guarani
- avañe'ẽ
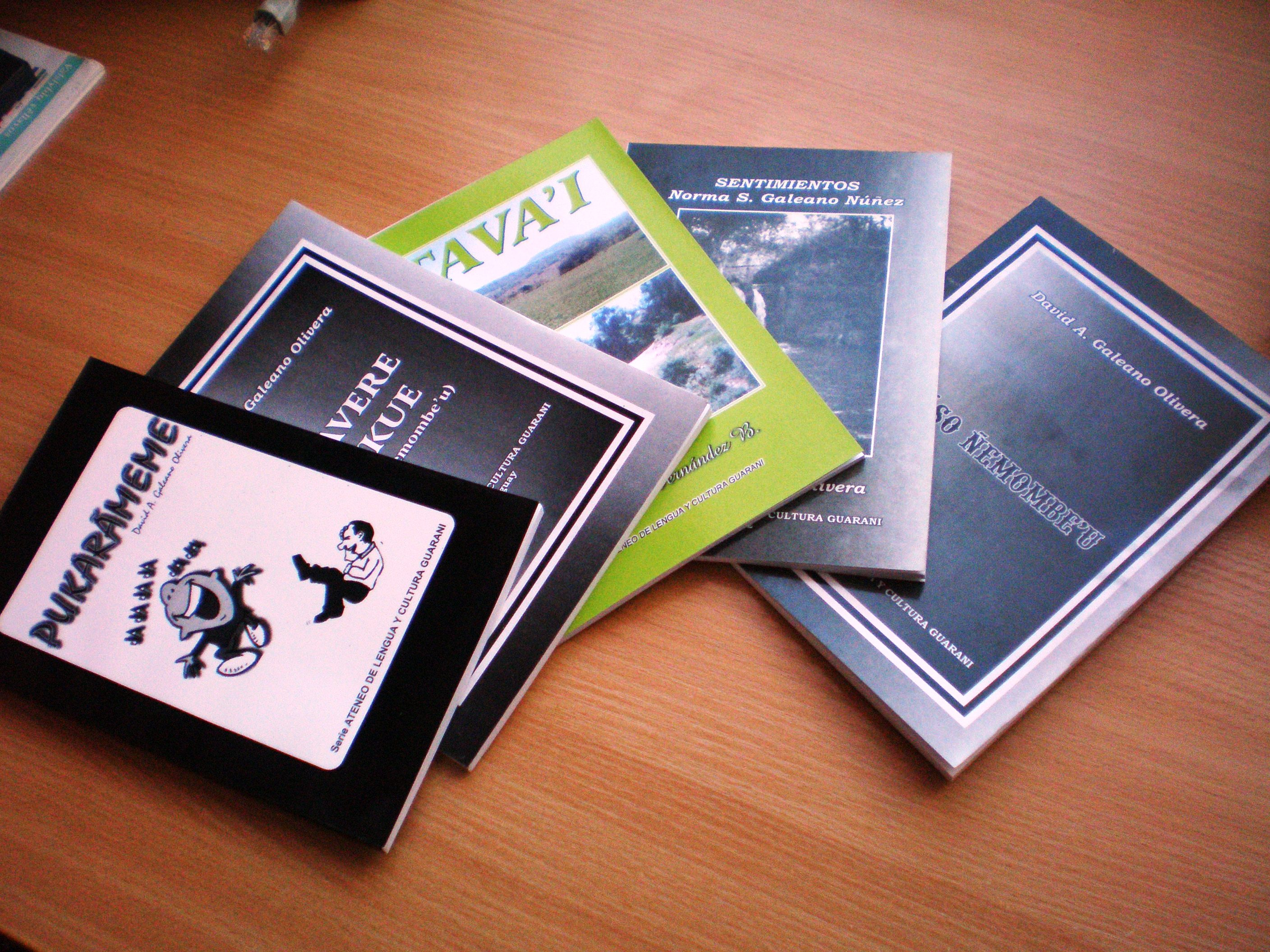
- Books in Guarani
- Native to: Paraguay
- Ethnicity: Guaraní; Paraguayan people
- Native speakers: 6.5 million (2020)
- Language family: Tupian: Tupi–Guarani; Guarani (I); Guarani
- Dialects: Jopará
- Writing system: Guarani alphabet (Latin script); Guarani Braille

Official status
- Official language in: Paraguay Bolivia Argentina (Corrientes Province) Brazil (Tacuru)
- Regulated by: Academia de la Lengua Guaraní (Guarani Ñe'ẽ Rerekuapavẽ)

Language codes
- ISO 639-3: gug
- Glottolog: para1311
- Linguasphere: 88-AAI-f

A Guarani speaker

Guarani (avañe'ẽ) (Note: /ˌɡwɑːrəˈniː, ˈɡwɑːrəni/ GWAR-ə-NEE, GWAR-ə-nee; avañe'ẽ "the people's language"), or Paraguayan Guarani, is a Tupian language belonging to the Tupi–Guarani branch of South America. It is one of the two official languages of Paraguay (along with Spanish), where it is spoken by the majority of the population, and where half of the rural population are monolingual speakers of the language.

Guarani is one of the most widely spoken Native American languages and remains commonly used among the Paraguayan people and neighboring communities. This is unique among American languages; language shift towards European colonial languages (in this case, the other official language of Spanish) has otherwise been a nearly universal phenomenon in the Western Hemisphere, but Paraguayans have maintained their traditional language while also adopting Spanish. In South America, the indigenous language that is most widely spoken amongst non-indigenous communities is Guaraní. There are more than four million speakers of Guaraní across these regions.

The name "Guarani" is generally used for the official language of Paraguay. However, this is part of a dialect chain, most of whose components are also often called Guarani.

== Geographical distribution ==
Variants of the language are spoken by communities in neighboring countries including parts of northeastern Argentina, southeastern Bolivia and southwestern Brazil. It is the second official language of the Argentine province of Corrientes since 2004 and the Brazilian city of Tacuru since 2010. Guarani is also one of the three official languages of Mercosur, alongside Spanish and Portuguese.

== Status ==
The United Nations Educational, Scientific and Cultural Organization (UNESCO) classified Guaraní's language vitality as "vulnerable". UNESCO's definition of "vulnerable" is meant to highlight that although the majority of Guaraní children can speak Guaraní, the use of the language is restricted to particular contexts (e.g., familial settings). In 2002, 28% of Paraguayans were monolingual Guaraní speakers, but by 2022 only 12% were. On the other hand, Spanish monolingualism did not rise over the same period, indicating the continued vivacity of Guaraní in a multilingual population.

Although the Guaraní language may only be classified as "vulnerable," there are other languages within the Tupí-Guaraní branch that are classified as "extinct" and "critically endangered" (e.g., Amanayé and Anambé respectively).

== Documentation ==
Because Guaraní was only written down after the arrival of Jesuit missionaries, earlier stages in the history of the language can only be reconstructed by comparison with other related languages.

Written records of the language begin with the work of the Jesuits Antonio Ruiz de Montoya and Alonso de Aragona. Ringmacher identifies Ruiz de Montoya's Arte de la lengua Guaraní (1640), a grammar of Guaraní, as the seminal point of reference and departure for all subsequent grammatical works concerning the Guaraní language. Montoya's analysis of the Guaraní morphology and syntax stands accurate until this day. Montoya also produced a Guaraní dictionary known as Tesoro de la Lengua Guaraní (1639). In this work, he not only created the first dictionary of this kind, but also provided examples of contexts in which to use the various words he documented. Lastly, Jesuit Alonso de Aragona produced a pedagogical grammar that was completed in 1629, but only printed in 1979. The intention of Aragona's work was to help those seeking ways to learn Guaraní.

The extensive research conducted as well as the expansive reach of the Guaraní language across Latin America has granted it an important position in the urban landscape. In other words, Guaraní's official status in Paraguay combined with research studies that have followed has allowed for recent projects of standardization.

== History ==
While Guarani, in its Classical form, was the only language spoken in the expansive missionary territories, Paraguayan Guarani has its roots outside of the Jesuit Reductions.

Modern scholarship has shown that Guarani was always the primary language of colonial Paraguay, both inside and outside the reductions. Following the expulsion of the Jesuits in the 18th century, the residents of the reductions gradually migrated north and west towards Asunción, a demographic shift that brought about a decidedly one-sided shift away from the Jesuit dialect that the missionaries had curated in the southern and eastern territories of the colony.

By and large, the Guarani of the Jesuits shied away from direct phonological loans from Spanish. Instead, the missionaries relied on the agglutinative nature of the language to formulate new precise translations or calque terms from Guarani morphemes. This process often led the Jesuits to employ complicated, highly synthetic terms to convey European concepts. By contrast, the Guarani spoken outside of the missions was characterized by a free, unregulated frequently, Spanish words and phrases were simply incorporated into Guarani with minimal phonological adaptation.

A good example of that phenomenon is found in the word "communion". The Jesuits, using their agglutinative strategy, rendered this word "Tupârahava", a calque based on the word "Tupâ", meaning God. In modern Paraguayan Guarani, the same word is rendered "komuño".

Following the out-migration from the reductions, these two distinct dialects of Guarani came into extensive contact for the first time. The vast majority of speakers abandoned the less colloquial, highly regulated Jesuit variant in favor of the variety that evolved from actual use by speakers in Paraguay. This contemporary form of spoken Guarani is known as Jopará, meaning "mixture" in Guarani.

=== Political status ===
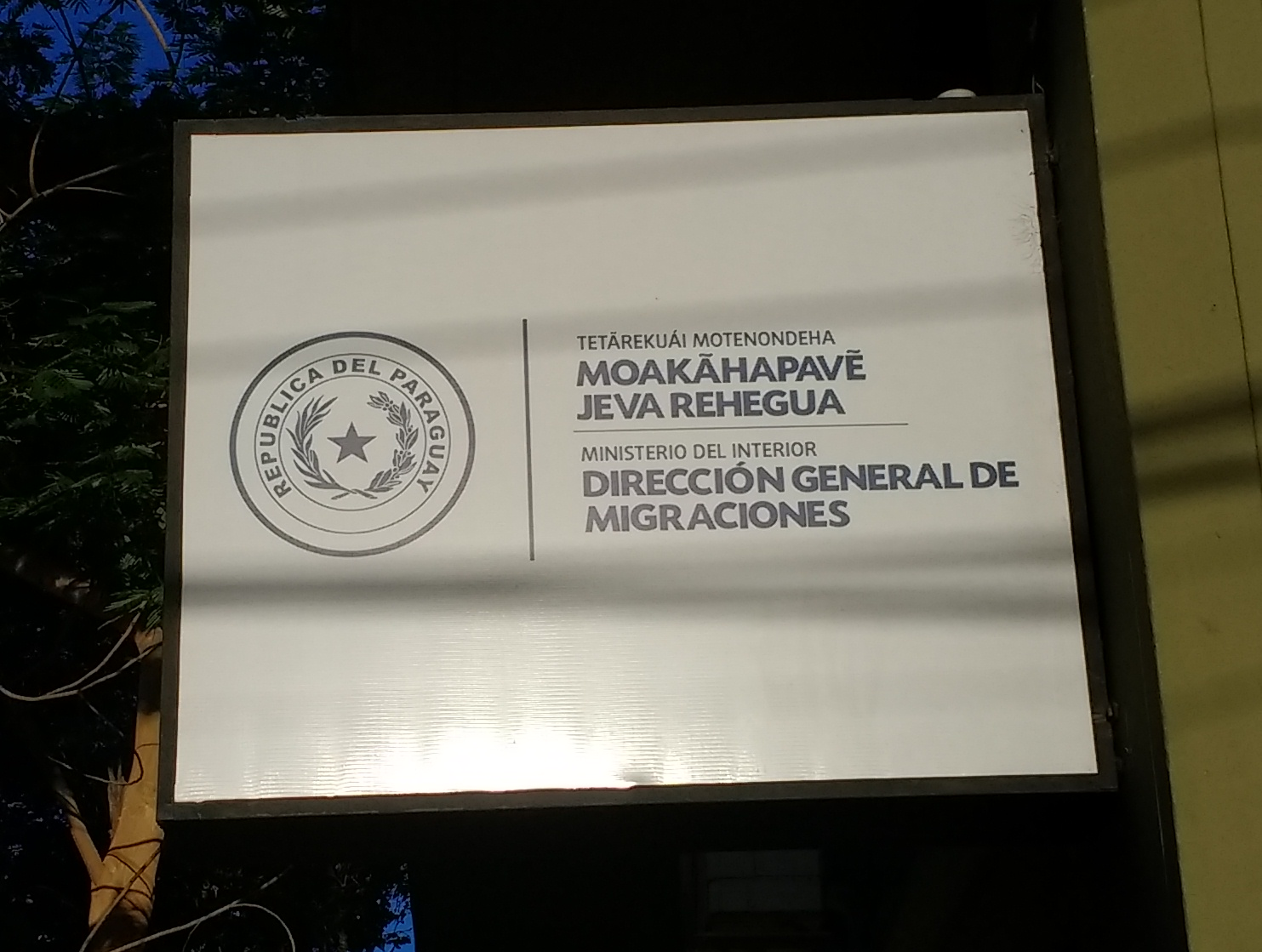
A government sign in Asunción, Paraguay; bilingual in Guarani and Spanish

==== Within Paraguay ====
Widely spoken, Paraguayan Guarani has nevertheless been repressed by Paraguayan governments throughout most of its history since independence. It was prohibited in state schools for over 100 years. However, populists often used pride in the language to excite nationalistic fervor and promote a narrative of social unity.

During the autocratic regime of Alfredo Stroessner, his Colorado Party used the language to appeal to common Paraguayans although Stroessner himself never gave an address in Guarani. Upon the advent of Paraguayan democracy in 1992, Guarani was established in the new constitution as a language equal to Spanish.

Jopara, a mixture of Spanish and Guarani, is spoken by an estimated 90% of the population of Paraguay. Code-switching between the two languages takes place on a spectrum in which more Spanish is used for official and business-related matters, and more Guarani is used in art and in everyday life.

==== Outside Paraguay ====
Guarani is also an official language of Bolivia.

In 2010, the Brazilian town of Tacuru, Mato Grosso do Sul adopted Guarani as a co-official language. In 2022, Coronel Sapucaia, another town in Mato Grasso do Sul, adopted Guarani as a co-official language.

In 2025, Jorge Macri, the head of government of Buenos Aires, Argentina, announced Guarani would be introduced at primary schools. He made the decision following a meeting with Paraguayan president Santiago Peña. In 2026, the town of Caá Catí, Corrientes Province, Argentina, adopted Guarani as a co-official language.

== Phonology ==
Guarani syllables consist of a consonant plus a vowel or a vowel alone; syllables ending in a consonant or containing two or more consonants together do not occur. This is represented as (C)V.

The consonant phonemes are represented below in the International Phonetic Alphabet. The orthography is given in angle brackets.

=== Consonants ===
Guarani consonants
		Labial	Alveolar	Palatal (-alveolar)	Velar		Glottal
		Labial	Alveolar	Palatal (-alveolar)	plain	labial	Glottal
Nasal		ᵐb ~ m ⟨mb, m⟩	ⁿd ~ n ⟨nd, n⟩	ʝ ~ ɲ ⟨j, ñ⟩	ᵑɡ ~ ŋ ⟨ng, g̃⟩	ᵑɡʷ ~ ŋʷ ⟨ngu, g̃u⟩	
Stop	voiced	ᵐb ~ m ⟨mb, m⟩	ⁿd ~ n ⟨nd, n⟩	ʝ ~ ɲ ⟨j, ñ⟩	ᵑɡ ~ ŋ ⟨ng, g̃⟩	ᵑɡʷ ~ ŋʷ ⟨ngu, g̃u⟩	
Stop	voiceless	p	t		k	kʷ ⟨ku⟩	ʔ ⟨'⟩
Fricative			s	ʃ ⟨ch⟩	x ~ h ⟨h⟩		
Approximant		ʋ ~ ʋ̃ ⟨v⟩	l ~ l̃ ⟨l⟩		ɰ ~ ɰ̃ ⟨g⟩	w ~ w̃ ⟨gu⟩	
Tap			ɾ ~ ɾ̃ ⟨r⟩				

The voiced consonants have oral allophones (left) before oral vowels, and nasal allophones (right) before nasal vowels. The oral allophones of the voiced stops are prenasalized.

Some linguists additionally include the phoneme /ⁿt/ (written ⟨nt⟩), though it is considered controversial as it appears exclusively in the suffix -nte. Nonetheless, it is typically included in the Guarani alphabet.

Oral /ʝ/ may be realized as [j], [ɟ], [ɟʝ], [dʒ], [ʒ], depending on the word and speaker, but the nasal allophone is always [ɲ].

The palato-alveolar sibilant /ʃ/ is often articulated closer to alveolo-palatal [ɕ].

The dorsal fricative is in free variation between [x] and [h].

The approximant /ɰ/ may be nasalized [ɰ̃] and partially labialized [ɰʷ], and may also be realized as a fricative [ɣʷ] or a fully labialized approximant [w]. (Note: Walker (1999) does not make a distinction between [ɰʷ] and [w], while Estigarribia (2020) does. While noted as possible, neither source provides an example of the nasalized approximant occurring without labialization.)

From Spanish loanwords, what had originally been a typical alveolar trill /r/ (written ⟨rr⟩) became a retroflex sibilant /ʐ/. The alveolar lateral /l/ also entered Guarani phonology through Spanish loanwords, but is now a typical phoneme (unlike /ʐ/, which is considered marginal). The consonants /f/, /ð/, and /ʎ/ may also appear in loanwords.

All syllables are open, viz. CV or V, ending in a vowel.

=== Glottal stop ===
The glottal stop, called puso in Guarani, is only written between vowels, but occurs phonetically before vowel-initial words. Because of this, some words have several glottal stops near each other that consequently undergo a number of different dissimilation techniques. For example, "I drink water" 'a'y'u is pronounced hay'u. This suggests that irregularity in verb forms derives from regular sound change processes in the history of Guarani. There also seems to be some degree of variation between how much the glottal stop is dropped (for example aru'uka > aruuka > aruka for "I have something brought"). It is possible that word-internal glottal stops may have been retained from fossilized compounds where the second component was a vowel-initial (and therefore glottal stop–initial) root.

=== Vowels ===
/a, e, i, o, u/ correspond more or less to the Spanish equivalents, although sometimes the open-mid allophones [ɛ, ɔ] are used more frequently in Guarani. The grapheme ⟨y⟩ represents the vowel /ɨ/. (Note: Instead of a close central unrounded vowel /ɨ/, some sources, such as Walker (1999), note a near-close near-back unrounded vowel, transcribed with /ɯ/.) Considering nasality, the vowel system is perfectly symmetrical, each oral vowel having a nasal counterpart (many systems with nasals have fewer nasals than orals).

	Front		Central		Back	
	oral	nasal	oral	nasal	oral	nasal
Close	i	ĩ	ɨ	ɨ̃	u	ũ
Mid	e	ẽ			o	õ
Open			a	ã		

==== Nasal harmony ====
Guarani displays an unusual degree of nasal harmony. A nasal syllable consists of a nasal vowel, and if the consonant is voiced, it takes its nasal allophone. If a stressed syllable is nasal, the nasality spreads in both directions until it bumps up against a stressed syllable that is oral. This includes affixes, postpositions, and compounding. Voiceless consonants do not have nasal allophones, but they do not interrupt the spread of nasality.

For example,

/ⁿdo+ɾoi+ⁿduˈpã+i/ → [nõɾ̃õĩnũˈpãĩ]
/ro+ᵐbo+poˈrã/ → [ɾ̃õmõpõˈɾ̃ã]

However, a second stressed syllable, with an oral vowel, will not become nasalized:

/ʔijaˈkãɾaˈku/ → [ʔĩɲãˌkãɾ̃ãˈku]
/ʔaˈkãɾaˈwe/ → [ʔãˌkãɾ̃ãˈwe]

That is, for a word with a single stressed vowel, all voiced segments will be either oral or nasal, while voiceless consonants are unaffected, as in oral [ᵐboˈtɨ] vs nasal [mõˈtɨ̃].

== Orthography ==
Achegety
Majuscule forms (also called uppercase or capital letters)
A	Ã	Ch	E	Ẽ	G	G̃	H	I	Ĩ	J	K	L	M	Mb	N	Nd	Ng	Nt	Ñ	O	Õ	P	R	Rr	S	T	U	Ũ	V	Y	Ỹ	'
Minuscule forms (also called lowercase or small letters)
a	ã	ch	e	ẽ	g	g̃	h	i	ĩ	j	k	l	m	mb	n	nd	ng	nt	ñ	o	õ	p	r	rr	s	t	u	ũ	v	y	ỹ	'
IPA phonemes
a	ã	ʃ~ɕ	e	ẽ	ɰ~ɣ	ŋ	h	i	ĩ	ʝ~dʒ	k	l	m	ᵐb	n	ⁿd	ᵑɡ	ⁿt	ɲ	o	õ	p	ɾ	ʐ	s	t	u	ũ	ʋ	ɨ	ɨ̃	ʔ

Sounds which only become nasalized due to nasal harmony are typically written as their phonemic values rather than their phonetic ones. For example, if a vowel is not 'canonically' nasal, but is under context of nasal harmony, it is still written without a diacritic.

== Morphology ==
Guarani is highly agglutinative, often classified as polysynthetic with noun incorporation. It has split-S alignment, and it has been classified as a 6th class language in Milewski's typology. It uses subject–verb–object (SVO) word order usually, but object–verb when the subject is not specified.

Polysynthetic Guarani constructions often have analytic paraphrases in the modern language that keep the words separate and are more frequently used by speakers.

Examples
Polysynthetic	Analytic
o- juru- mboty 3.ACT- mouth- close 's/he closes/closed his/her mouth'	o- mboty i- juru 3.ACT- close 3.INACT- mouth 's/he closes/closed his/her mouth'

=== Verb ===
Guarani stems can be divided into a number of conjugation classes, which are called areal (with the subclass aireal) and chendal. The names for these classes stem from the names of the prefixes for 1st and 2nd person singular.

The areal conjugation is used to convey that the participant is actively involved, whereas the chendal conjugation is used to convey that the participant is the undergoer. However, the areal conjugation is also used if an intransitive verb expresses an event as opposed to a state, for example manó 'die', and even with a verb such as ké 'sleep'. In addition, all borrowed Spanish verbs are adopted as areal as opposed to borrowed adjectives, which take chendal. Intransitive verbs can take either conjugation, transitive verbs normally take areal, but can take chendal for habitual readings. Nouns can also be conjugated, but only as chendal. This conveys a predicative possessive reading.

Furthermore, the conjugations vary slightly according to the stem being oral or nasal.

pronoun	areal		aireal	chendal
pronoun	oral	nasal	aireal	chendal
pronoun	guata 'to walk'	ñe'ẽ 'to speak'	puru 'to use'	porã 'to be beautiful'
che	a-guata	a-ñe'ẽ	ai-puru	che-porã
ñande	ja-guata	ña-ñe'ẽ	jai-puru	ñane-porã
ore	ro-guata	ro-ñe'ẽ	roi-puru	ore-porã
nde	re-guata	re-ñe'ẽ	rei-puru	ne-porã
peẽ	pe-guata	pe-ñe'ẽ	pei-puru	pene-porã
ha'e(kuéra)	o-guata	o-ñe'ẽ	oi-puru	i-porã

==== Negation ====
Negation is indicated by a circumfix n(d)(V)-...-(r)i in Guarani. The preverbal portion of the circumfix is nd- for oral bases and n- for nasal bases. For 2nd person singular, an epenthetic -e- is inserted before the base, for 1st person plural inclusive, an epenthetic -a- is inserted.

The postverbal portion is -ri for bases ending in -i, and -i for all others. However, in spoken Guarani, the -ri portion of the circumfix is frequently omitted for bases ending in -i.

Oral verb	Nasal verb	With ending in "i"
japo 'do, make'	kororõ 'roar, snore'	jupi 'go up, rise'
nd-ajapó-i	n-akororõ-i	nd-ajupí-ri
nde-rejapó-i	ne-rekororõ-i	nde-rejupí-ri
nd-ojapó-i	n-okororõ-i	nd-ojupí-ri
nda-jajapó-i	na-ñakororõ-i	nda-jajupí-ri
nd-orojapó-i	n-orokororõ-i	nd-orojupí-ri
nda-pejapó-i	na-pekororõ-i	nda-pejupí-ri
nd-ojapó-i	n-okororõ-i	nd-ojupí-ri

The negation can be used in all tenses, but for future or irrealis reference, the normal tense marking is replaced by mo'ã, resulting in n(d)(V)-base-mo'ã-i as in Ndajapomo'ãi, "I won't do it".

There are also other negatives, such as: ani, ỹhỹ, nahániri, naumbre, na'anga.

==== Active and stative verbs ====
Guarani is an active-stative language. In other words, Guarani consists of active transitive verbs as well as both active and stative intransitive verbs. To indicate the subject, active verbs use prefixes. In stative verbs, with the exception of the third person case, the subjects are not marked by prefixes, but by subject pronouns that operate independently and not as suffixes. It is also worth noting that in Guarani, first person plural can be inclusive or exclusive.

Pronouns
	Active		Stative
	areal	aireal	chendal
1sg.	a-	ai-	che
2sg.	re-	rei-	nde
3sg.	o-	oi-	i-
1pl. incl.	ja/ña-	jai-	ñande
1pl. excl.	ro-	roi-	ore
2pl.	pe-	pei-	pende
3pl.	o-	oi-	i-

Examples
Active	Stative
kirirĩ oi- pytyvõ akãngeta silence 3.ACT- help thinking "silence helps thinking"	che- mbyaju ko- t- a'arõ 1.SG.INACT- annoy DEM- NC- waiting 'this waiting is annoying me'
a- ha'arõ -ta asaje peve 1.SG.ACT- wait -INT noon until 'I will wait until noon'	ore- r- u i- kirirĩ o- pyta 1.PL.EXCL- REL- father 3.INACT- silence 3.ACT- remain 'our father kept silence/became silent'

=== Valency change ===
==== Valency increasing ====
In Guarani, valency increases occur by modifying the predicates in either valency 1 or valency 2 to the consecutive valency (i.e. valency 2 and 3 respectively for valency 1 and valency 2).

===== Causative voice =====
In Guarani, the causative voice is the only voice with the power to increase valency. For example, in the case of intransitive verbs, the causative voice can be observed by the prefix mbo/mo-.

Examples
a- mbo- jere ña'ẽmbe 1SG.ACT- CAUS- turn dish 'I turn the dish around'	a- mbo- guata kure 1SG.ACT- CAUS- walk pig 'I make the pig walk'

The prefixes of the causative voice have the flexibility of functioning as derivational morphemes.

Examples
mbo- katupyry CAUS- skilled 'to teach' or 'to train'	mo- aguĩ CAUS- close.by 'to bring closer'

In the case of transitive clauses, the causative morpheme uka is used.

Example 1

nd- a- h- echa -uka -i ndeve che- r- ãi
NEG- 1SG.ACT- POSS.3- see -TR.CAUS -NEG 2SG.DAT 1SG.INACT- POSS.1- tooth
'I didn't make you see my teeth' or 'I didn't smile at you'

Example 2

a- mo- potĩ -uka -se ndeve che- r- óga
1SG.ACT- CAUS- clean -TR.CAUS -DES 2SG.DAT 1SG.INACT- POSS.1- house
"I want to make you clean my house"

==== Valency-decreasing voices ====
In contrast to valency-increasing mechanisms, valency-decreasing mechanisms modify predicates so as to transform valency 2 and 3 to lower valencies. There are three valency-decreasing voices, they are: middle, reciprocal, and antipassive.

===== Middle =====
The prefix je/ñe- is used in the middle voice. The middle voice is utilized in contexts expressing passive and reflexive scenarios.

Examples
Passive	Reflexive
a- je- japi 1SG.ACT- MID- shoot 'I am (being) shot'	a- je- kutu 1SG.ACT- MID- nail 'I put a nail in myself'
a- ñe- nupã 1SG.ACT- MID- beat.up 'I am (being) beaten'	a- ñe- kytĩ 1SG.ACT- MID- cut 'I cut myself'

===== Reciprocal =====
The prefix jo/ño- indicates that a reciprocal voice is being used. In reciprocal voice, the participants of the clause are both the agent and the patient of one another.

Examples
ja- jo- hayhu 1PL.INCL.ACT- RECP- love 'you and I love each other'	ña- ño- nupã 1PL.INCL.ACT- RECP- beat.up 'you and I beat each other up'

===== Antipassive =====
The antipassive voice can be identified through the prefixes poro- and mba'e-. Poro- is used in association with human objects while mba'e- is used in contexts where inanimate as well as non-human subjects are present. In contrast to the passive middle voice, the antipassive voice detransivitizes the patient in the transitive clause as opposed to detransitivizing the agent.

Antipassive
Example 1

mbo'e -hára o- poro- mbo'e
teach -NMLZ.AG 3.ACT- ANTIP- teach
'the teacher teaches (people)'

Example 2

Juan o- poro- juka
Juan 3.ACT- ANTIP- kill
'Juan kills' or 'Juan is a killer'

Example 3

a- mba'e- jogua
1SG.ACT- ANTIP- buy
'I am shopping'

=== Distribution ===
Guarani temporal markers are only productive with indefinites, possessives, demonstratives, and qualification in nominal phrases. Depending on the clarification of the phrase they are in, they may or may not be applicable, as is represented in the chart below. Through analyzing this chart, one can see that -kue is not applicable to artifacts of a food or natural origin, and that -kue is also not applicable when combined with nouns that represent permanent relations.

Class	e.g.	-kue	-rã
Professions	priest	+	+
Non-food artifacts	chair	+	+
Food artifacts	milk	-	+
Natural kinds	forest	-	+
Temp. human relations	wife	!	!
Perm. human relations	daughter	-	!

! Only when the relationship is possessive.

=== Pronouns ===
There are six different types of pronouns in Guarani: (i) personal; (ii) demonstrative; (iii) indefinite; (iv) numeral; (v) negative, and (vi) interrogative.

==== Personal pronouns ====
First person plural pronouns in Guarani are distinguished by the clusivity of the subject being addressed; in other words, Guarani distinguishes between inclusive and exclusive pronouns of the first person plural.

		singular	plural
1st person	inclusive	che	ñande
1st person	exclusive	che	ore
2nd person		nde	peẽ
3rd person		ha'e	ha'ekuéra/hikuái (Note: hikuái is a post-verbal pronoun (ohecha hikuái 'they see'))

==== Reflexive inflection ====
The reflexive inflection within Guarani holds a specific morpheme, that being je- (e.g. ahecha 'I look', ajehecha 'I look at myself') . It stems together with the morpheme for a subject in a sentence, and is the indicator of whether the subject is the individual undergoing an action, or is the actor themselves.

Reflexive inflection
Example 1

che a- ĩ -a peve chivi o- vaẽ
1SG 1SG- be -NMLZ until puma 3.ACT- arrive
'the puma came as far as where I was staying'

Example 2

nde re- ke -a ja a- mba'eapo
2SG 2SG- sleep -NMLZ while 1SG- work
'while you were sleeping, I was working'

Example 3

i- py -nandi ha'e ij- ao soro
3.INACT- foot -uncovered 3SG 3.INACT- clothes broken
'he is barefoot and his clothes are ripped'

Example 4

ha'e ore- juhu
3SG 1.PL.EXCL.INACT- meet(ing)
'there was our meeting appointed to him/her' or 'he/she met us (but not you)'

==== Demonstrative pronouns ====
Demonstrative Pronouns
Attributives	Non-attributives	
ko	kóva	near the speaker
pe	péva	near the addressee
upé	upéva	away from both speaker and addressee

In Guarani, demonstrative pronouns reflect the proximal-distal dimension of the contexts in which the pronouns are used.

==== Indefinite pronouns ====
Indefinite Pronouns
amu'e	another
maimãramo	everybody
maimãva	any(one)
opa	every(body)
tóda	every(body)

Indefinite pronouns are pronouns that are neither people nor place specific.

==== Numeral pronouns ====
Numeral Pronouns
peteĩ	one
peteĩva	the one
irundy	four
mokõi	two

==== Negative pronouns ====
Negative Pronouns
Person	avave	nobody
Non-person	ma'eve, moive	nothing

Negative pronouns in Guarani can be both person and non-person specific.

==== Interrogative pronouns ====
Interrogative Pronouns
Person	ava	who
Non-person	ma'e	what (things)

Guarani interrogative pronouns have the same person and non-person distinction as negative pronouns.

=== Tense, aspect and mood ===
==== Tense and aspect ====
In grammar, tense can be defined as a grammatical tool that is used to refer to the time frame in connection to the moment of speaking, with the purpose being to express a specific difference in time in connection to a topic or the speaker. Nominal tense can be defined as an action that is true to an individual in a particular point in time, e.g. "Yesterday, a student knitted" in which the morphological marker for past tense in English, -ed, is attached to the action made by the student individual.

- -ramo: marks extreme proximity of the action, often translating to "just barely": Oguahẽramo, "He just barely arrived".
- -kuri: marks proximity of the action. Ha'ukuri, "I just ate" (ha'u irregular first person singular form of u, "to eat"). It can also be used after a pronoun, as in ha che kuri, che po'a, "and about what happened to me, I was lucky".
- -va'ekue: indicates a fact that occurred long ago and asserts that it's really true. Okañyva'ekue, "he/she went missing a long time ago".
- -ra'e: tells that the speaker was doubtful before but he's sure at the moment he speaks. Nde rejoguara'e peteĩ ta'angambyry pyahu, "so then you bought a new television after all".
- -raka'e: expresses the uncertainty of a perfect-aspect fact. Peẽ peikoraka'e Asunción-pe, "I think you lived in Asunción for a while". Nevertheless, nowadays this morpheme has lost some of its meaning, having a correspondence with ra'e and va'ekue.

The verb form without suffixes at all is a present somewhat aorist: Upe ára resẽ reho mombyry, "that day you got out and you went far".

- -ta: is a future of immediate happening, it's also used as authoritarian imperative. Oujeýta ag̃aite, "he/she'll come back soon".
- -ma: has the meaning of "already". Ajapóma, "I already did it".

These two suffixes can be added together: ahátama, "I'm already going".

- -va'erã: indicates something not imminent or something that must be done for social or moral reasons, in this case corresponding to the German modal verb sollen. Péa ojejapova'erã, "that must be done".
- -ne: indicates something that probably will happen or something the speaker imagines that is happening. It correlates in a certain way with the subjunctive of Spanish. Mitãnguéra ág̃a og̃uahéne hógape, "the children are probably coming home now".
- -hína, -ína after nasal words: continual action at the moment of speaking, present and pluperfect continuous or emphatic. Rojatapyhína, "we're making fire"; che ha'ehína, "it's ME!".
- -vo: it has a subtle difference with -hína in which -vo indicates not necessarily what's being done at the moment of speaking. amba'apóvo, "I'm working (not necessarily now)".
- -pota: indicates proximity immediately before the start of the process. Ajukapota, "I'm near the point at which I will start to kill" or "I'm just about to kill". (A particular sandhi rule is applied here: if the verbs ends in -po, the suffix changes to -mbota; ajapombota, "I'll do it right now").
- -pa: indicates emphatically that a process has all finished. Amboparapa pe ogyke, "I painted the wall completely".

This suffix can be joined with -ma, making up -páma: ñande jaikuaapáma nde remimo'ã, "now we came to know all your thought".

- -mi: customary action in the past: Oumi, "He used to come a lot".

These are unstressed suffixes: -ta, -ma, -ne, -vo, -mi; so the stress goes upon the last syllable of the verb or the last stressed syllable.

To connect to tense that is past oriented, the morpheme suffix –kue is used. Translated roughly into English, -kue signifies the 'ex' of something, as can be seen in the example below, or as something that exists only in the former. In order to connect to future events, the morpheme suffix –rã is used. In English, – rã translates to meaning 'future', and it signifies the 'future' of something, as can be seen in the example below, or as something that only exists within the future.

===== Nouns =====
Guarani exhibits nominal tense: past, expressed with -kue, and future, expressed with -rã. For example, tetã ruvichakue translates to "ex-president" while tetã ruvicharã translates to "president-elect." The past morpheme -kue is often translated as "ex-", "former", "abandoned", "what was once", or "one-time". These morphemes can even be combined to express the idea of something that was going to be but did not end up happening. So for example, pa'irãgue is "a person who studied to be a priest but didn't actually finish", or rather, "the ex-future priest". Some nouns use -re instead of -kue and others use -guã instead of -rã.

==== Mood ====
- -se: desiderative suffix: (Che) añemoaranduse, "I want to study".
- te-: desiderative prefix: Ahasa, "I pass", Tahasa, "I would like to pass." te- is the underlying form. It is similar to the negative in that it has the same vowel alternations and deletions, depending on the person marker on the verb.

===== Desiderative inflection =====
The morpheme for desiderative inflection, 'ta-'. As in the other examples mentioned prior, this morpheme stems together with the subject in a sentence for indicating someone's wish, permission, command, etc.

=== Inflection ===
Inflection or inflectional affixes, are the changes in a word to mark differentiations in tense, person, mood, voice, case, and number of speakers. Inflectional affixes can be in turn divided into seven different components.

==== Reference-based inflection ====
Firstly, there are inflections of personal reference, which can connect to the speaker, addressee, or neither.

Secondly, there is subject reference, which is the inflection that relates to the subject of a conversation, which follow the same structures as personal reference.

Third, there is object reference, which is the inflection used when connecting a person to an object.

==== Reciprocal inflection ====
Reciprocal inflection holds the specific morpheme 'yo-', which similar to the morpheme for reflexive inflection combines with the subject of a sentence, specifically in third person or plural morphemes.

==== Commanding inflection ====
The commanding inflection represents itself in Guarani with the morpheme 'e-', which occurs with verbal stems for the purpose of indicating second person singular command.

== Vocabulary ==
=== Spanish loans in Guarani ===
The close and prolonged contact Spanish and Guarani have experienced has resulted in many Guarani words of Spanish origin. Many of these loans were for things or concepts unknown to the New World prior to Spanish colonization. Examples are seen below:

Semantic category	Spanish		Guarani		English
Semantic category	Orthography	IPA	Orthography	IPA	English
animals	vaca	/baka/	vaka	/ʋaˈka/	cow
animals	caballo	/kabaʝo/	kavaju	/kaʋaˈᵈju/	horse
animals	cabra	/kabɾa/	kavara	/kaʋaˈɾa/	goat
religion	cruz	/kɾuθ/	kurusu	/kuɾuˈsu/	cross
religion	Jesucristo	/xesukɾisto/	Hesukrísto	/xesuˈkɾisto/	Jesus Christ
religion	Pablo	/pablo/	Pavlo	/paˈʋlo/	Paul (saint)
place names	Australia	/austɾalia/	Autaralia	/autaɾaliˈa/	Australia
place names	Islandia	/islandia/	Iylanda	/iɨlaˈⁿda/	Iceland
place names	Portugal	/poɾtugal/	Poytuga	/poɨtuˈɰa/	Portugal
foods	queso	/keso/	kesu	/keˈsu/	cheese
foods	azúcar	/aθukaɾ/	asuka	/asuˈka/	sugar
foods	morcilla	/moɾθiʝa/	mbusia	/ᵐbusiˈa/	blood sausage
herbs/spices	canela	/kanela/	kanéla	/kaˈnela/	cinnamon
herbs/spices	culantro	/kulantɾo/	kuratũ	/kũɾ̃ãˈtũ/	cilantro (US), coriander (UK)
herbs/spices	anís	/aˈnis/	ani	/aˈni/	anise

== Sample text ==
Article 1 of the Universal Declaration of Human Rights in Guarani:

Mayma yvypóra ou ko yvy ári iñapyty'yre ha eteĩcha tekoruvicharenda ha akatúape jeguerekópe; ha ikatu rupi oikuaa añetéva ha añete'yva, iporãva ha ivaíva, tekotevẽ pehenguéicha oiko oñondivekuéra.
[maɨˈma ʔɨʋɨˈpoɾa ʔoˈu ko ʔɨˈʋɨ ˈʔaɾi ʔiɲapɨtɨʔɨˈɾe xa ʔẽtẽˈĩɕã tekoɾuʋiɕaɾeˈⁿda xa ʔakaˈtuape ᵈjeweɾeˈkope; xa ʔikaˈtu ɾuˈpi ʔoikuaˈa ʔaɲeˈteʋa xa ʔaɲeteʔɨˈʋa, ʔĩpõˈɾ̃ãʋã xa ʔiʋaˈiʋa tẽkõtẽˈʋẽ pexeˈᵑgʷeiɕa ʔoiˈko ʔoɲoⁿdiʋeˈkʷeɾa]

Article 1 of the Universal Declaration of Human Rights in English:

All human beings are born free and equal in dignity and rights. They are endowed with reason and conscience and should act towards one another in a spirit of brotherhood.

== Literature ==
A more modern translation of the whole Bible into Guarani is known as Ñandejara Ñe'ẽ.

In 2019, Jehovah's Witnesses released the New World Translation of the Holy Scriptures in Guarani, both in print and online.

Novels in Guarani have been published:

- Kalaito Pombero (Tadeo Zarratea, 1981)
- Pore'ỹ rape (Hugo Centurión, 2016)
- Tatukua (Arnaldo Casco Villalba, 2017)

=== Guarani-language authors ===
- Néstor Amarilla
- Julio Correa
- Susy Delgado
- Rigoberto Fontao Meza
- David Galeano Olivera
- Herme Medina Agüero
- Silvano Mosqueira
- Clementino Ocampos
- Manuel Ortiz Guerrero

== Institutions ==
- Guarani Language and Culture Athenaeum
- Yvy Marãe'ỹ Foundation

== See also ==
- Guarani languages
- Nheengatu language
- Jopará
- Jesuit Reductions
- Mbyá Guaraní language
- Old Tupi
- Guarani Wikipedia
- WikiProject Guaraní (in Spanish)

== Bibliography ==
- Andréasson, Daniel (2001). Active languages (PDF) (BA thesis). Stockholm University. pp. 18–20. Archived from the original (PDF) on 2 March 2008.
- Barrera, Meritxell Fernández (2015). Paraguayan Guarani: Some considerations about language mixing and an acoustic study of urban and rural vowels (Thesis). Leiden University.
- Cerno, Leonardo (2011). Descripción fonológica y morfosintáctica de una variedad de la lengua guaraní hablada en la provincia de Corrientes (Argentina) [Phonological and morphosyntactic description of a variety of the Guarani language spoken in the province of Corrientes (Argentina)] (in Spanish). Rosario: Universidad Nacional de Rosario. Archived from the original on 21 December 2025.
- Drude, Sebastian (2008). "Inflectional Units and their Effects". In Sackmann, Robin (ed.). Explorations in Integrational Linguistics. Amsterdam Studies in the Theory and History of Linguistic Science. Vol. 285. John Benjamins Publishing Company. ISBN 978 90 272 4800 8. ISSN 0304-0763.
- Estigarribia, Bruno; Pinta, Justin (2017). Guarani Linguistics in the 21st Century. Brill's Studies in the Indigenous Languages of the Americas. Vol. 14. Brill. ISBN 978-90-04-32257-8.
- Estigarribia, Bruno (2020). A Grammar of Paraguayan Guarani. Grammars of World and Minority Languages. London: UCL Press. doi:10.14324/111.9781787352872. ISBN 978-1-78735-287-2.
- Gregores, Emma; Suarez, Jorge (1967). A Description of Colloquial Guarani. Hague, Paris: Mouton & Co. pp. 140–141.
- Gutman, Alejandro; Avanzati, Beatriz (2013). "Guarani". Languages Gulper.
- Nordhoff, Sebastian (2004). Sasse, Hans-Jürgen (ed.). "Nomen-Verb-Distinktion im Guarani" (PDF). Arbeitspapier (in German). 48. Köln: Universität zu Köln. ISSN 1615-1496. Archived from the original (PDF) on 12 June 2020.
- Tonhauser, Judith (2007). "Nominal Tense? The Meaning of Guaraní Nominal Temporal Markers". Language. 83 (4): 831–869. doi:10.1353/lan.2008.0037. S2CID 50797962.
- Tonhauser, Judith; Colijn, Erika (2010). "Word Order in Paraguayan Guarani". International Journal of American Linguistics. 76 (2): 255–288. doi:10.1086/652267. S2CID 73554080.
- Verón, Miguel Ángel (2020). "La lengua guaraní en la era digital: perspectivas y desafíos" [The Guaraní language in the Digital Era: Perspectives and Challenges]. Arandu UTIC (in Spanish). VII (1). ISSN 2311-7559.
- Walker, Rachel (1999). "Guaraní Voiceless Stops in Oral versus Nasal Contexts: An Acoustical Study". Journal of the International Phonetic Association. 29 (1). University of Southern California: 63–94. JSTOR 44526233.

Indigenous languages of the Americas with Wikipedia
Item	Label/en	native label	Code	distribution map	number of speakers, writers, or signers	UNESCO language status	Ethnologue language status	?itemwiki
Q36806	Southern Quechua	qu:Urin Qichwa qu:Qhichwa qu:Qichwa	qu		6000000	2 vulnerable		Quechua Wikipedia
Q35876	Guarani	gn:Avañe'ẽ	gn		4850000	1 safe	1 National	Guarani Wikipedia
Q4627	Aymara	ay:Aymar aru	ay		4000000	2 vulnerable		Aymara Wikipedia
Q13300	Nahuatl	nah:Nawatlahtolli nah:nawatl nah:mexkatl	nah		1925620	2 vulnerable		Nahuatl Wikipedia
Q891085	Wayuu	guc:Wayuunaiki	guc		300000	2 vulnerable	5 Developing	Wayuu Wikipedia
Q33730	Mapudungun	arn:Mapudungun	arn		300000	3 definitely endangered	6b Threatened	Mapuche Wikipedia
Q13310	Navajo	nv:Diné bizaad nv:Diné	nv		169369	2 vulnerable	6b Threatened	Navajo Wikipedia
Q25355	Greenlandic	kl:Kalaallisut	kl		56200	2 vulnerable	1 National	Greenlandic Wikipedia
Q29921	Inuktitut	ike-cans:ᐃᓄᒃᑎᑐᑦ iu:Inuktitut	iu		39770	2 vulnerable		Inuktitut Wikipedia
Q33388	Cherokee	chr:ᏣᎳᎩ ᎧᏬᏂᎯᏍᏗ chr:ᏣᎳᎩ	chr		12300	4 severely endangered	8a Moribund	Cherokee Wikipedia
Q33390	Cree	cr:ᐃᔨᔨᐤ ᐊᔨᒧᐎᓐ' cr:nēhiyawēwin	cr		10875; 8040			Cree Wikipedia
Q32979	Choctaw	cho:Chahta anumpa cho:Chahta	cho		9200	2 vulnerable	6b Threatened	Choctaw Wikipedia
Q56590	Atikamekw	atj:Atikamekw Nehiromowin atj:Atikamekw	atj		6160	2 vulnerable	5 Developing	Atikamekw Wikipedia
Q27183	Iñupiaq	ik:Iñupiatun	ik		5580	4 severely endangered		Inupiat Wikipedia
Q523014	Muscogee	mus:Mvskoke	mus		4300	3 definitely endangered	7 Shifting	Muscogee Wikipedia
Q33265	Cheyenne	chy:Tsêhesenêstsestôtse	chy		2400	3 definitely endangered	8a Moribund	Cheyenne Wikipedia
