= Rigoberto Fontao Meza =

Paraguayan poet (1900–1936)

- Born: Rigoberto Fontao Meza; December 29, 1900; Tape Ka'aty, San Pedro Department, Paraguay
- Died: December 29, 1936 (aged 36); Asunción, Paraguay
- Known for: Poet
- Notable work: "El arriero" "India" "Che Resay"

Rigoberto Fontao Meza (December 29, 1900 – December 29, 1936) was a Paraguayan poet who wrote in Spanish, Guarani and Jopara.

He died in Asunción, Paraguay, on his 36th birthday, December 29, 1936.
