= Wayuu language =

Major Arawakan language spoken in the Guajira Peninsula

Wayuu
- Guajiro
- Wayuunaiki
- Pronunciation: [waˈjuːnaiki]
- Native to: Venezuela, Colombia
- Region: Guajira Peninsula, Lake Maracaibo
- Ethnicity: 790,000 Wayuu people (2011 & 2019 censuses)
- Native speakers: 420,000 (2008–2012)
- Language family: Arawakan: Northern; Ta-Arawakan; Wayuu
- Writing system: Latin script

Official status
- Regulated by: Centro Etnoeducativo Kamusuchiwoꞌu

Language codes
- ISO 639-3: guc
- Glottolog: wayu1243
- ELP: Guajiro
- Extent of the Wayuu people and language

- People: Wayuu
- Language: Wayuunaiki
- Country: Wajiira

Wayuu (Wayuu: Wayuunaiki [waˈjuːnaiki]), or Guajiro, is the most widely-spoken Arawakan language, spoken by 400,000 Indigenous Wayuu people in northwestern Venezuela and northeastern Colombia on the Guajira Peninsula and surrounding Lake Maracaibo.

There were an estimated 300,000 speakers of Wayuunaiki in Venezuela in 2012 and another 120,000 in Colombia in 2008, approximately half the ethnic population of 400,000 in Venezuela (2011 census) and 400,000 in Colombia (2018 census). Smith (1995) reports that a mixed Wayuu—Spanish language is replacing Wayuunaiki in both countries. However, Campbell (1997) could find no information on this.

== Recent developments ==
To promote bilingual education among Wayuu and other Colombians, the Kamusuchiwoꞌu Ethno-educative Center (Spanish: Centro Etnoeducativo Kamusuchiwoꞌu) came up with the initiative of creating the first illustrated Wayuunaiki–Spanish, Spanish–Wayuunaiki dictionary.

In December 2011, the Wayuu Taya Foundation and Microsoft presented the first ever dictionary of technology terms in Wayuunaiki, after having developed it for three years with a team of technology professionals and linguists.

== Dialects ==
The two main dialects are Wüinpümüin and Wopumüin, spoken in the northeast and southwest of the peninsula, respectively. These dialects are mutually intelligible, as they are minimally distinct. The extinct Guanebucan language may actually have been a dialect of Wayuunaiki. The main difference between Wüinpümüin and Wopümüin is that Wüinpümüin uses jia as the 3rd person feminine pronoun, and jaya for the second person plural, while Wopümüin uses shia as the 3rd person feminine, and jia as the second person plural. There are minor vocabulary differences, but the main one is related to only the pronouns, and their respective prefixes.

== Phonology ==
The vowels of Wayuu are as follows:

Vowels
	Front	Central	Back
Close	i ⟨i⟩	ɨ ⟨ü⟩	u ⟨u⟩
Mid	ɛ ⟨e⟩		ɔ ⟨o⟩
Open		a ⟨a⟩	

Note: ⟨e⟩ and ⟨o⟩ are more open than in English. ⟨a⟩ is slightly front of central, and ⟨ü⟩ is slightly back of central. All vowels can either occur in short or long versions.

Consonants
	Labial	Alveolar	Palatal	Velar	Glottal
Nasal	m ⟨m⟩	n ⟨n⟩			
Plosive	p ⟨p⟩	t̪ ⟨t⟩	t͡ʃ ⟨ch⟩	k ⟨k⟩	ʔ ⟨ꞌ⟩
Fricative		s ⟨s⟩	ʃ ⟨sh⟩		h ⟨j⟩
Flap		ɺ ⟨l⟩			
Trill		r ⟨r⟩			
Semivowel	w ⟨w⟩		j ⟨y⟩		

⟨l⟩ is a lateral flap pronounced with the tongue just behind the position for the Spanish ⟨r⟩, and with a more lateral airflow.

The length of plosive consonants (p, t, k) and nasal consonants (m, n) can be long, in which case they are written double (pp, tt, kk, mm, nn). The accent in Wayuu generally falls on the second syllable of the word, except when it begins with a long vowel (VV) or a consonant followed by a long vowel (CVV) or with a closed syllable (CVC), in which case the accent falls on the first syllable. In words with an irregular accent that do not comply with these rules, the accent is marked when writing with an accent. Nasalization occurs phonetically in Wayu, but does not have a phonemic character. It occurs in vowels next to nasal consonants or as an emphasizing feature of certain words such as aa "yes", maꞌi "very" or eejuu "smell".

== Grammar ==
Nouns are expressed with a suffix that indicates the plural number (-kana) or the singular depending on whether it is masculine (-kai) or non-masculine (-kat). The classification plural, masculine singular, feminine singular affects the entire language and in particular the pronouns and conjugations of verbs. All nouns that do not have a determined gender are assumed to be non-masculine. Demonstrative pronouns, for example, have a root that indicates whether it is masculine singular (chi-), not masculine singular (tü-) or plural (na-), which is used in the basic form to indicate the closest presence (this, this, these) and to which a suffix is added to indicate degrees of greater distance (-ra/ --la, -sa, -a/-ia/-ya), like this:

	Masculine	Non-masculine	Plural
Adjacent to speaker	chi this (masc.)	tü this (non-masculine)	na these
Adjacent to hearer	chira that (masc.)	türa that (non-masc.)	nala those
Not adjacent	chisa that over there (masc.)	tüsa that over there (non-masc.)	nasa those over there
Far	chia that far away (masc.)	tia that far away (non-masc.)	naya those far away

The personal pronouns in Wayuunaiki are

Wayuunaiki personal pronouns
	singular	plural
1st person	taya	waya
2nd person	pia	jia/jaya
3rd person	nia (he) shia/jia (she)	naya

Wayuunaiki uses personal prefixes derived from the pronouns, along with 3 extra non-pronoun derived prefixes (ka- - possessive, ma- - negative, pa- - dual (not commonly used)). There also exists a 10th personal prefix for the unspecified/indefinite, labeled as the “zero person”, a-. The vowels in the personal prefixes change depending on the first vowel and consonants of the verb, noun, or preposition it is placed on, dubbed vocalic mutation. The prefixes that correspond with the -aya ending pronouns typically follow the beginning vowel of the mentioned word classes, while the ones that correspond with the -ia ending pronouns almost always go through vocalic mutation. There are rules to what vowel is used when, but typically, -aya pronoun derived and the 4 non-pronoun derived prefixes use a, e, or o, while the remaining 3 -ia pronoun derived use ü, i, and u respectively to the previous. These prefixes are used when expressing a verb with the objective construction, or, for the pronoun-derived prefixes, when expressing someone's ownership of something.

There are 9 triads of suffixes for the singular masculine animate, singular feminine animate/general inanimate, and the general plural. These suffixes can manifest in tense, aspect, and mood suffixes for verbs, derivational words, the definite article suffixes, or in the case of triad G, the negative ma- verb prefix's suffixes.

The most common triad of suffixes in verbs is triad A (shi/sü/shii), the general time suffixes, also named as “present-past time”, where it combines the English and Spanish equivalents of the basic present and the basic past tense. Whichever equivalent is being implied depends on the context of the situation, and sometimes can be interpreted or translated as a completely different tense, the present-continuous (named “future imminent” in the studies done over Wayuunaiki), which has its own suffix triad, using triad B and combining it with -i- (-ichi, -irü, -ina).

== Morphology ==
Wayuunaiki is agglutinative, with the majority of ways of expressing aspect and mood being used with suffixes, attached to the end of a verb. There are alienable and inalienable nouns, where the former requires possessive suffixes to express possession, while the latter is seen as inherently possessed by something, does not require possessive suffixes, and is usually accompanied by the pronoun derived prefixes. Words can be combined together to form new ones, with the typical 2 patterns being alienable + inalienable or inalienable + inalienable, where the 0 person (a-, e-, o-) prefix of the latter is removed and fully mixed with the former, with necessary vocalic and consonantal mutations. Another form of this is combining any noun or preposition with a verb, the verb going first, to for a new word that could either be a noun or verb. The latter form of this requires a suffix from triad F (chi, lü ~ rü, chii) to be added at the end of the new word.

The verb infinitive is formed by taking the root of the verb, adding an indefinite prefix following those rules if it is an active verb, and lengthening the final vowel. If the final vowel is already doubled in the root (-aa, -ee, -ii, -oo, -uu, -üü), then it gets cut in half, and -waa is added to the end. Sets of infinitives with a common root, but with different aspects and moods may be formed by adding an affix between the root and infinitive ending, such as the causative -ira, the passive -na and -uu, the imperfective -iraa, and the desiderative -ee. For example, from the root kache ("hang"), one can derive the desiderative a-kache-r-ee-waa "to want to hang". There is debate about whether said derived words should be considered verbs in their own right, or as inflections of the root verb. In most simple verbs, the root is also followed by a 'thematic suffix'.

Verbs are conjugated for gender, tense, and number. There are ten tenses: the present-past, the near future, the general future, the future intentive, the past perfect, the near past, the current past, the former past, the remote past, and the frequentative past. There are also nine 'triads', general time categories, lettered A through J, which changed the gender inflection of the verb. Present-past and remote past use triads A. Immediate future, general future, and imminent future use triads B. Future intentive uses triads C. Near past, current past, and former past use triads E, and all other tenses use triads J. Triad conjugations are as follows. Note that while there is no specific feminine plural, the plural suffix -irua may be added to indicate the feminine.

Gender-number suffixes
triads	A	B	C	D	E	F	G	H	I	J
Masc.	-shi	-chi	-chi	-(l)i	-(l)i	-chi	-(l)i	-sa(l)i	-in	Ø
Fem.	-sü	-rü	-tü	-rü	-lü	-rü	-lü	-salü	-in	Ø
Plural	-shii	-na	-na	-na	-lii	-chii	-na	-salii	-in	Ø

A phonological shift occurs in the conjugation of active verbs whose infinitives end in laa, raa, loo and roo. By shortening the vowels, their thematic suffixes remain la, ra, lo and ro, but when they undergo vowel harmony they change to lü, rü, lu and ru. By adding the suffixes –shi, -sü, -shii, ü and u disappear, and l and r become t.

== Syntax ==
In general, the verb precedes the subject and the latter precedes the object or predicate (VSO type). However, word order is not restricted and there can be sentences in other word orders. Two predication schemes are presented: a bifurcated predicate-subject one and a synthetic one, predicate-centered or compact, in which the sentence is composed of only one phrase with a verbal nucleus. Conjugation is done through personal prefixes, infixes and suffixes of mode, time and aspect and number-gender of the object. Negation is indicated with the prefix m-, although there is also the negative verb nnojolaa ("not to be", "not to be", "not to have"), and also "not to have" or "not to have" can be expressed with the prefix ma- followed by the respective noun.

== Numerals ==
The numerals from 1 to 10 are as follows. Numerals precede the noun.

Numerals in Wayuu and English
Wayuu	English	Wayuu	English
wanee	one	aipirua	six
piama	two	akaraishi	seven
apünüin	three	mekiisat	eight
pienchi	four	mekieꞌetsat	nine
jarai	five	poꞌloo	ten

== Vocabulary examples ==
The following are examples of Wayuunaiki.

- (Anasü) wattaꞌa maat/lü 'Good morning'
- (Anasü) Aliika 'Good afternoon'
- (Anasü) Aipaꞌa 'Good night'
- Jamaya pia? 'How are you (singular)?'
- Jamaya jia/jaya? 'How are you (plural)?'
- Atpanaa 'Rabbit'
- Alama 'Grass'
- Amüchi 'Clay jar'
- Anayaawatsü saaꞌu 'Thank you'
- Pümayaa 'Hurry up'
- Kasaichi pünülia? 'What is your name?'
- Aishi maꞌi pia tapüla 'I love you so much (to a man)'
- Aisü maꞌi pia tapüla 'I love you so much (to a woman)'

Wayuunaiki itself comes from wayuu 'human being/people' and the suffix -naiki, from anüiki 'speech' ('word' or 'language'), literally meaning '[the] people's speech'.

== Notes ==
Indigenous languages of the Americas with Wikipedia
Item	Label/en	native label	Code	distribution map	number of speakers, writers, or signers	UNESCO language status	Ethnologue language status	?itemwiki
Q36806	Southern Quechua	qu:Urin Qichwa qu:Qhichwa qu:Qichwa	qu		6000000	2 vulnerable		Quechua Wikipedia
Q35876	Guarani	gn:Avañe'ẽ	gn		4850000	1 safe	1 National	Guarani Wikipedia
Q4627	Aymara	ay:Aymar aru	ay		4000000	2 vulnerable		Aymara Wikipedia
Q13300	Nahuatl	nah:Nawatlahtolli nah:nawatl nah:mexkatl	nah		1925620	2 vulnerable		Nahuatl Wikipedia
Q891085	Wayuu	guc:Wayuunaiki	guc		300000	2 vulnerable	5 Developing	Wayuu Wikipedia
Q33730	Mapudungun	arn:Mapudungun	arn		300000	3 definitely endangered	6b Threatened	Mapuche Wikipedia
Q13310	Navajo	nv:Diné bizaad nv:Diné	nv		169369	2 vulnerable	6b Threatened	Navajo Wikipedia
Q25355	Greenlandic	kl:Kalaallisut	kl		56200	2 vulnerable	1 National	Greenlandic Wikipedia
Q29921	Inuktitut	ike-cans:ᐃᓄᒃᑎᑐᑦ iu:Inuktitut	iu		39770	2 vulnerable		Inuktitut Wikipedia
Q33388	Cherokee	chr:ᏣᎳᎩ ᎧᏬᏂᎯᏍᏗ chr:ᏣᎳᎩ	chr		12300	4 severely endangered	8a Moribund	Cherokee Wikipedia
Q33390	Cree	cr:ᐃᔨᔨᐤ ᐊᔨᒧᐎᓐ' cr:nēhiyawēwin	cr		10875; 8040			Cree Wikipedia
Q32979	Choctaw	cho:Chahta anumpa cho:Chahta	cho		9200	2 vulnerable	6b Threatened	Choctaw Wikipedia
Q56590	Atikamekw	atj:Atikamekw Nehiromowin atj:Atikamekw	atj		6160	2 vulnerable	5 Developing	Atikamekw Wikipedia
Q27183	Iñupiaq	ik:Iñupiatun	ik		5580	4 severely endangered		Inupiat Wikipedia
Q523014	Muscogee	mus:Mvskoke	mus		4300	3 definitely endangered	7 Shifting	Muscogee Wikipedia
Q33265	Cheyenne	chy:Tsêhesenêstsestôtse	chy		2400	3 definitely endangered	8a Moribund	Cheyenne Wikipedia
