= Guarani Braille =

Braille alphabet of Guaraní

- Script type: alphabet
- Print basis: Guarani alphabet
- Languages: Guarani

Related scripts
- Parent systems: Braille: Guarani Braille

Guarani Braille is the braille alphabet of the Paraguayan Guarani language. Letter assignments are those of Spanish Braille (except for the accented vowels): that is, the basic braille alphabet plus ⠻ for ñ. An additional letter, ⠒, is used for glottal stop, written as an apostrophe in the Guarani print alphabet. Print digraphs such as ch and rr are digraphs in braille as well. In addition, the tilde in print is written as the letter ⠱ in braille, and comes before the letter it appears on in print. Thus the Guarani letters outside the basic Latin alphabet are:

⠒	⠻	⠱⠁	⠱⠑	⠱⠛	⠱⠊	⠱⠕	⠱⠥	⠱⠽
’	ñ	ã	ẽ	g̃	ĩ	õ	ũ	ỹ
