= Guarani Language and Culture Athenaeum =

The Guarani Language and Culture Athenaeum (Guarani: Guarani Ñe’ẽte ha Arandu Anamandaje; Spanish: Ateneo de Lengua y Cultura Guarani) is an autonomous Paraguayan philanthropic institution founded by David Galeano Olivera on September 23, 1985, whose main objective is the recovery, valuation, and dissemination of the Guarani language, folklore, and culture. Headquartered in Fernando de la Mora, it brings together students, professors, graduates, teachers, doctors, personalities, and institutions such as cultural centers, institutions, and universities.

== Activities ==
Since its beginnings, the institution has sought to create citizen awareness in favor of the Guarani people through research and learning methodology. This methodology seeks to create scientific educational processes to achieve the understanding, updating, and improvement of the Guarani language, and the systematization of its cultural heritage through the contributions of its members and collaborators.

As an institution, it achieved the inclusion of the bachelor's degree in Guarani Language in higher institutes and collaborated in the creation of the teaching methodology for basic and middle level institutions in Paraguay. This bore fruit until achieving a bilingual teaching of the areas of study in schools, a vital aspect mainly for schools and colleges outside the areas of Asunción and border capitals where Guarani is the predominant language. Likewise, it was decentralized for the promotion and systematized diffusion of the language, achieving the creation of branch centers in all the departmental capitals and important cities of Paraguay. As well as in many cities of Argentina and Brazil (due to the cultural influence), the United States, Spain and Italy, places with Guarani cultural influence due to the emigration of Paraguayans.

The Ministry of Education and Science of Paraguay, with Resolutions 369/1995 and 37/1999, recognized the work of the institution, taking advantage of its publications and those of its members for national education. Likewise, the Chamber of Senators recognized the “Instituto de Formación Docente del Ateneo de Lengua y Cultura Guaraní” as a formal institution of higher level with the decree law 2574/2005. Likewise, different institutions have declared its work to be of national interest. Thanks to the work of the members, the National Secretariat of Linguistic Policies of Paraguay issued Resolution 80/2012 creating the Academy of the Guarani Language.
