= Portuguese Braille =

Braille alphabet of the Portuguese language

- Script type: alphabet
- Print basis: Portuguese alphabet
- Languages: Portuguese

Related scripts
- Parent systems: Braille: French Braille; Portuguese Braille
- Sister systems: Spanish Braille

Portuguese Braille is the braille alphabet of the Portuguese language, both in Portugal and in Brazil. It is very close to French Braille, with slight modification of the accented letters and some differences in punctuation.

== Alphabet ==
The French Braille letters for vowels with a grave accent in print tend to be used for vowels with an acute accents in Portuguese Braille. (See French Braille#Similar alphabets. The French vowels ⠪ œ and ⠜ ä are used for the Portuguese nasal vowels õ and ã. In numerical order, the letters are:

a	b	c	d	e	f	g	h	i	j
k	l	m	n	o	p	q	r	s	t
u	v	x	y	z	ç	é	á	è	ú
â	ê	ì	ô	ù	à	ï	ü	õ	w, ò
í	ó	ã							

== Punctuation ==
Punctuation is nearly identical to that of Spanish Braille.

Single punctuation:

⠂ (braille pattern dots-2)	⠄ (braille pattern dots-3)	⠄ (braille pattern dots-3)	⠢ (braille pattern dots-26)	⠖ (braille pattern dots-235)	⠆ (braille pattern dots-23)	⠒ (braille pattern dots-25)	⠤ (braille pattern dots-36)	⠐ (braille pattern dots-5) ⠒ (braille pattern dots-25)	⠤ (braille pattern dots-36)	⠔ (braille pattern dots-35)	⠠ (braille pattern dots-6) ⠂ (braille pattern dots-2)	⠸ (braille pattern dots-456)
,	.	'	?	!	;	:	-	–	—	*	/	|

The en dash is written on the middle dots, while the em dash is written on the bottom dots.

⠪ (braille pattern dots-246) ⠕ (braille pattern dots-135)	⠯ (braille pattern dots-12346)	⠒ (braille pattern dots-25) ⠕ (braille pattern dots-135)	⠪ (braille pattern dots-246) ⠒ (braille pattern dots-25)	⠪ (braille pattern dots-246) ⠒ (braille pattern dots-25) ⠕ (braille pattern dots-135)
•	&	→	←	↔

Paired punctuation:

...	...	...
“ ... ” (outer quotes)	« ... » (inner quotes)	‘ ... ’ etc. (innermost quotes)

...	...	...	...
( ... )	( ... )	[ ... ]	[ ... ]

The two sets of parentheses and square brackets are alternatives. Many sources give only one, usually the second.

== Numbers ==
Digits are the international norm of the first ten letters of the alphabet marked by ⠼.

The number sign takes the place of spaces within a number such as a serial number. For example, A (46 1) is transcribed ⠨⠁⠀⠣⠼⠙⠋⠼⠁⠜.

Additional symbols:

⠰ (braille pattern dots-56)	⠈ (braille pattern dots-4) ⠑ (braille pattern dots-15)	⠸ (braille pattern dots-456) ⠴ (braille pattern dots-356)	⠸ (braille pattern dots-456) ⠴ (braille pattern dots-356)	⠎ (braille pattern dots-234)	⠴ (braille pattern dots-356)	⠳ (braille pattern dots-1256)	⠳ (braille pattern dots-1256)
$	€	%	‰	§	°	′	"

The real sign is typically used like a decimal point: 4$50.

For arithmetic:

⠖ (braille pattern dots-235)	⠤ (braille pattern dots-36)	⠦ (braille pattern dots-236)	⠲ (braille pattern dots-256)	⠶ (braille pattern dots-2356)	⠐ (braille pattern dots-5) ⠲ (braille pattern dots-256)	⠕ (braille pattern dots-135)	⠪ (braille pattern dots-246)
+	−	×	:	=	/ (fraction)	>	<

The fraction bar ⠐⠲ is equivalent to either a virgule or horizontal bar in print. For exponents, use the superscript sign ⠡ below.

== Formatting ==
⠼ (braille pattern dots-3456)	⠨ (braille pattern dots-46)	⠨ (braille pattern dots-46)	⠔ (braille pattern dots-35) ⠀ (braille pattern blank)	⠡ (braille pattern dots-16)	⠌ (braille pattern dots-34)	⠐ (braille pattern dots-5)	⠰ (braille pattern dots-56)	⠿ (braille pattern dots-123456)
(digit)	(Caps)	(ALL CAPS)	(emphasis)	(super- script)	(sub- script)	(l.c.)	(orig.)	(col.)

⠨⠨ is used to indicate that an entire word is in upper case. For a series of words in upper case, a colon is added: ⠒⠨⠨.

Emphasis corresponds to bold or italic in print. As with brackets, a second sign indicates the end of the emphasized text.

The lower-case sign ⠐ is also used to mark that a line break occurs in the middle of a mathematical expression.

⠰ restores the original reading of a character.

⠿ is optionally used as a column marker when transcribing tables, especially those with empty cells, to clarify the alignment of the data. For example, the first line of the table at the top of this section would be, in a braille text,

⠿⠼⠀⠀⠿⠨⠀⠀⠿⠨⠨⠀⠿⠔⠀⠔⠿⠡⠀⠀⠿⠌⠀⠀⠿⠐⠀⠀⠿⠰⠀⠀⠿⠿⠀⠀
