= Tatukua =

2017 novel by Arnaldo Casco Villalba

- First edition
- Author: Arnaldo Casco
- Language: Guarani
- Published: 2017
- Publication place: Paraguay
- ISBN: 9789996752032
- OCLC: 1038279780

Tatukua is a 2017 novel by Paraguayan writer Arnaldo Casco Villalba. It is written in the Guarani language and seeks to recover old countryside traditions. This novel is considered part of a national movement for the revival of the language.
