= Pore'ỹ rape =

2016 novel by Hugo Centurión

- Author: Hugo Centurión
- Language: Guarani
- Published: 2016
- Publisher: Servilibro
- Publication place: Paraguay
- ISBN: 9789996702792

Pore'ỹ rape is a 2016 novel by Paraguayan writer Hugo Centurión. Written in Guarani, it is part of a national revival of the language.
