= Spanish Braille =

Braille alphabet of Spanish and Galician

Spanish Braille ⠨⠃⠗⠁⠊⠇⠇⠑ ⠑⠎⠏⠁⠻⠕⠇
- Script type: Alphabet
- Print basis: Spanish alphabet
- Languages: Spanish, Galician

Related scripts
- Parent systems: Braille: French Braille; Spanish Braille
- Child systems: Guarani Braille
- Sister systems: Portuguese Braille

Spanish Braille is the braille alphabet of Spanish and Galician. It is very close to French Braille, with the addition of a letter for ñ, slight modification of the accented letters and some differences in punctuation. Further conventions have been unified by the Latin American Blind Union, but differences with Spain remain.

== Alphabet ==
The French Braille letters for vowels with a grave accent, à è ù, are used in Spanish Braille for vowels with an acute accent, á é ú. In addition, French ⠻ ï is reassigned to Spanish ñ. Thus, in numerical order, the letters are:

a	b	c	d	e	f	g	h	i	j	k
l	m	n	o	p	q	r	s	t	u	v
x	y	z	á	é	ú	ñ	ü	w	í	ó

At one point, French ⠺ w was apparently used for Spanish ü, reflecting its pronunciation, and French ⠹ ô (a rotated v) for Spanish w, which is only found in foreign words.

== Digits ==
Digits are the first ten letters of the alphabet, and are marked by ⠼, as in English Braille.

== Punctuation ==
Single punctuation:

⠂ (braille pattern dots-2)	⠄ (braille pattern dots-3)	⠄ (braille pattern dots-3)	⠆ (braille pattern dots-23)	⠒ (braille pattern dots-25)	⠔ (braille pattern dots-35)	⠤ (braille pattern dots-36)	⠤ (braille pattern dots-36)	⠠ (braille pattern dots-6) ⠂ (braille pattern dots-2)
,	.	'	;	:	*	-	—	/

(The same character is used for a full stop and for an apostrophe, as in Portuguese Braille. Spanish does not use the apostrophe in standard writing, and in Portuguese it is only present in a few fixed phrases.)

Paired punctuation:

...	...	...	...	...	...	...
¿ ... ?	¡ ... !	(outer quotes)	(inner quotes)	( ... )	[ ... ]	{ ... }

== Formatting ==
⠼ (braille pattern dots-3456)	⠨ (braille pattern dots-46)	...
(digit)	(caps)	(start & stop emph.)

'Emphasis' may be bold or italic in print.

See Portuguese Braille for a more complete account, much of which is likely to apply to Spanish Braille.

== Other languages ==
The full Spanish Braille alphabet is used for Galician as well. The letter ⠻ for ñ is shared with Basque Braille (which has no additional letters) and with Guarani Braille (which does). It is not, however, used for the languages of the Philippines, which instead use an accent dot of English Braille with n, ⠈⠝, for ñ. (See basic braille.)

Punctuation for Galician and Basque Braille is the same as that of Spanish Braille.
