= Voiced velar approximant =

Consonantal sound represented by ⟨ɰ⟩ in IPA

ɰ

ɣ᫛
- IPA number: 154

Audio sample
- source · help

Encoding
- Entity (decimal): &#624;
- Unicode (hex): U+0270
- X-SAMPA: M\
- Braille: ⠦ (braille pattern dots-236) ⠍ (braille pattern dots-134)
Image

A voiced velar approximant is a type of consonantal sound, used in some spoken languages. The symbol in the International Phonetic Alphabet that represents this sound is ⟨ɰ⟩. If it is necessary to avoid the implication that the approximant is spread as its vocalic equivalent [ɯ] is, it may instead be transcribed ⟨ɣ̞⟩ or ⟨ɣ᫛⟩ (or ⟨ɣ˕⟩, which is now dated). This is the symbol of the voiced velar fricative ⟨ɣ⟩ with a lowering diacritic.

This consonant is absent from English, but may be approximated by making [ɡ] but with the tongue body lowered or [w] but with the lips apart. The voiced velar approximant can in many cases be considered the semivocalic counterpart of the close back unrounded vowel [ɯ]. ⟨ɰ⟩ and ⟨ɯ̯⟩ with the non-syllabic diacritic are sometimes used in different transcription systems to represent the same sound, though others make a distinction between them.

In some languages, such as Spanish, a voiced velar approximant is an allophone of /ɡ/ – see below.

For a voiced post-palatal approximant—sometimes also described as a voiced pre-velar approximant—which is more fronted in the place of articulation than a prototypical velar approximant, see Voiced palatal approximant § Post-palatal.

== Phonetic ambiguity and transcription usage ==
Some languages have a voiced velar approximant that is unspecified for rounding, and therefore cannot be considered the semivocalic equivalent of either [ɯ] or its rounded counterpart [u]. Examples of such languages are Catalan, Galician and Spanish, in which the spirant approximant (not semivowel) unspecified for rounding appears as an allophone of /ɡ/.

Eugenio Martínez Celdrán describes the voiced velar approximant as follows:

As for the symbol ⟨ɰ⟩, it is quite evidently inappropriate for representing the Spanish voiced velar approximant consonant. Many authors have pointed out the fact that [ɰ] is not rounded; for example, Pullum & Ladusaw (1986:98) state that 'the sound in question can be described as a semi-vowel (glide) with the properties "high", "back", and "unrounded"'. They even establish an interesting parallelism: 'the sound can be regarded as an unrounded [w]'. It is evident, then, that ⟨ɰ⟩ is not an adequate symbol for Spanish. First of all, because it has never been taken into consideration that there is a diphthong in words like paga 'pay', vago 'lazy', lego 'lay', etc., and, secondly, because this sound is rounded when it precedes rounded vowels. Besides, it would be utterly wrong to transcribe the word jugo 'juice' with ⟨ɰ⟩ *[ˈχuɰo], because the pronunciation of that consonant between two rounded vowels is completely rounded whereas [ɰ] is not. [...]

The symbol I have always proposed is ⟨ɣ̞⟩, the correlate to the other central approximants in Spanish, [β̞ ð̞] (Martínez Celdrán 1991, 1996:47). This coincides with Ball & Rahilly (1999:90), whose example for the three approximants is the Spanish word abogado 'lawyer'[...]. Ball & Rahilly too criticise in a footnote the confusion between these symbols: 'The difference between an approximant version of the voiced velar fricative [ɣ], and the velar semi-vowel [ɰ] is that the latter requires spread lips, and must have a slightly more open articulatory channel so that it becomes [ɯ] if prolonged' (p. 189, fn. 1).

There is a parallel problem with transcribing voiced palatal approximants.

In broad transcription, the lowering diacritic may be omitted, so that the symbol is rendered ⟨ɣ⟩ as with the corresponding fricative.

== Features ==
Features of a voiced velar approximant:

- Its manner of articulation is approximant, which means it is produced by narrowing the vocal tract at the place of articulation, but not enough to produce a turbulent airstream. The most common type of this approximant is glide or semivowel. The term glide emphasizes the characteristic of movement (or 'glide') of [ɰ] from the [ɯ] vowel position to a following vowel position. The term semivowel emphasizes that, although the sound is vocalic in nature, it is not 'syllabic' (it does not form the nucleus of a syllable). For a description of the spirant approximant variant used e.g. in Spanish, see § Phonetic ambiguity and transcription usage.
- Its place of articulation is velar, which means it is articulated with the back of the tongue (the dorsum) at the soft palate.
- Its phonation is voiced, which means the vocal cords vibrate during the articulation.
- It is an oral consonant, which means that air is not allowed to escape through the nose.
- It is a median consonant, which means it is produced by directing the airstream down the midline of the tongue, rather than to the sides.
- Its airstream mechanism is pulmonic, which means it is articulated by pushing air only with the intercostal muscles and abdominal muscles, as in most speech sounds.

== Occurrence ==
The following list includes languages with variable pronunciations.

Language		Word	IPA	Meaning	Notes
Aragonese		caixigo	[kajˈʃiɣ̞o̞]	'oak tree'	Approximant consonant unspecified for rounding; allophone of /ɡ/.
Astur-Leonese	Asturian				Approximant consonant unspecified for rounding; allophone of /ɡ/.
Astur-Leonese	Extremaduran				Approximant consonant unspecified for rounding; allophone of /ɡ/.
Astur-Leonese	Leonese				Approximant consonant unspecified for rounding; allophone of /ɡ/.
Astur-Leonese	Mirandese				Approximant consonant unspecified for rounding; allophone of /ɡ/.
Basque		hego	[eɣ̞o]	'wing'	Allophone of /ɡ/
Catalan		aigua	[ˈajɣ̞wə]	'water'	Approximant consonant unspecified for rounding; allophone of /ɡ/. See Catalan phonology
Cherokee		ᏩᏥ wa-tsi	[ɰad͡ʒi]	'watch'	Found only in the Western dialect. Its equivalent in other dialects is [w]. Also represented by Ꮺ, Ꮻ, Ꮼ, Ꮽ, and Ꮾ
Danish	Older speakers	talg	[ˈtsʰalˀɣ̞]	'tallow'	Approximant consonant unspecified for rounding. Still used by some older speakers in high register, much more commonly than a fricative [ɣ]. Depending on the environment, it corresponds to [w] or [j] in young speakers of contemporary Standard Danish. See Danish phonology
Dutch	Western East Flemish				Approximant consonant unspecified for rounding. Corresponds to a fricative [ɣ] in other dialects.
French	Belgian	ara	[aɣ̞a]	'macaw'	Approximant consonant unspecified for rounding. Intervocalic, word-internal allophone of /ʀ/ for some speakers. See French phonology
Galician		órgano	[ˈɔrɣ̞ɑ̟nʊ]	'organ'	Approximant consonant unspecified for rounding; allophone of /ɡ/. See Galician phonology
Greek	Cypriot	μαγαζί	[maɰazˈzi]	'shop'	Allophone of /ɣ/.
Guarani		gotyo	[ɰoˈtɨo]	'near, close to'	Contrasts with [w]
Guarani	Ñandewa Paulista-Paranaense		[adʒaˈɰa]	'I cut'	Contrasts with [ɡ].
Hiw		wr̄og	[wɡ͡ʟɔɣ̞]	'through'	Contrasts with /w/ and with /ɡ͡ʟ/.
Ibibio		ufokọ	[úfʌ̟̀ɰɔ̞]		Intervocalic allophone of /k/; may be a uvular tap [ɢ̆] instead.
Icelandic		Skagabyggð	[ˈskɐːɣ̞ɐˌpɪɣ̞θ]	'Skagabyggð'	Approximant consonant unspecified for rounding. See Icelandic phonology
Irish		naoi	[n̪ˠɰiː]	'nine'	Occurs only between broad consonants and front vowels. See Irish phonology
Judeo-Spanish		gato	[ˈɣ̞at̪o]	'cat'	
Korean		의사 / uisa	[ɰisɐ]	'doctor'	Occurs only before /i/. See Korean phonology
Mwotlap		haghag	[haɣ̞haɣ̞]	'sit'	Contrasts with [w].
Occitan	Gascon	digoc	[diˈɣ̞uk]	'said' (3rd pers. sg.)	
Shipibo		igi	[i̞ɣ̞i̞]		Unspecified for rounding; varies between an approximant and a fricative. Allophone of /k/ in certain high-frequency morphemes.
Spanish	Most dialects	pagar	[päˈɣ̞äɾ]	'to pay'	Approximant consonant unspecified for rounding. Ranges from close fricative to approximant. Allophone of /ɡ/. See Spanish phonology
Spanish	Standard European	blog	[ˈbloɣ̞̊]	'blog'	Also described as a fricative. Allophone of /ɡ/ before a pause. See Spanish phonology
Swedish	Central Standard	temadagarna	[ˈtʰîɛ̠mɐˌdɒ̟ːɣæɳɐ̞]	'themed day'	Approximant consonant unspecified for rounding; allophone of /ɡ/ in casual speech. See Swedish phonology
Tagalog		igriega	[iːɡɾɪˈje̞ɣ̞ɐ]	'y (letter)'	Approximant consonant unspecified for rounding; intervocalic allophone of /ɡ/. See Tagalog phonology
Tiwi		ngaga	[ˈŋaɰa]	'we (inclusive)'	
Vietnamese	Southern	gặp	[ɣ̞ap̚˨˩˨]	'to meet, to see'	Typical realization of /ɡɣ/ or /ɣ/ in other dialects. Variant is in complementary distribution before open vowels.

=== Nasal ===
Voiced velar nasal approximant

ɰ̃

ɣ̃˕

Audio sample
- source · help

A voiced velar nasal approximant is a type of consonantal sound used in some spoken languages. The symbol in the International Phonetic Alphabet that represents this sound is typically ⟨ɰ̃⟩ or ⟨ɣ̞̃⟩.

Language		Word	IPA	Meaning	Notes
Guaraní	Paraguayan	guaraníme	[ɰ̃ʷãɾ̃ãˈnĩmẽ]	'in Guarani'	Allophone of /ɰ/ due to nasal vowel–consonant harmony, though typically retains some degree of labialization; may therefore be closer to [w̃].
Japanese		三位 / san'i	[sɑ̃ɰ̃ːi]	'third rank'	Syllable-final moraic nasal realization; broadly described as dorso-velar, though exact placement of articulation varies. See Japanese phonology
Nizaa		ŋun	[ɰ̃ʊ˧n]	'boy/girl'	Non-syllable coda realization of [ŋ]. See Nizaa phonology.
Ikwerre		[àˈɣ̞̃ã́]		'to bask in the sun'	Allophone of /ɣ̞/ before nasal vowels, due to nasal vowel-consonant harmony.

== Bunched or molar r ==
Voiced velar bunched approximant

ɹ̈

Encoding
- X-SAMPA: r\_"

Some languages have a velar approximant that is produced with the body of the tongue bunched up at the velum and simultaneous pharyngealization. This gives rise to a type of retroflex resonance that is nearly indistinguishable from [ɻ]. Catford (1982) [1977] described this sound precisely as an "apico-postalveolarized, advanced velar approximant". The extensions to the IPA describes the sound as a "bunched r" or "molar r" and recommends the use of the centralized diacritic, ⟨ɹ̈⟩, to distinguish the bunched realization from the apical articulation ⟨ɹ̺⟩. Typically, the diacritic is omitted, so that the sound is transcribed simply with ⟨ɹ⟩ or ⟨ɻ⟩ as if it were a coronal consonant.

In Dutch, this type of r is called Gooise r [ˌɣoːisə ˈʔɛr] 'Gooi r'. It is named after het Gooi, a region of the Netherlands where Hilversum (the main centre for television and radio broadcasting) is located.

=== Features ===
Features of a voiced velar bunched approximant:

- Its manner of articulation is approximant, which means it is produced by narrowing the vocal tract at the place of articulation, but not enough to produce a turbulent airstream. The body of the tongue is bunched up at the velum, rather than just approaching it as it is the case with the prototypical velar approximant.
- Its place of articulation is velar, which means it is articulated with the back of the tongue (the dorsum) at the soft palate.
- Its phonation is voiced, which means the vocal cords vibrate during the articulation.
- It is an oral consonant, which means that air is not allowed to escape through the nose.
- It is a median consonant, which means it is produced by directing the airstream down the midline of the tongue, rather than to the sides.
- Its airstream mechanism is pulmonic, which means it is articulated by pushing air only with the intercostal muscles and abdominal muscles, as in most speech sounds.

=== Occurrence ===
Language		Word	IPA	Meaning	Notes
Dutch	Randstad varieties	maar	[ˈmaːɹ̈]	'but'	Common allophone of /r/ in the syllable coda, where it contrasts with [w]. The bunching and pharyngealization may be lost in connected speech, resulting in a semivowel such as [j] or [ə̯]. See Dutch phonology
Dutch	Standard Northern	maar	[ˈmaːɹ̈]	'but'	Common allophone of /r/ in the syllable coda, where it contrasts with [w]. The bunching and pharyngealization may be lost in connected speech, resulting in a semivowel such as [j] or [ə̯]. See Dutch phonology
English	American	red	[ɹ̈ʷɛd]	'red'	Possible realization of /r/; auditorily indistinguishable from apical [ɹ̺]. See Pronunciation of English /r/
English	Received Pronunciation	curious	[ˈkj̊ʊːɹ̈iəs]	'curious'	Possible realization of /r/; auditorily indistinguishable from apical [ɹ̺]. See Pronunciation of English /r/

== See also ==
- Index of phonetics articles

== Notes ==
Place →	Labial					Coronal										Dorsal					Laryngeal			
Manner ↓	Bilabial		Labiodental		Linguolabial		Dental		Alveolar		Postalveolar		Retroflex		(Alveolo-)palatal		Velar		Uvular		Pharyngeal/epiglottal		Glottal	
Nasal	m̥	m	ɱ̊	ɱ		n̼	n̪̊	n̪	n̥	n	n̠̊	n̠	ɳ̊	ɳ	ɲ̊	ɲ	ŋ̊	ŋ	ɴ̥	ɴ				
Plosive	p	b	p̪	b̪	t̼	d̼	t̪	d̪	t	d			ʈ	ɖ	c	ɟ	k	ɡ	q	ɢ	ʡ		ʔ	
Sibilant affricate							t̪s̪	d̪z̪	ts	dz	t̠ʃ	d̠ʒ	tʂ	dʐ	tɕ	dʑ								
Non-sibilant affricate	pɸ	bβ	p̪f	b̪v			t̪θ	d̪ð	tɹ̝̊	dɹ̝	t̠ɹ̠̊˔	d̠ɹ̠˔			cç	ɟʝ	kx	ɡɣ	qχ	ɢʁ	ʡʜ	ʡʢ	ʔh	
Sibilant fricative							s̪	z̪	s	z	ʃ	ʒ	ʂ	ʐ	ɕ	ʑ								
Non-sibilant fricative	ɸ	β	f	v	θ̼	ð̼	θ	ð	θ̠	ð̠	ɹ̠̊˔	ɹ̠˔	ɻ̊˔	ɻ˔	ç	ʝ	x	ɣ	χ	ʁ	ħ	ʕ	h	ɦ
Approximant		β̞		ʋ				ð̞		ɹ		ɹ̠		ɻ		j		ɰ						˷
Tap/flap		ⱱ̟		ⱱ					ɾ̥	ɾ			ɽ̊	ɽ						ɢ̆		ʡ̆		
Trill	ʙ̥	ʙ							r̥	r		r̠	ɽ̊r̥	ɽr					ʀ̥	ʀ	ʜ	ʢ		
Lateral affricate									tɬ	dɮ			tꞎ	d𝼅	c𝼆	ɟʎ̝	k𝼄	ɡʟ̝						
Lateral fricative							ɬ̪		ɬ	ɮ			ꞎ	𝼅	𝼆	ʎ̝	𝼄	ʟ̝						
Lateral approximant								l̪	l̥	l		l̠	ɭ̊	ɭ	ʎ̥	ʎ	ʟ̥	ʟ		ʟ̠				
Lateral tap/flap									ɺ̥	ɺ			𝼈̊	𝼈		ʎ̆		ʟ̆						

		BL	LD	D	A	PA	RF	P	V	U
Implosive	Voiced	ɓ			ɗ		ᶑ	ʄ	ɠ	ʛ
Implosive	Voiceless	ɓ̥			ɗ̥		ᶑ̊	ʄ̊	ɠ̊	ʛ̥
Ejective	Stop	pʼ			tʼ		ʈʼ	cʼ	kʼ	qʼ
Ejective	Affricate		p̪fʼ	tθʼ	tsʼ	tʃʼ	tʂʼ	tɕʼ	kxʼ	qχʼ
Ejective	Fricative	ɸʼ	fʼ	θʼ	sʼ	ʃʼ	ʂʼ	ɕʼ	xʼ	χʼ
Ejective	Lateral affricate				tɬʼ			c𝼆ʼ	k𝼄ʼ	q𝼄ʼ
Ejective	Lateral fricative				ɬʼ					
Click (top: velar; bottom: uvular)	Tenuis	kʘ qʘ		kǀ qǀ	kǃ qǃ		k𝼊 q𝼊	kǂ qǂ		
Click (top: velar; bottom: uvular)	Voiced	ɡʘ ɢʘ		ɡǀ ɢǀ	ɡǃ ɢǃ		ɡ𝼊 ɢ𝼊	ɡǂ ɢǂ		
Click (top: velar; bottom: uvular)	Nasal	ŋʘ ɴʘ		ŋǀ ɴǀ	ŋǃ ɴǃ		ŋ𝼊 ɴ𝼊	ŋǂ ɴǂ	ʞ	
Click (top: velar; bottom: uvular)	Tenuis lateral				kǁ qǁ					
Click (top: velar; bottom: uvular)	Voiced lateral				ɡǁ ɢǁ					
Click (top: velar; bottom: uvular)	Nasal lateral				ŋǁ ɴǁ					
