= Guarani alphabet =

Alphabet used for the South American language

The Guarani alphabet (achegety) is used to write the Guarani language, spoken mostly in Paraguay and nearby countries. The alphabet currently adopted by the Academy of the Guarani Language consists of 33 letters.

== Orthography ==
Majuscule forms (also called uppercase or capital letters)
A	Ã	Ch	E	Ẽ	G	G̃	H	I	Ĩ	J	K	L	M	Mb	N	Nd	Ng	Nt	Ñ	O	Õ	P	R	Rr	S	T	U	Ũ	V	Y	Ỹ	'
Minuscule forms (also called lowercase or small letters)
a	ã	ch	e	ẽ	g	g̃	h	i	ĩ	j	k	l	m	mb	n	nd	ng	nt	ñ	o	õ	p	r	rr	s	t	u	ũ	v	y	ỹ	'
IPA values
a	ã	ʃ~ɕ	e	ẽ	ɰ~ɣ	ŋ	h	i	ĩ	ʝ~dʒ	k	l	m	ᵐb	n	ⁿd	ᵑɡ	ⁿt	ɲ	o	õ	p	ɾ	ʐ	s	t	u	ũ	ʋ	ɨ	ɨ̃	ʔ

Their respective names are:

a, ã, che, e, ẽ, ge, g̃e, he, i, ĩ, je, ke, le, me, mbe, ne, nde, nge, nte, ñe, o, õ, pe, re, rre, se, te, u, ũ, ve, y, ỹ, puso.

== Description ==
The six letters ⟨a, e, i, o, u, and y⟩ denote vowel sounds, the same as in Spanish, except that ⟨y⟩ is a high central vowel, [ɨ]. The vowel variants with a tilde are nasalized. (Older books used diaereses or circumflexes to mark nasalization.) The apostrophe ⟨'⟩ called "puso" (lit., sound cut off) represents a glottal stop [ʔ]; older books wrote it with ⟨h⟩. All the other letters (including ⟨ñ⟩, ⟨g̃⟩, and the digraphs) are consonants, pronounced for the most part as in Spanish.

The Latin letters b, c, and d are used only as parts of digraphs outside of some loanwords,

Despite its spelling, the ⟨ch⟩ digraph is not the Spanish affricate sound [tʃ] (English ⟨ch⟩ as in teach), but an alveolo-palatal fricative [ɕ] (similar English ⟨sh⟩ as in ship, or French ⟨ch⟩ as in chapeau). Occasionally, ⟨x⟩ is written for this sound, following Portuguese and medieval Spanish usage.

⟨g⟩ is the voiced velar approximant [ɰ], similar to Spanish haga; it is not a plosive ([ɡ]) as in English gate.

⟨v⟩ is the English and French voiced labiodental fricative [v], as in Victor, not the Spanish bilabial. It is also pronounced as the labiodental approximant [ʋ], which is like [w] with the lower lip touching the upper teeth.

⟨h⟩ [h] and ⟨j⟩ [dʒ] are used with their English values, as in hand and jelly; older books wrote these sounds with ⟨jh⟩ and ⟨y⟩, respectively. For some speakers, [h] freely varies with the Spanish [x], like the ⟨j⟩ in José. In some dialects, the letter ⟨j⟩ is typically pronounced as [ʝ] (a voiced palatal fricative) or [ɟʝ] (a voiced palatal affricate).

The tilded versions of E, I, U, Y, and G are not available in ISO Latin-1 fonts, but can be represented in Unicode (except that tilded "G" is not available as a single precomposed letter, and must be encoded as a plain "G" plus a combining tilde). In digital environments where those glyphs are not available, the tilde is often postfixed to the base character ("E~", "I~", "U~", "Y~", "G~") or a circumflex is used instead ("Ê", "Î", "Û", "Ŷ", "Ĝ").

The acute accent "´" is used to indicate the stress (muanduhe), as in áva [ˈava] ("hair") and tái [ˈtai] ("peppery"). When omitted, the stress falls on a nasalized vowel, or, if none, on the last syllable, as in syva [sɨˈva] ("forehead") and tata [taˈta] ("fire").

== History ==
Up to the Spanish Conquest of the Americas in the 16th century, the Guaraní people did not have a writing system. The first written texts in Guaraní were produced by Jesuit missionaries, using the Latin script. The priest Antonio Ruíz de Montoya documented the language in his works Tesoro de la lengua guaraní (a Guarani-Spanish dictionary, printed in 1639) and Arte y bocabvlario de la lengua guaraní (a grammar compendium and dictionary, printed in 1722) among others.

The alphabet and spelling used in those early books were somewhat inconsistent and substantially different from the modern ones. In 1867, Mariscal Francisco Solano López, president of Paraguay, convened a Script Council to regulate the writing, but the effort was not successful.

The orthography was finally standardized in its present form in 1950, at the Guarani Language Congress in Montevideo, by initiative of Reinaldo Julián Decoud Larrosa. The standards was influenced by the International Phonetic Alphabet notation, and it is now universally used in Paraguay.

Nonetheless, there is still some disagreement between literates on details of the standard. Some feel that the digraph ⟨ch⟩ should be changed to ⟨x⟩ (as in Portuguese, Galician and Old Spanish), and that ⟨g̃⟩ should be replaced by plain ⟨g⟩, with the tilde being placed on one of the adjacent vowels.

The Guarani name for the alphabet, achegety, is a neologism formed from a-che-ge (the names of the first three letters) and ty meaning "grouping", "ensemble".

== Toponyms and proper names ==
There are many toponyms and some proper names derived from Guarani in Bolivia, Argentina, Uruguay, Paraguay, and Brazil. These are usually written according to the Spanish and Portuguese systems, and their pronunciation has often changed considerably over the centuries, to the point that they may no longer be understood by modern Guarani speakers.

== See also ==
- Guarani Braille
