= David Galeano Olivera =

Paraguayan academic (born 1961)

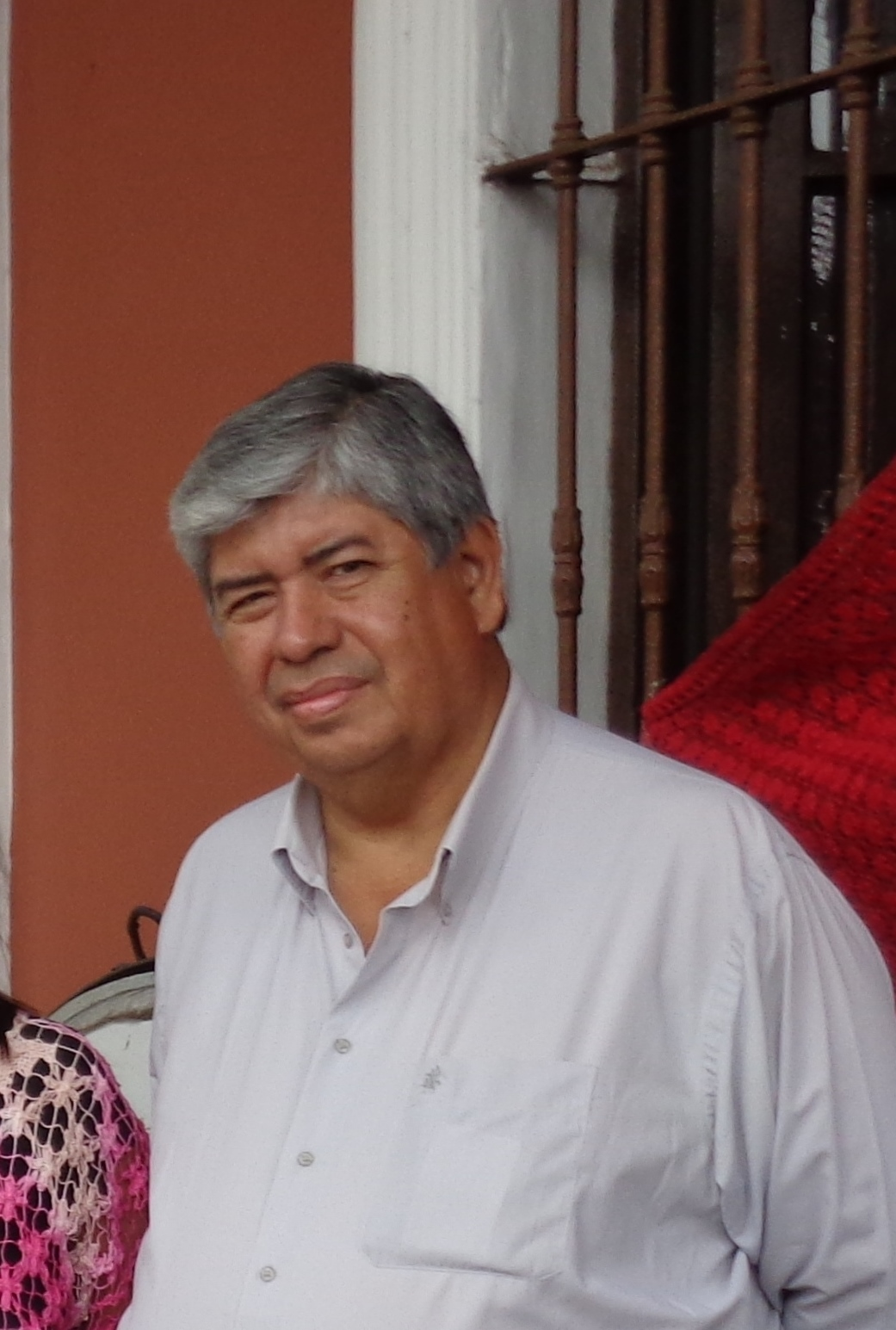
- Olivera in 2016
- Born: David Abdón Galeano Olivera; February 18, 1961; Asunción, Paraguay

Academic background
- Education: Universidad Nacional de Asunción

David Abdón Galeano Olivera (born 18 February 1961) is a Paraguayan linguist, anthropologist, philologist, translator, and educator. He is also the president and founder of the Guarani Language and Culture Athenaeum, and one of the initiators of the Guarani version of Wikipedia. In 2017, he ventured into science communication as a columnist for the portal Ciencia del Sur.

== Early life and education ==
David Abdón Galeano Olivera was born in Asunción on 18 February 1961.

He Olivera studied at Gral. Bernardino Caballero College in Asunción in 1979. He received his bachelor's degree in Guarani at the Universidad Nacional de Asunción in 1985. He earned doctorates in the following specialties: Linguistics and Philology of Guarani (in 1998–1999), Methodology of Research (2000), University Didactics (1994–1995), and Common Linguistics (1987). At Ntra. Sra. de la Asunción Catholic University he became a Doctor of Anthropology (1988) and International Anthropology and Ethnology (1991).

== Work at university ==
Dr. Olivera is a professor at Universidad Nacional de Asunción and teaches Philosophy (philology of Guarani), Medicine, Poli-technology, Nature, and Exact Sciences. He is the head of the Anthropology, Research Methodology, Sociology and Spanish department.

== Guarani language ==
Dr. Olivera founded the Lyceum of Guarani Language and Culture (Ateneo de Lengua y Cultura Guarani) in 1985 and has been its president since then. He is also a Grammar, Literature, Didactics and Culture professor at the lyceum. Dr. Olivera is an activist for the propagation of the Guarani language and culture, and he organizes various cultural events, conferences, seminars, and forums about Guarani in Paraguay. He is a member of various government and UN commissions on Paraguayan culture. Dr. Olivera is also the author of numerous books on Guarani and Paraguayan culture. Dr. Olivera has won various national and international prizes as a result of his work.

== Bibliography ==
- Mbo’ehao arapapaha Guarani ha España ñe’ême - Calendario Escolar Bilingüe (1988)
- Jakavere ypykue (15 káso ñemombe’u) (1989)
- Guarani Rayhupápe mbohapyha (1995)
- Guarani Rayhupápe irundyha (1995)
- Differencias gramaticales entre el Guarani y el Castellano: estudio contrastivo, y su incidencia en la educación (1999)
- Káso Ñemombe’u (1999)
- Antropología – Avakuaaty (2002)
- Guarani Ñe’êkuaaty – Lingüística (en) Guarani (2002)
- Sentimientos - Temiandu Pytu (2002)
- Pukarâmeme (2007)
- Pukarântevoi (2007)

He also writes articles in newspapers and magazines, and essays for conferences.

== Family ==
Mr. David Galeano Olivera lives in Capiatá, Central department with his wife Sabina (specialist in Guarani) and his four children Edgar, Norma, Jorge and Anai.
