= Jopara =

Variety of the Guarani language

- Yopará, guarañol
- Pronunciation: [ɟopaˈɾa]
- Native to: Paraguay
- Ethnicity: most Paraguayans
- Language family: Tupian: Tupi–Guarani; Guarani (I); Guaraní; Jopara

Language codes
- ISO 639-3: –
- Glottolog: jopa1240

Jopara (Guarani pronunciation: [ɟopaˈɾa]) or Yopará (Spanish: [ɟʝopaˈɾa]) is a colloquial form of Guarani spoken in Paraguay which uses a number of Spanish loan words. Its name is from the Guarani word for “mixture”. The majority of Paraguayans, particularly younger ones, speak some form of Jopara.

== Social context ==
Speakers of both Guarani and Spanish typically employ a great deal of code-switching between the two languages, hence why the blending of the two languages is called "Jopara", meaning 'mixture'. The relative amount of Guarani or Spanish used in speech varies depending upon the birthplace of the speakers, the place where they speak, with whom they are speaking, the topic of discussion, and how they want their meaning to be interpreted. Generally, the rural and older population tends to use more Guarani, while the urban and younger population uses more Spanish—the rural and older population understands more Guarani and the urban and younger more Spanish. General and everyday conversation is often suited to Guarani, while technical and specific or formal conversation is often suited for Spanish.

Since 1992, under Paraguay's Ministry of Education and Culture (MEC) Act, Guarani in its "pure form"—different from the day-to-day speech of Jopara—has been taught in schools. This has led to contradictory opinions: some say that teaching pure Guarani is the best means to preserve the language's integrity, while others argue that how Guarani is taught differs greatly from how it is commonly spoken.

== Lexicon ==
Many grammatical markers for features found in Guarani but not in Spanish, like evidentiality markers, are borrowed from Guarani. For example (Guarani words in bold):

- La niña **ndaje** no comía más casi dos días **voi** y por eso estaba un poco desnutrida, pero el tua **ánga** igual le pegaba
- **It is said** that the girl would not eat for more than two days. **Well,** for that reason she was somewhat malnourished, but the **stepfather** would still hit her.

Some Spanish words, when put in a sentence mixed with Guarani, have a different meaning from that of standard Spanish. They can come from calques of equivalent Guarani expressions. For example:

- Tu hijo creció **todo ya**.
- **Ituichapáma** nememby.
- Your son grew **all already**.

In some instances, Jopara speakers simply substitute a word in either Guarani or Spanish while speaking. For example:

- **Moõ opyta** [la/nde] baño?
- **Where is** the/your bathroom?

== See also ==
- Diglossia
