= Guarani Wikipedia =

Guarani-language edition of Wikipedia

- Website type: Internet encyclopedia
- Owner: Wikimedia Foundation
- Website: https://gn.wikipedia.org
- Commercial: No
- Registration: Optional
- Launched: 2005
- Content license: Creative Commons Attribution/ Share-Alike 4.0 (most text also dual-licensed under GFDL); Media licensing varies

The Guarani Wikipedia (Guarani: Vikipetã) is the Guarani language edition of the free online encyclopedia Wikipedia.

== History ==
This Wikipedia was created in 2005, as a collaboration between the Lithuanian Šarūnas Šimkus, then a teenager, and Paraguayan academic David Galeano Olivera. The idea is to promote the usage and modernisation of the Guarani language.

In December 2012, Wikimedia Argentina published a booklet, "Vikipetã mbo’eha kotýpe", devoted to this version of the virtual encyclopedia.

Several workshops on Guarani Wikipedia have been carried out throughout Paraguay, jointly organized by Wikimedia Argentina and Fundación Paraguay Educa (an institution working on the OLPC project).

The University of Leipzig has elaborated a corpus based on Guarani Wikipedia.

== Users and editors ==
Guarani Wikipedia statistics
Number of user accounts	Number of active Users	Number of articles	Number of files	Number of administrators
23517	31	6034	0	2

== See also ==
- History of Wikipedia
- Reliability of Wikipedia
- Wikipedia community

== Bibliography ==
- McCarty, Teresa L.; Nicholas, Sheilah E.; Wigglesworth, Gillian, eds. (2019). A world of Indigenous languages: Politics, pedagogies and prospects for language reclamation. Bristol: Multilingual Matters. ISBN 978-1-78892-305-7.

Indigenous languages of the Americas with Wikipedia
Item	Label/en	native label	Code	distribution map	number of speakers, writers, or signers	UNESCO language status	Ethnologue language status	?itemwiki
Q36806	Southern Quechua	qu:Urin Qichwa qu:Qhichwa qu:Qichwa	qu		6000000	2 vulnerable		Quechua Wikipedia
Q35876	Guarani	gn:Avañe'ẽ	gn		4850000	1 safe	1 National	Guarani Wikipedia
Q4627	Aymara	ay:Aymar aru	ay		4000000	2 vulnerable		Aymara Wikipedia
Q13300	Nahuatl	nah:Nawatlahtolli nah:nawatl nah:mexkatl	nah		1925620	2 vulnerable		Nahuatl Wikipedia
Q891085	Wayuu	guc:Wayuunaiki	guc		300000	2 vulnerable	5 Developing	Wayuu Wikipedia
Q33730	Mapudungun	arn:Mapudungun	arn		300000	3 definitely endangered	6b Threatened	Mapuche Wikipedia
Q13310	Navajo	nv:Diné bizaad nv:Diné	nv		169369	2 vulnerable	6b Threatened	Navajo Wikipedia
Q25355	Greenlandic	kl:Kalaallisut	kl		56200	2 vulnerable	1 National	Greenlandic Wikipedia
Q29921	Inuktitut	ike-cans:ᐃᓄᒃᑎᑐᑦ iu:Inuktitut	iu		39770	2 vulnerable		Inuktitut Wikipedia
Q33388	Cherokee	chr:ᏣᎳᎩ ᎧᏬᏂᎯᏍᏗ chr:ᏣᎳᎩ	chr		12300	4 severely endangered	8a Moribund	Cherokee Wikipedia
Q33390	Cree	cr:ᐃᔨᔨᐤ ᐊᔨᒧᐎᓐ' cr:nēhiyawēwin	cr		10875; 8040			Cree Wikipedia
Q32979	Choctaw	cho:Chahta anumpa cho:Chahta	cho		9200	2 vulnerable	6b Threatened	Choctaw Wikipedia
Q56590	Atikamekw	atj:Atikamekw Nehiromowin atj:Atikamekw	atj		6160	2 vulnerable	5 Developing	Atikamekw Wikipedia
Q27183	Iñupiaq	ik:Iñupiatun	ik		5580	4 severely endangered		Inupiat Wikipedia
Q523014	Muscogee	mus:Mvskoke	mus		4300	3 definitely endangered	7 Shifting	Muscogee Wikipedia
Q33265	Cheyenne	chy:Tsêhesenêstsestôtse	chy		2400	3 definitely endangered	8a Moribund	Cheyenne Wikipedia
