= Wayuu Wikipedia =

Wayuu-language edition of Wikipedia

- Website type: Internet encyclopedia project
- Available in: Wayuu
- Owner: Wikimedia Foundation
- Website: guc.wikipedia.org
- Commercial: No
- Registration: Optional
- Launched: 27 February 2023; 3 years ago

The Wayuu Wikipedia (Wikipeetia süka wayuunaiki) is an edition of Wikipedia in the Wayuu language. It was created on 27 February 2023. The Wayuu Wikipedia project was in the Wikimedia Incubator between 2008 and 2023 and was developed by activists, teachers, professors, directors and leaders of the Wayuu people with the support of the Wayuu Digital Network. The Wayuu Wikipedia is the Wikipedia with the least articles to have a page on the English Wikipedia.

== History ==
In August 2008, a group of Venezuelan activists presented the Wikipedia and Wiktionary projects in Wayuu to the language committee of the Wikimedia Foundation. Both projects were approved and entered the Wikimedia Incubator.

== Milestones ==
- 7 August 2008: The Wayuu project is created at the Wikimedia Incubator.
- 27 February 2023: The Wayuu Wikipedia is launched with 459 articles.

Indigenous languages of the Americas with Wikipedia
Item	Label/en	native label	Code	distribution map	number of speakers, writers, or signers	UNESCO language status	Ethnologue language status	?itemwiki
Q36806	Southern Quechua	qu:Urin Qichwa qu:Qhichwa qu:Qichwa	qu		6000000	2 vulnerable		Quechua Wikipedia
Q35876	Guarani	gn:Avañe'ẽ	gn		4850000	1 safe	1 National	Guarani Wikipedia
Q4627	Aymara	ay:Aymar aru	ay		4000000	2 vulnerable		Aymara Wikipedia
Q13300	Nahuatl	nah:Nawatlahtolli nah:nawatl nah:mexkatl	nah		1925620	2 vulnerable		Nahuatl Wikipedia
Q891085	Wayuu	guc:Wayuunaiki	guc		300000	2 vulnerable	5 Developing	Wayuu Wikipedia
Q33730	Mapudungun	arn:Mapudungun	arn		300000	3 definitely endangered	6b Threatened	Mapuche Wikipedia
Q13310	Navajo	nv:Diné bizaad nv:Diné	nv		169369	2 vulnerable	6b Threatened	Navajo Wikipedia
Q25355	Greenlandic	kl:Kalaallisut	kl		56200	2 vulnerable	1 National	Greenlandic Wikipedia
Q29921	Inuktitut	ike-cans:ᐃᓄᒃᑎᑐᑦ iu:Inuktitut	iu		39770	2 vulnerable		Inuktitut Wikipedia
Q33388	Cherokee	chr:ᏣᎳᎩ ᎧᏬᏂᎯᏍᏗ chr:ᏣᎳᎩ	chr		12300	4 severely endangered	8a Moribund	Cherokee Wikipedia
Q33390	Cree	cr:ᐃᔨᔨᐤ ᐊᔨᒧᐎᓐ' cr:nēhiyawēwin	cr		10875; 8040			Cree Wikipedia
Q32979	Choctaw	cho:Chahta anumpa cho:Chahta	cho		9200	2 vulnerable	6b Threatened	Choctaw Wikipedia
Q56590	Atikamekw	atj:Atikamekw Nehiromowin atj:Atikamekw	atj		6160	2 vulnerable	5 Developing	Atikamekw Wikipedia
Q27183	Iñupiaq	ik:Iñupiatun	ik		5580	4 severely endangered		Inupiat Wikipedia
Q523014	Muscogee	mus:Mvskoke	mus		4300	3 definitely endangered	7 Shifting	Muscogee Wikipedia
Q33265	Cheyenne	chy:Tsêhesenêstsestôtse	chy		2400	3 definitely endangered	8a Moribund	Cheyenne Wikipedia
