= Pedagogical grammar =

Approach to teaching languages

A pedagogical grammar is a modern approach in linguistics intended to aid in teaching an additional language.

== Structure ==
This method of teaching is divided into the descriptive: grammatical analysis, and the prescriptive: the articulation of a set of rules. Following an analysis of the context in which it is to be used, one grammatical form or arrangement of words will be determined to be the most appropriate. It helps in learning the grammar of foreign languages. Pedagogical grammars typically require rules that are definite, coherent, non-technical, cumulative and heuristic. As the rules themselves accumulate, an axiomatic system is formed between the two languages that should then enable a native speaker of the first to learn the second.

== Notes ==
- Chalker, S. 'Pedagogical grammar: principles and problems,' in Bygate, M. (ed.) Grammar and the Language Teacher, (London: Prentice Hall, 1994)
- Ellis, R. 'Current issues in the teaching of grammar: an SLA perspective.' in TESOL Quarterly, 40/1: 83-107.
