= List of organisms with names derived from Indigenous languages of the Americas =

This list includes organisms whose common or scientific names are drawn from indigenous languages of the Americas. When the common name of the organism in English derives from an indigenous language of the Americas, it is given first.

In biological nomenclature, organisms receive scientific names, which are formally in Latin, but may be drawn from any language and many have incorporated words from indigenous language of the Americas. These scientific names are generally formally published in peer-reviewed journal articles or larger monographs along with descriptions of the named taxa and ways to distinguish them from other taxa.

== List ==
Taxon	Type	Source language	Notes	Taxon image	Ref
Abalone (Haliotis)	sea snail	Rumsen	From aūlun ("Red abalone"), via Spanish		
Açaí palm (Euterpe oleracea)	palm tree	Nheengatu	From asai, ultimately from Tupian ĩwasa'i ("[fruit that] cries / expels water"), via Portuguese		
Achiote (Bixa orellana)	malval	Nahuatl	From āchiotl ("shrub")		
Acouchi (Myoprocta)	rodent	Guarani or Tupi	Probably from agutí, agoutí, or acutí, names for the animal, via French. In Brazilian Portuguese acutí is pronounced acuchí.		
Agouti (Dasyprocta)	rodent	Guarani or Tupi	From agutí, agoutí, or acutí, names for the animal.		
Ahytherium †	ground sloth	Tupi	From Ahy ("sloth") and Greek therion ("beast")		
Aivukus †	walrus	Yup'ik	From Aivuk ("walrus")		
Akodon toba	rodent	Toba-Qom	Named after the Toba people, who live in the region where the animal is found		
Akodon tucamanensis	rodent	Quechua	Named for the Tucumán Province, perhaps from yucumán ("origin of many rivers") or tucma ("the end of things").		
Allkaruen koi †	pterosaur	Tehuelche	From All ("brain") and karuen ("ancient"). The name was chosen because the holotype consists of a fossilised braincase. The specific name, koi means "lake", since the type locality would have been a saline lake.		
Alpaca (Lama pacos)	camelid	Aymara	From allpaca, the Aymara name for the animal, related to Quechua p'ake ("yellowish-red").		
Alnashetri †	alvarezsaurid	Tehuelche (Günün‑a‑kunna dialect)	The genus name means "slender thighs" because of its long and slender hind limbs		
Ananas comosus (pineapple)	bromeliad	Tupi	The generic name derives from nanas, the Tupi name of the fruit.		
Andalgalomys (Chaco mouse)	rodent	Quechua	Named after the Andalgalá river, ultimately from Quechua "Lord of the Hare" or "Lord of the High Mountain", and Greek mys ("mouse").		
Andean condor (Vultur gryphus)	New World vulture	Quechua	The common name derives from kuntur, via Spanish.		
Andinomys edax (Andean mouse)	rodent	Quechua	From the Andes Mountains, probably from Quechua anti ("east"), and Greek mys ("mouse")		
Ankonetta †	duck	Tehuelche (Aónikenk dialect)	Anko means "father," referring to Claudio Larriestra, a palaeontologist who worked in Patagonia, where the holotype was found. -netta is derived from Greek "duck".		
Aoniraptor †	megaraptoran	Tehuelche	Aoni means south, Latin word raptor is Latin for "thief".		
Ara	macaw	Tupi	From ará ("macaw"), an onomatopoeia based on the sound of their call.		
Arackar licanantay †	titanosaur	Kunza †	Arackar means "skeleton" and licanatay is another name for the Atacama people, the indigenous inhabitants of the region where the holotype was found, who previously spoke Kunza		
Aratasaurus museunacionali †	basal coelurosaur	Tupi	The genus name means "lizard born from fire" from Tupi ara "born" and atá "fire," and Greek saurus "lizard". The name refers to the National Museum of Brazil fire, which the holotype survived unscathed. The species name also is the Portuguese name of the museum.		
Aratinga	parakeet	Tupi	Ará tinga means "bright bird" or "bright parrot".		
Araucariaceae and Araucaria	conifer	Mapudungun via Spanish	Named for the Spanish exonym Araucano ("from Arauco"), ultimately from Mapudungun rag ko ("clayey water").		
Arracacha (Arracacia xanthorrhiza)	umbellifer	Quechua	The common and generic names derive from raqacha, via Spanish		
Assapan, southern flying squirrel (Glaucomys volans)	squirrel	Eastern Algonquian, Powhatan	"Assapan", the common name in the Southern United States is first attested as assapanick and was borrowed from Powhatan, but this is disputed.		
Athabascasaurus †	ichthyosaur	Woods Cree	From the Athabasca oil sands area where the holotype was collected, themselves named after the Athabasca River, ultimately from Woods Cree aðapaskāw, which means "[where] there are plants one after another", as well as Greek sauros ("lizard").		
Attalea cohune (cohune palm)	palm	Miskito	The common and specific names derive from ókhún, via Spanish.		
Avocado (Persea americana)	laurel	Nahuatl	From āhuacatl via Spanish. The word is often said to derive from the Nahuatl word for testicle, but this meaning was secondary and euphemistic.		
Axolotl (Ambystoma mexicanum)	salamander	Nahuatl	From āxōlōtl, after the god Xolotl ("two stalks"), who transformed into the animal. The specific name derives from Mexico, ultimately from Mēxihco (with many possible etymologies)		
Ayahuasca (Banisteriopsis caapi)	liana	Quechua	From ayawaska, from aya ("spirit, ancestor") + waska ("vine"), via Spanish, so named because it is used to make a psychoactive drink.		
Aymaratherium †	ground sloth	Aymara	From Aymara, an indigenous group in the Andes, and therion, which is Greek for "beast".		
Bixa orellana (achiote)	malvale	Taíno and Nahuatl	The generic name derives from Taíno bixa. The common name is from Nahuatl āchiotl, the name of the plant.		
Black sapote (Diospyros nigra)	persimmon	Nahuatl	The common name derives from tzapotl ("sapote fruit")		
Cabassous	armadillo	Carib	From capacou ("armadillo") via French.		
Cacao tree (Theobroma cacao)	mallow	Various Mesoamerican languages	Via Spanish, from kakaw in Tzeltal, Kʼicheʼ and Classic Maya; kagaw in Sayula Popoluca; and cacahuatl in Nahuatl		
Cacomistle (Bassariscus sumichrasti)	procyonid	Nahuatl	From tlahcomiztli, meaning "half cat" or "half mountain lion"		
California condor (Gymnogyps californianus)	New World vulture	Quechua	The common name derives from kuntur, via Spanish.		
Camas (Camassia)	asparagid	Nez Perce	From qém̓es ("sweet")		
Canihua (Chenopodium pallidicaule)	amaranth	Quechua	From qañiwa / qañawa / qañawi		
Caribou (Rangifer tarandus)	deer	Mi'kmaq	From qalipu ("snow shoveler"), referring to its habit of pawing through the snow for food, via French. Known as reindeer outside North America.		
Cashew (Anacardium occidentale)	cashew	Tupi	From acajú ("nut that produces itself"), via Portuguese		
Cassava, manioc, yuca (Manihot esculenta)	asparagid	Taíno, Tupi, and Guarani	"Cassava" derives from kasabi ("cassava flour"), via Portuguese. "Yuca" was the actual Taíno name for the plant, but Linnaeus mistakenly used the name for the unrelated Yucca plant. Man(d)ioca (manioc) and mandi'o (manihot) are respectively the Tupí and Guaraní names of the plant, both from oca (house) of the mythical figure Man(d)í.		
Cayenne pepper (Capsicum annuum var.)	pepper	Tupi	From kyynha ("pepper"). The town Cayenne is probably named after the plant, not the other way around.		
Caypullisaurus †	ichthyosaur	Mapudungun	From Caypulli ("spirit of Cay") god of the sea in the Mapuche mythology, and saurus ("lizard").		
Celtis iguanaea	hackberry	Taíno	From iguana, ultimately from Taino iwana		
Celtis tala	hackberry	Aymara/Quechua	From tara, the Aymara and Quechua name for various hackberries.		
Chacoan peccary (Catagonus wagneri)	peccary	Quechua	Named after the Gran Chaco plains, ultimately from chaku ("hunting land").		
Chaguar (Bromelia serra, Bromelia hieronymi, Deinacanthon urbanianum and Pseudananas sagenarius)	bromeliad	Quechua	From cháhuar		
Chamitataxus †	badger	Tewa	Named for the Chamita Formation, where the holotype was found, a Spanish diminutive form of tsąmą' ǫŋwįkeyi, meaning "wrestling pueblo-ruin," and Latin taxus ("badger")		
Chayote (Sechium edule)	gourd	Nahuatl	From chayohtli		
Cherimoya (Annona cherimola)	magnolial	Quechua	Common and specific names from chirimuya ("cold seeds"), named for the cold environment in which the seeds germinate.		
Chia (Salvia hispanica and Salvia columbariae)	mint	Nahuatl	From chian ("oily")		
Chigger / harvest mite (Trombiculidae)	mite	Carib	The American common name "chigger" shares its origin with the jigger (a type of flea), deriving from chigoe, ultimately from Galibi Carib siko / chico or, alternatively, from Wolof or Yoruba jiga ("insect")		
Chili pepper (capsicum various species)	pepper	Nahuatl	From chīlli ("pepper")		
Chinchilla	rodent	Quechua	From Quechua chincha ("ocelot"), their exonym for the Chincha people, who once wore its fur.		
Chinook salmon (Oncorhynchus tshawytscha)	salmon	Chinook Jargon	Named after the Chinookan peoples		
Chipmunk (Tamias, Eutamias, Neotamias)	squirrel	Ottawa	From jidmoonh ("red squirrel", literally "those who descend headfirst").		
Choco toucan (Ramphastos brevis)					
Chubutherium †	ground sloth	Tehuelche	Named for the Chubut River, ultimately from Tehuelche chupat ("transparent"), and Greek therium, meaning "beast".		
Chubutisaurus †	titanosaur	Tehuelche	Named for the Chubut River, ultimately from Tehuelche chupat ("transparent"), and Greek saurus, meaning lizard.		
Chubutophis †	boa snake	Tehuelche	Named for the Chubut River, ultimately from Tehuelche chupat ("transparent"), and Greek ophis, meaning snake.		
Chuckwalla (Sauromalus)	iguanid	Shoshone or Cahuilla	The common name derives from Shoshone tcaxxwal or Cahuilla čaxwal, via Spanish		
Chum salmon (Oncorhynchus keta)	salmon	Lower Chinook	The common name derives from tzum ("spotted") via Chinook Jargon.		
Cisco (Coregonus artedi and several other species)	salmon	Ojibwe	From siscowet ("cooks itself"), via French.		
Coati (nasua and nasuella)	procyonid	Tupi	From kua'ti, itself composed of cua ("belt") and tim̃ ("nose"), via Portuguese and Spanish.		
Coca (Erythroxylum)	erythroxylacean	Quechua	From kúka, via Spanish		
Coendou (prehensile-tailed porcupines)	New World porcupine		"a Brazilian native name for the porcupine"		
Cohosh (Actaea and Caulophyllum)	Ranunculal	Penobscot	From kkwὰhas ("rough"), originally referring to Caulophyllum thalictroides		
Comahuesaurus †	diplodocid	Mapudungun	Named for the Comahue region, whose name means 'place of abundance', or perhaps 'where the water hurt', and Greek saurus, meaning lizard.		
Comahuesuchus †	notosuchian crocodylomorph	Mapudungun	Named for the Comahue region, whose name means 'place of abundance', or perhaps 'where the water hurt', and suchus, the Greek name of the Egyptian crocodile god Sobek.		
Comahuetherium †	astrapothere	Mapudungun	Named for the Comahue region, whose name means 'place of abundance', or perhaps 'where the water hurt', and Greek therium, meaning "beast".		
Conepatus chinga (Hog-nosed skunk)	skunk	Nahuatl and Mapudungun	The genus name is most likely from conepatl, the Nahuatl name of the animal, ultimately meaning "burrower". The species name is possibly from Mapudungun chingue ("skunk") or Spanish chinga ("pug-nosed")		
Coontie palm (Zamia integrifolia)	cycad	Muscogee / Creek	From conti hateka ("white root").		
Cougar (puma concolor)	big cat	Quechua and Tupi	The common name is from jaguara ("large predator"), also the root of "jaguar", via French and Portuguese. The generic name is from puma, the Quechua name of the animal		
Coyote (Canis latrans)	dog	Nahuatl	From coyōtl, via Spanish		
Cozumel raccoon (procyon pygmaeus)	procyonid	Yucatec Maya	From Cozumel island, ultimately from Kùutsmil ("island of swallows").		
Ctenomys maulinus (Maule tuco-tuco)	tuco-tuco	Mapudungun	From Laguna del Maule, ultimately from maule ("rainy")		
Ctenomys talarum (Talas tuco-tuco)	tuco-tuco	Quechua	From Las Talas, ultimately from the name of the tala tree		
Ctenomys tucumanus (Tucuman tuco-tuco)	tuco-tuco	Quechua	Named for the Tucumán Province, perhaps from yucumán ("origin of many rivers") or tucma ("the end of things").		
Cullinia †	litoptern	Mapudungun	From cullin, meaning "animal".		
Dicotyles tajacu (Collared peccary)	pig	Tupi	From tai wasu ("big tooth")		
Diospyros texana	persimmon	Caddo	The specific name derives from Texas, ultimately from táyshaʼ ("friend"). The common name "chapote" derives from tzapotl ("sapote fruit", probably originally referring to the black sapote)		
Dowitcher (Limnodromus)	waders	Iroquoian	The exact root is unknown, but it was probably something like Oneida tawístawe ("snipe")		
Eastern wahoo (Euonymus atropurpureus)	stiff-vine	Dakota	From wā ("arrow") and hu ("wood")		
Elaltitan †	titanosaur	Tehuelche	From El-lal, a Tehuelche god, and Greek titan, a mythological race of giants.		
Elemgasem †	abelisaurid	Tehuelche	From Elemgasem, the name of a Tehuelche god.		
Equus alaskae †	horse	Aleut	From Latin equus ("horse") and alaskae "of Alaska," ultimately from Aleut alaxsxaq, meaning "the mainland" or, more literally, "the object towards which the action of the sea is directed".		
Equisetum similkamense †	horsetail	Nicola	From the Similkameen River, itself from Similkameigh, believed to mean "Salmon river."		
Eriocampa tulameenensis †	sawfly	Nlaka'pamuctsin	From the Tulameen River near where the holotype was collected, which itself means "red earth".		
Eulachon (Thaleichthys pacificus)	smelt	Lower Chinook	From uλalxʷen, the name of the fish, via Chinook Jargon. The word may also be the origin of the name Oregon.		
Euneomys chincilloides (Patagonian chinchilla mouse)	rodent	Quechua	From chinchilla, ultimately from Quechua chincha ("ocelot").		
Futalognkosaurus †	titanosaur	Mapudungun	From futa ("giant") and lognko ("chief"), as well as Greek saurus ("lizard").		
Galictis cuja (Lesser grison)	weasel	Mapudungun	From cuja, the Mapudungun name of the animal.		
Gnatusuchus pebasensis †	caiman	Quechua, Peba	From Quechua Ñatu, meaning "small nose," and suchus, the Greek name of the Egyptian crocodile god Sobek. The species name is from the Pebas Formation, where the holotype was collected, which itself derives from the now-extinct Peba language		
Goeppertia allouia (Guinea arrowroot)	arrowroot	Kalinago	The specific name derives from the Kalinago name of the plant.		
Green sapote (Pouteria viridis)	sapotacean	Nahuatl	The common name derives from tzapotl ("sapote fruit", probably originally referring to the black sapote)		
Gualicho shinyae †	allosaurid	Mapudungun	Named after the gualichu, a Mapuche monster		
Guanaco (Lama guanicoe)	camelid	Quechua	From the Quechua name of the animal, wanaku.		
Guarana (Paullinia cupana)	soapberry	Guaraní	From warana ("eyes of the gods"), the name of the plant among the Sateré-Maué, referring to an origin myth, via Portuguese		
Guaruba guarouba (golden parakeet)	parakeet	Tupi	Both generic and specific names come from Guiarubas, meaning "yellow bird"		
Guava (Psidium guajava)	myrtle	Taíno	Common and specific names derive from guayabo via Spanish		
Herrerasaurus ischigualastensis †	saurischian	Cacán	From the Ischigualasto Formation, where the holotype was collected, which itself means "place where the moon alights".		
Hickory (Carya)	walnut family	Algonquian language (perhaps Powhatan)	From pockerchicory, pocohicora, or similar, perhaps a name for the tree's nuts or a drink made from them.		
Hoatzin (Opisthocomus hoazin)	bird	Nahuatl	The common and specific names derive from huāctzin, the name for the unrelated laughing falcon. It is unclear how the name came to be attached to this bird, which is not found within the area where Nahuatl is spoken.		
Holochilus chacarius (Chacoan marsh rat)	rodent	Quechua	Named after the Gran Chaco plains, ultimately from chaku ("hunting land").		
Husky (breeds of Canis familiaris)	dog	Innu-aimun	From ayas̆kimew ("a person who laces a snowshoe"), the Innu exonym for the Mi'kmaq, which is also the root of Eskimo, since these dogs were used by the Mi'kmaq and other Arctic peoples		
Ibirania †	titanosaur	Tupi	From Ibirá, the municipality where the specimens were discovered, and ybyrá, meaning "tree", and ania, a modified form of Greek plania ("wanderer")		
Ilokelesia †	abelisaurid	Mapudungun	From ilo meaning "flesh" and kelesio, "lizard"		
Inkayacu paracasensis †	penguin	Quechua	From inka ("emperor" or "king") and yacu ("water")		
Ipomoea batatas (sweet potato)	bindweed	Taíno	The common and specific names come from batata ("sweet potato") via Spanish.		
Ipomoea batatoides	bindweed	Taíno	The specific name comes from batata ("sweet potato") and the Greek ending -oides ("looks like")		
Ischigualastia †	dicynodont	Cacán	From the Ischigualasto Formation, where the holotype was collected, which itself means "place where the moon alights".		
Jabuticaba (Plinia cauliflora)	myrtle	Tupi	From jaboti/jabuti ("Red-footed tortoise") and caba ("place"), meaning "the place where tortoises are found" or "like turtle fat," referring to the fruit's white pulp.		
Jacamar	near-passerine birds	Tupi	From jacamarciri, the Tupi name for the Great Jacamar.		
Jaguar (panthera onca)	big cat	Tupi	From jaguara ("large predator"), also the root of cougar		
Jaguarundi (Herpailurus yagouaroundi)	big cat	Old Guarani	From yaguarundi ("large predator"), related to the Tupi jaguara, which is the root of cougar and jaguar		
Jakapil kaniukura †	thyreophoran	Puelchean and Mapudungun	Ja-Kapïl, is Puelchean for "shield bearer," the literal meaning of the clade name thyreophora. Kaniukura is Mapudungun for "crest stone", in reference to its deep jaw.		
Jalapeño (Capsicum annuum var.)	pepper	Nahuatl	Jalapeño is Spanish for "from Xalapa", the capital city of Veracruz, Mexico, where the pepper was traditionally cultivated. The name Xalapa is Nahuatl, from xālli ("sand") and āpan ("water place").		
Jícama (Pachyrhizus erosus)	pea	Nahuatl	From xīcamatl via Spanish		
Jigger (Tunga penetrans)	flea	Carib	From chigoe, ultimately from Galibi Carib siko / chico. Alternatively, from Wolof or Yoruba jiga ("insect")		
Juchuysillu †	notoungulate				
Jurubeba (Solanum paniculatum)	nightshade	Tupi	From yuruíbeba		
Kaikaifilu †	mosasaur	Mapudungun	From Kai-Kai filú, a reptilean ocean deity of the Mapuche		
Kaikaifilusaurus †	rhynchocephalia	Mapudungun	From Kai-Kai filú, a reptilean ocean deity of the Mapuche and Greek saurus ("lizard").		
Katepensaurus goicoecheai †	rebbachisaurid	Tehuelche	From katepenk, "hole", referring to a distinctive opening in the transverse processes of the dorsal vertebrae, and Greek saurus ("lizard").		
Kawas benegasorum †	seal	Tehuelche	From kawas ("mermaid" or "southern elephant seal")		
Kelenken †	terror bird	Tehuelche	From the name of a spirit, which is depicted as a giant bird.		
Kelenkura †	glyptodont	Mapudungun	From këlen ("tail") and kura ("rock"), due to the shape of its tail.		
Kelep (Ectatomma tuberculatum)	ant	Qʼeqchiʼ			
Kelumapusaura machi †	hadrosaur	Mapudungun	From kelumapu ("red earth") and Greek saura ("female lizard"). The specific name, "machi," is a Mapudungun word for "shaman."		
Kinkajou (Potos flavus)	procyonid	Algonquian	From kwi·nkwaʔa·ke ("wolverine"), via French.		
Kuntinaru †	armadillo	Aymara	From Kuntinaru ("ghost"), which "refers to the ghost-like isolated occurrence of this taxon and the subsequent 12 Myr absence of the tolypeutines in the fossil record"		
Kurupi itaata †	abelisaurid	Guaraní and Tupi	The genus name derives from Kurupi, a Guaraní god of fertility and sex, because the fossils were found near a love hotel. The specific name is from ita ("hard") and atã ("rock") after the cemented rocks of the Monte Alto region.		
Kyhytysuka sachicarum †	ichthyosaur	Chibcha	The genus name derives from the verb kyhyty and the particle suka, together meaning "the one that cuts with something sharp" because of its unique teeth. The species name derives from the town of Sáchica, near where the holotype was found.		
Lakukullus †	ground sloth	Aymara	From Laku'kullu ("wild animal of heights")		
Leinkupal †	diplodocid	Mapudungun	From lein ("vanishing") and kupal ("family"), because the genus is the latest known diplodocid		
Leufuichthys †	clupeiomorph fish	Mapudungun	From Leufú ("river"), and Greek icthys ("fish").		
Lima bean (Phaseolus lunatus)	bean	Quechua	From Lima, Peru, itself from Limaq ("talker" or "speaker", after an oracle located there before the Spanish conquest)		
Lioptilodes yungas	moth	Aymara / Quechua	From Bolivian Yungas forest, where it was found, ultimately from Aymara and Quechua yunka ("warm region of the Andes")		
Llallawavis †	terror bird	Quechua	From Llallawa ("magnificent") and Latin avis ("bird")		
Llama (Lama glama)	camelid	Quechua	The common name, genus name, and specific name all derive from the Quechua name for the animal, llama		
Llukalkan †	abelisaurid	Mapudungun	llukalkan means "one who scares" or "one who causes fear"		
Llullataruca †	litoptern	Quechua	From llulla ("false", "lie" or "deceitful") and taruca ("deer")		
Lúcuma Pouteria lucuma	sapotacean	Quechua	From rukma / luqma		
Maca (Lepidium meyenii)	brassical	Quechua	From maqa		
macaws (Ara, Anodorhynchus, Cyanopsitta, Primolius, Orthopsittaca, and Diopsittaca)	New World parrots	Tupi	Probably from macavuana, the name of a palm tree which the scarlet macaw fed on, via Portuguese macao.		
Mahuidacursor lipanglef †	ornithopod dinosaur	Mapudungun	From mahuida ("mountain") and Latin cursor ("runner"), because there are many mountains surrounding the area where the holotype was found. The specific name is from lipang ("arm") and lef ("light"), because of its slender forearms.		
Maip †	megaraptor	Tehuelche	From Maip, the name of a mythological spirit that is "the shadow of death" that "kills with cold wind."		.
Maize (Zea mays)	cereal	Taíno	Specific and common name from mahiz		
Mammee (Mammea americana)	calophyllacean	Taíno	The generic name and common name are both from mamey, the name of the plant		
Mamey sapote Pouteria sapota	sapotacean	Taíno and Nahuatl	The generic name and common name are both from Taino mamey, the name of Mammea americana, which produces similar fruit. The specific and common names both derive from Nahuatl tzapotl ("sapote fruit", probably originally referring to the black sapote)		
Manatee (Trichechus)	sea cows	Taíno?	Possibly from manati ("breast"). Alternatively, it may derive from Latin manus ("hand")		
Manilkara chicle	sapotacean	Nahuatl or Mayan	From tzictli or tsicte ("gum," "sticky stuff")		
Manilkara zapota (Sapodilla)	sapotacean	Nahuatl	The specific and common names both derive from tzapotl ("sapote fruit", probably originally referring to the black sapote)		
Mapusaurus †	carcharodontosaurid	Mapuche	From mapu ("earth" or "of the land") and Greek sauros ("lizard")		
Margay (leopardus wiedii)	cat	Guaraní language	From mbarakaya ("cat"), via Portuguese		
Mashua (Tropaeolum tuberosum)	nasturtium	Quechua	From maswa or mashwa, the Quechua name for the plant		
Massasauga (Sistrurus catenatus)	rattlesnake	Ojibwe	From misi-ziibi ("great river", the Mississippi River)		
Mazama (brocket deer)	deer	Nahuatl	From mazame, the plural of mazatl "deer".		
Mazama bororo (small red brocket)	deer	Bororo	Named after the Bororo people		
Mazama chunyi (dwarf brocket)					
Mazama gouazoubira gray brocket	deer	Guarani	The specific name comes from guazú-birá ("small deer"), the name of the animal among the Guarani of Paraguay.		
Mazama temama (Central American red brocket)					
Menhaden (Brevoortia and Ethmidium)	forage fish	Algonquian	A blend of poghaden probably from Abenaki or Penobscot, and an Algonquian word akin to Narragansett munnawhatteaûg, derived from munnohquohteau ("he fertilizes"), referring to their use of the fish as fertilizer.		
Mesquite (Prosopis)	mimosoid	Nahuatl	From mizquitl, via Spanish		
Moose (Alces alces)	deer	Algonquian	From moosu, likely meaning "he strips off," perhaps in reference to the way that they strip bark from trees. In Eurasia, the same species is known as "Elk", which probably derives from the Proto-Germanic language		
Mummichog (Fundulus heteroclitus)	killifish	Narragansett	From moamitteaug ("going in crowds"), reflecting the fishes strong shoaling tendency.		
Muskellunge (Esox masquinongy)	pike	Ojibwe and Algonquin	The common name and the specific name derive from Ojibwe maashkinoozhe ("great fish") or mashkinonge ("big pike" or "ugly pike") and Algoniquin maskinunga, via French		
Muskrat (Ondatra zibethicus)	rodent	Algonquian (possibly Powhatan) or Abenaki and Wyandot	The common name derives from Algonquian muscascus("it is red", due to its colour) or Abenaki mòskwas, with interference from English "musk", referring to its odor. The generic name derives from Wyandot ondathra, the name of the animal, via French.		
Myotis chiloensis	bat	Huilliche	From Chiloé Island, from chilhué ("land of seagulls")		
Neotamandua †	anteater	Tupi	From Latin neo ("new") and the genus tamandua, itself from taa ("ant") and mundeu ("trap")		
Neuquenornis †	enantiornith	Mapudungun	From the Neuquén River, called Nehuenken ("drafty") in Mapudungun, and Greek ornis ("bird")		
Neuquenraptor †	dromaeosaurid	Mapudungun	From the Neuquén River, called Nehuenken ("drafty") in Mapudungun, and Latin raptor ("robber")		
Neuquensaurus †	saltasaurid	Mapudungun	From the Neuquén River, called Nehuenken ("drafty") in Mapudungun, and Greek saurus ("lizard")		
Neuquensuchus †	mesoeucrocodylid	Mapudungun	From the Neuquén River, called Nehuenken ("drafty") in Mapudungun, and suchus, the Greek name of the Egyptian crocodile god Sobek.		
Nhandumirim †	sauropodomorph	Tupi	From Nhandu ("rhea") and mirim ("small")		
Nohochichak xibalbahkah †	ground sloth	Mayan	The generic name comes from Nohoch ("great") and ich'ak ("claw"), a translation of the Greek family name Megalonychidae. The specific name is from Xibalba ("the underworld") and ahkah ("dweller")		
Nopal (Opuntia cochinellifera)	cactus	Nahuatl	From nohpalli, via Spanish		
Nystalus chacuru (white-eared puffbird)	puffbird	Guarani	From chacurú, an imitation of the bird's call.		
Oca (Oxalis tuberosa)	wood sorrel	Quechua	The common name derives from uqa, the Quechua name for the plant, via Spanish		
Ocelot (leopardalis pardalis)	big cat	Nahuatl	From ōcēlōtl ("jaguar"), perhaps influenced by Latin ocellatus ("having little eyes"), in reference to the cat's spotted coat.		
Oligoryzomys chacoensis (Chacoan pygmy rice rat)	rodent	Quechua	Named after the Gran Chaco plains, ultimately from chaku ("hunting land").		
Olingo (Bassaricyon)	procyonid	Uncertain	Edward A. Goldman reported hearing the name from "several native hunters" in Panama in 1920. It is also reported as a native name for the howler monkey in Nicaragua.		
Opossum (Didelphimorphia)	marsupial	Powhatan	From aposoum ("white animal"), from Proto-Algonquian *wa·p-aʔθemwa ("white dog"), originally referring to the Virginia opossum		
Otocinclus bororo (Paraguay dwarf sucker)	armoured catfish	Bororo	Named after the Bororo people		
Oyamel fir (Abies religiosa)	fir	Nahuatl	From oya, "to thresh"; metl, "agave", via Spanish		
Paca (Cuniculus)	rodent	Tupi	From paca, the name of the animal, meaning "awake, alert"		
Pacara earpod tree (Enterolobium contortisiliquum)	mimosa	Quechua	From pacara		
Pacay (Inga feuilleei)	mimosa	Quechua	From pakay		
Pachagnathus †	pterosaur	Aymara	From the pacha ("earth"), referring to the inland environment it inhabited		
Pachyrhizus ahipa (ahipa)	pea	Quechua	The specific and common names derive from ajipa / asipa, the Quechua name for the plant, via Spanish.		
Pampadromaeus †	sauropodomorph	Quechua	From pampa ("plain") and Greek dromaeus ("runner")		
Pampas cat (Leopardus pajeros)	big cat	Quechua	From pampa ("plain"). The species name, pajeros is from "a native name" for the cat.		
Pampas deer (Ozotoceros bezoarticus)	deer	Quechua	From pampa ("plain")		
Pampatherium †	glyptodont	Quechua	From pampa ("plain") and Greek therium ("beast")		
Papaya, paw-paw (Carica papya)	brassical	Taíno	From papáia via Spanish		
Para dog-faced bat (Cynomops paranus)	free-tailed bat	Tupi	From the Pará River, ultimately from Pará ("sea" or "large river")		
Pará rubber tree (Hevea brasiliensis)	spurge	Tupi	From the Pará River, ultimately from Pará ("sea" or "large river")		
Parvinatator wapitiensis †	ichthyosaur	Shawnee/Cree	The specific name is ultimately from waapiti ("elk," literally "white rump")		
Pawpaw (Asimina triloba)	magnolial	Probably Miami-Illinois	The generic name derives from assimin or rassimin, via French. The common name is derived from papaya (see above).		
Pecan (Carya illinoinensis)	hickory	Algonquin and Miami-Illinois	The common name derives from pakani, an Algonquin word variously referring to pecans, walnuts, and hickory nuts, via French. The specific name derives from Illinois, ultimately from irenwe·wa ("he speaks the regular way"), via Ojibwe and French		
Peccary	pig	Tupi	From pé ("path"), caa ("wood"), and ri ("many"), because of the paths through the forest that the animal creates		
Pehuenchesuchus †	sebecosuchid	Mapudungun	Named after the Pehuenche people, whose name means "people of the monkey puzzle tree", and suchus, the Greek name of the Egyptian crocodile god Sobek.		
Pekania pennanti (Fisher)	mustelid	Abenaki	From pekan, its name in Abenaki		
Pelorocephalus ischigualastensis †	temnospondyl	Cacán	From the Ischigualasto Formation, where the holotype was collected, which itself means "place where the moon alights".		
Persimmon (Diospyros)	ebenacean	Powhatan	From pichamins, pushemins, or pasimenan ("dried fruit"), originally connected with Diospyros virginiana		
Peyote (Lophophora williamsii)	cactus	Nahuatl	From peyōtl ("caterpillar cocoon"), from a root peyōni ("to glisten").		
Phyllotis osilae (Bunchgrass leaf-eared mouse)	rodent	Quechua	The specific name derives from Asillu District		
Pichi (Zaedyus pichiy)	armadillo	Mapudungun	From pichi ("small")		
Pilmatueia †	diplodocid		From Pilmatué, where the holotype was found.		
Pinus latahensis †	pine	Nez Perce	From the Latah Formation, incorrectly believed to be the findspot of the holotype, named after Latah Creek ("a place of pines and sestles" or "fish")		
Pipsissewa (Chimaphila umbellata)	heather	Cree or Abenaki	From Cree pipsissewa ("breaks into small pieces", referring to a medicinal use) or Abenaki kpipskwáhsawe ("flower of the woods")		
Pitaya (Stenocereus and Selenicereus)	cactus	Taíno			
Pitekunsaurus †	titanosaur	Mapudungun	From pitekun ("to discover") and Greek saurus ("lizard")		
Pokeweed (Phytolacca americana)	phytolaccacean	Powhatan	From pocan and English "berry"		
Scup (Sparidae , porgy)	ray-finned fish	Narragansett	From mishcùppaûog ("porgies").		
Possum (Phalangeriformes)	marsupial	Powhatan	Named for its perceived similarity to the opossum, whose name derives from aposoum ("white animal"), from Proto-Algonquian *wa·p-aʔθemwa ("white dog"), originally referring to the Virginia opossum		
Potato (Solanum tuberosum)	nightshade	Taíno / Quechua	From Spanish patata, a hybrid of batata ("sweet potato") and papa ("potato")		
Protojuniperoxylon ischigualastianus †	conifer	Cacán	From the Ischigualasto Formation, where the holotype was collected, which itself means "place where the moon alights".		
Pseudananas	bromeliad	Tupi	The generic name derives from nanas ("pineapple") and Greek pseudos ("false").		
Pseudochampsa ischigualastensis †	proterochampsid	Cacán	From the Ischigualasto Formation, where the holotype was collected, which itself means "place where the moon alights".		
Pudu mephistophiles (Northern pudu)					
Pudu puda (Southern Pudu)					
Punatherium					
Puya	bromeliad	Mapudungun	From puya ("point")		
Quahog, hard clam (Mercenaria mercenaria)	clam	Algonquian language (probably Narragansett)	From poquaûhock or a cognate, the Algonquian name for the clam.		
Quetzal (Pharomachrus and Euptilotis neoxenus)	trogon	Nahuatl	From quetzalli ("large brilliant tail feather"), from the root quetz ("stand up"), via Spanish, originally referring specifically to the resplendent quetzal		
Quinoa (Chenopodium quinoa)	amaranth	Quechua	From kinwa / kinuwa		
Raccoon (procyon lotor)	procyonid	Powhatan	From aroughcun, arathkone, from Proto-Algonquian *ahrah-koon-em("one who rubs, scrubs and scratches with its hands").		
Ramphastos toco (Toco toucan)	toucan	Guarani	Toco derives from tucá or tucán, the Guarani word for a toucan, perhaps meaning "bone-nose". A doublet of toucan.		
Salal (Gaultheria shallon)	heather	Lower Chinook	From sálal (the local name for the plant), via Chinook Jargon.		
Saskatoon berry (Amelanchier alnifolia)	pome	Cree	From misaaskwatoomin ("saskatoon berry"). The town of Saskatoon is named after the plant.		
Scup (Stenotomus chrysops)	porgy	Narragansett	From mishcùp ("porgy"). The plural mishcùppaûog is the source of "porgy".		
Sequoioideae (sequoia, redwood)	conifers	Probably Cherokee	Probably named in honour of Sequoyah, the inventor of the Cherokee syllabary.		
Shastasaurus †	ichthyosaur				
Shonisaurus †	ichthyosaur				
Skunk (Mephitidae)	musteloid	Algonquian (probably Abenaki)	Probably from seganku, ultimately from Proto-Algonquian *šeka:kwa, from *šek- ("urinate") and *-a:kw ("fox")		
Solanum quitoense (naranjilla or lulo)	nightshade	Quechua	The specific name comes from Quito, from Kitu. Lulo is the Quechua name of the plant.		
Squash (Cucurbita)	gourd	Narragansett	From askutasquash ("eaten raw"), from askut ("green, raw") and asquash ("eaten")		
South American sapote / chupa-chupa (Quararibea cordata)	mallow	Nahuatl	The common name derives from tzapotl ("sapote fruit", probably originally referring to the black sapote)		
Tabasco pepper (Capsicum frutescens)	capsicum	Uncertain	From Tabasco State, whose name might derive from Nahuatl or Mayan		
Talenkauen					
Tamandua	anteater	Tupi	From Taa ("ant") and mundeu ("trap")		
Tamarack or hackmatack (Larix laricina)	larch	Algonquian	The exact roots are not known.		
Tapirus	tapirs	Tupi	From tapi'ira, the Old Tupi name for Tapirus terrestris		
Taruca					
Tayassu pecari (White-lipped peccary)	pig	Tupi	From tai wasu ("big tooth"), a Tupi name for the animal. The specific name is another Tupi name for the animal, from pé ("path"), caa ("wood"), and ri ("many"), because of the paths through the forest that the animal creates.		
Tayra (Eira barbara)	weasel	Tupi and Guarani	The common name is from the Tupi name of the animal, eîrara, via Spanish or Portuguese, while the generic name is from the (related) Guarani name of the animal, eira.		
Tehuelchesaurus †	sauropod		Named in honor of the Tehuelche people		
Tepary bean (Phaseolus acutifolius)	bean	Uncertain	Perhaps from Tohono O'odham tʼpawi ("It's a bean") The name for a small bean was recorded in the 17th century, in the now extinct Eudeve language of northern Mexico, as tépar (accusative case, tépari).		
Terrapin (various in Testudines)	turtle	Algonquian	From torope ("diamondback terrapin"), subsequently generalised.		
Teushentherium †	Notohippid notoungulate		Named in honor of the Teushen language.		
Tobacco (Nicotiana)	nightshade	Taíno?	From Spanish tabaco, perhaps from a Taíno word meaning "bundle of tobacco leaves" or "L-shaped pipe for smoking tobacco."		
Tomatillo (Physalis philadelphica and Physalis ixocarpa)	nightshade	Nahuatl	From tomatl ("swelling" / "fat") via Spanish		
Tomato (Solanum lycopersicum)	nightshade	Nahuatl	From tomatl ("swelling" / "fat") via Spanish		
Tonnicinctus †					
Torontoceros					
Toucan barbet (Semnornis ramphastinus)					
Traukutitan †	sauropod				
Tucumán amazon (Amazona tucumana)	parrot	Quechua	Named for the Tucumán Province, perhaps from yucumán ("origin of many rivers") or tucma ("the end of things").		
Tuckahoe (Peltandra virginica)	arum	Powhatan	From tockawhoughe, the name of the edible root of the plant		.
Tupelo (Nyssa)	cornal	Muscogee	From ito ("tree") and opilwa ("swamp")		
Ubirajara jubatus †			The paper describing the holotype specimen was withdrawn in 2021, rendering this name a nomen nudum.		
Ullucus (Ulluco)	caryophyllal	Quechua	From ulluku, milluku ("Ullucus tuberosus")		
Ulmus okanaganensis					
Unenlagia					
Urumacotherium					
Vicuña (Lama vicugna)					
Vilca (Anadenanthera colubrina)	mimosa	Quechua	From willka ("sacred")		
Viscacha (Lagidium and Lagostimus)	rodent	Quechua	From wisk'acha, via Spanish		
Wahoo (Acanthocybium solandri)	scombrid				
Wahoo (Ulmus alata)	elm	Muscogee	From uhawhu		
Wapiti (Cervus canadensis)					
White sapote (Casimiroa edulis)	citrus	Nahuatl	The common name derives from tzapotl ("sapote fruit", probably originally referring to the black sapote)		
Willinakaqe †					
Wokas (Nuphar polysepala)	water-lily	Klamath-Modoc	From wokas, the Klamath name for the plant's seeds		
Woodchuck / groundhog (Marmota monax)	marmot	Algonquian (possibly Narragansett)	From wuchak ("fisher", misapplied)		
Xibalbaonyx †					
Yacarerani †					
Yacón (Smallanthus sonchifolius)	daisy	Quechua	From yacón, the Quechua name of the plant		
Yelaphomte †	pterosaur	Allentiac	From yelap ("beast") and homtec ("air"), referring to the pneumatic skeleton and the flight capabilities of pterosaurs		
Yerba mate (Ilex paraguariensis)	holly	Quechua and Guarani	From Spanish hierba ("herb"), a translation of the Guarani name ka'a and Quechua mati ("gourd", "cup"). The specific name refers to Paraguay, from Guarani paraguá ("feather crown") and y ("water").		
Yopo (Anadenanthera peregrina)	mimosa	Quechua			
Ypupiara					
Yucca	asparagid	Taíno	From yuca, the name of the cassava, with which it was confused by Linnaeus		
Yukon Wild Horse (Equus lambei)					
Yungavolucris	enantiornithine bird	Aymara/Quechua	From the Yungas forest, where it was found, ultimately from Aymara and Quechua yunka ("warm region of the Andes") and Latin volucris ("flyer")		
Yuruatherium					
Zaedyus pichiy (pichi)					
Zephyranthes atamasca (rain lily, atamasco-lily)	amaryllid	Powhatan?	Possibly from attamusca, the Powhatan name for the plant.		
Zupaysaurus					
