= Sapote oil =

Extracted from the seeds of Pouteria sapota

Sapote oil, also known as sapuyul or sapayulo oil, is pressed from the seeds of the mamey sapote (Pouteria sapota), a fruit tree native to Mexico and Central America. The oil is described as having an "almond-like odor" and a "mild, pleasant taste", and is also used as a cooking oil in some tropical countries.

The seeds themselves are reported to be toxic. The seed oil has been used in soaps and cosmetics, as a base for some aromatherapy compounds and as a sedative, skin tonic and hair revitalizer.
