= Sapote =

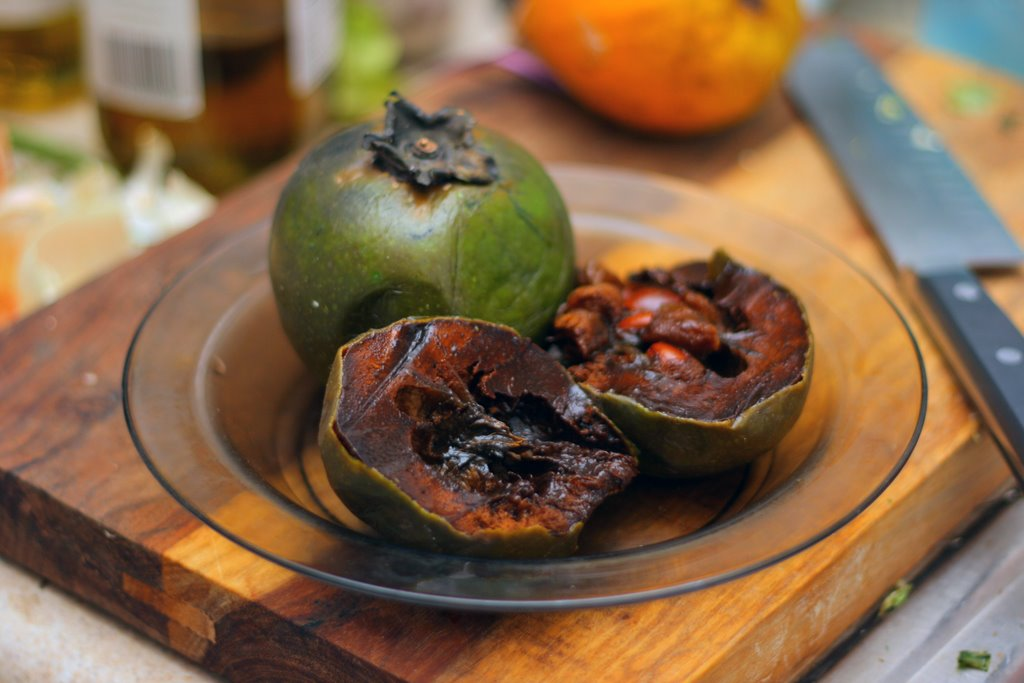
- Black sapote
- Type: Fruit
- Region or state: Mexico, Central America and northern parts of South America

Sapote or zapote (/səˈpoʊtiː, -eɪ, -ə/; from Nahuatl: tzapotl) is a term for a soft, edible fruit. The word is incorporated into the common names of several unrelated fruit-bearing plants native to Mexico, Central America and northern parts of South America.

== Species ==
=== From Sapotaceae ===
Some, but not all sapotes, come from the family Sapotaceae:

- Sapodilla, also called naseberry (Manilkara zapota) is native to Mexico, Guatemala, Nicaragua, Belize, and possibly El Salvador. The Sapotaceae were named after a synonym of this species.
- Yellow sapote (Lucuma campechiana) is native to Mexico and Central America.
- Mamey sapote (Pouteria sapota) is from southern Mexico to northern South America.
- Green sapote (Pouteria viridis) is native to lowland southern Mexico.
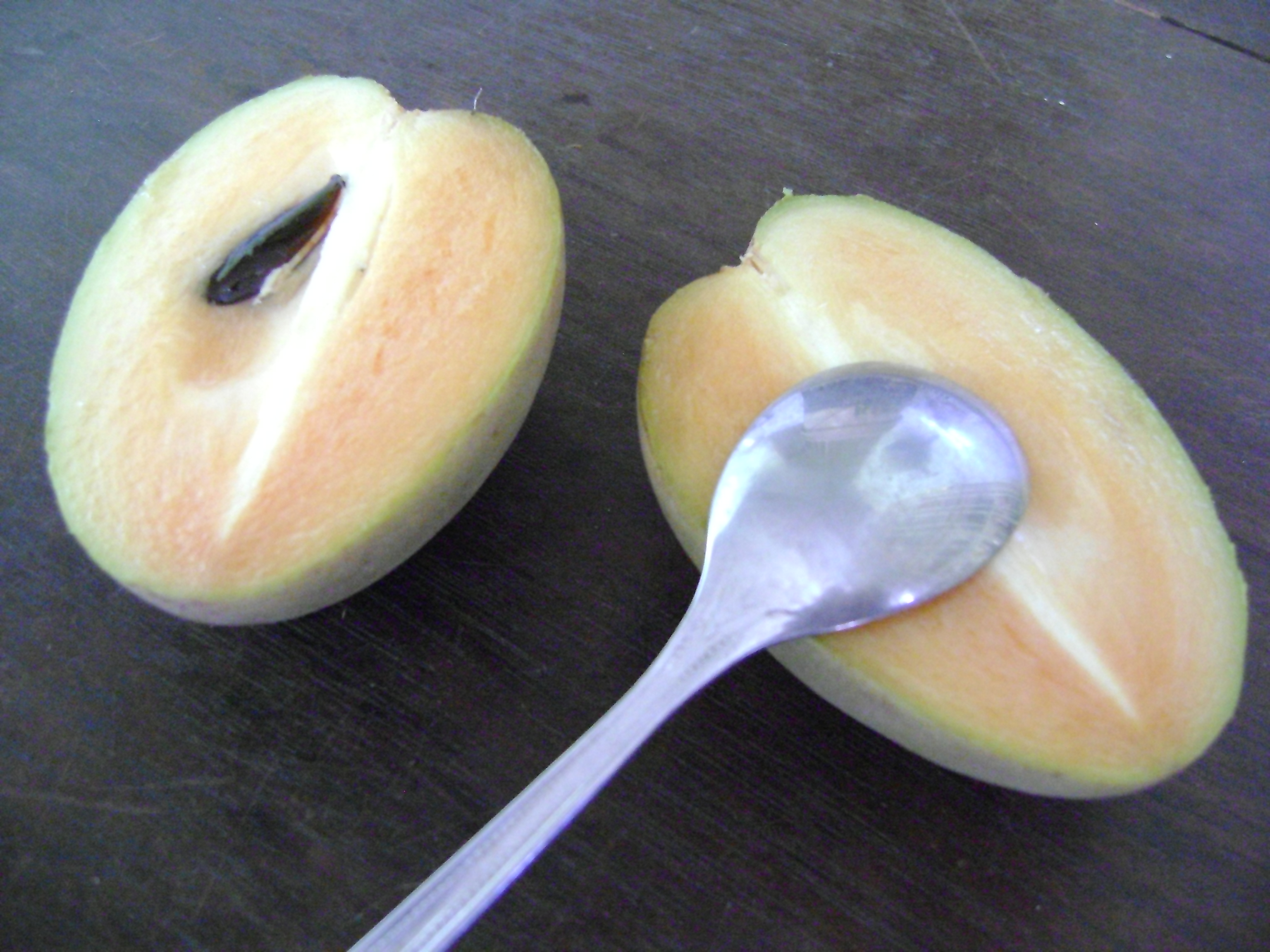
Manilkara zapota, Hồng xiêm, a kind of Vietnamese sapote

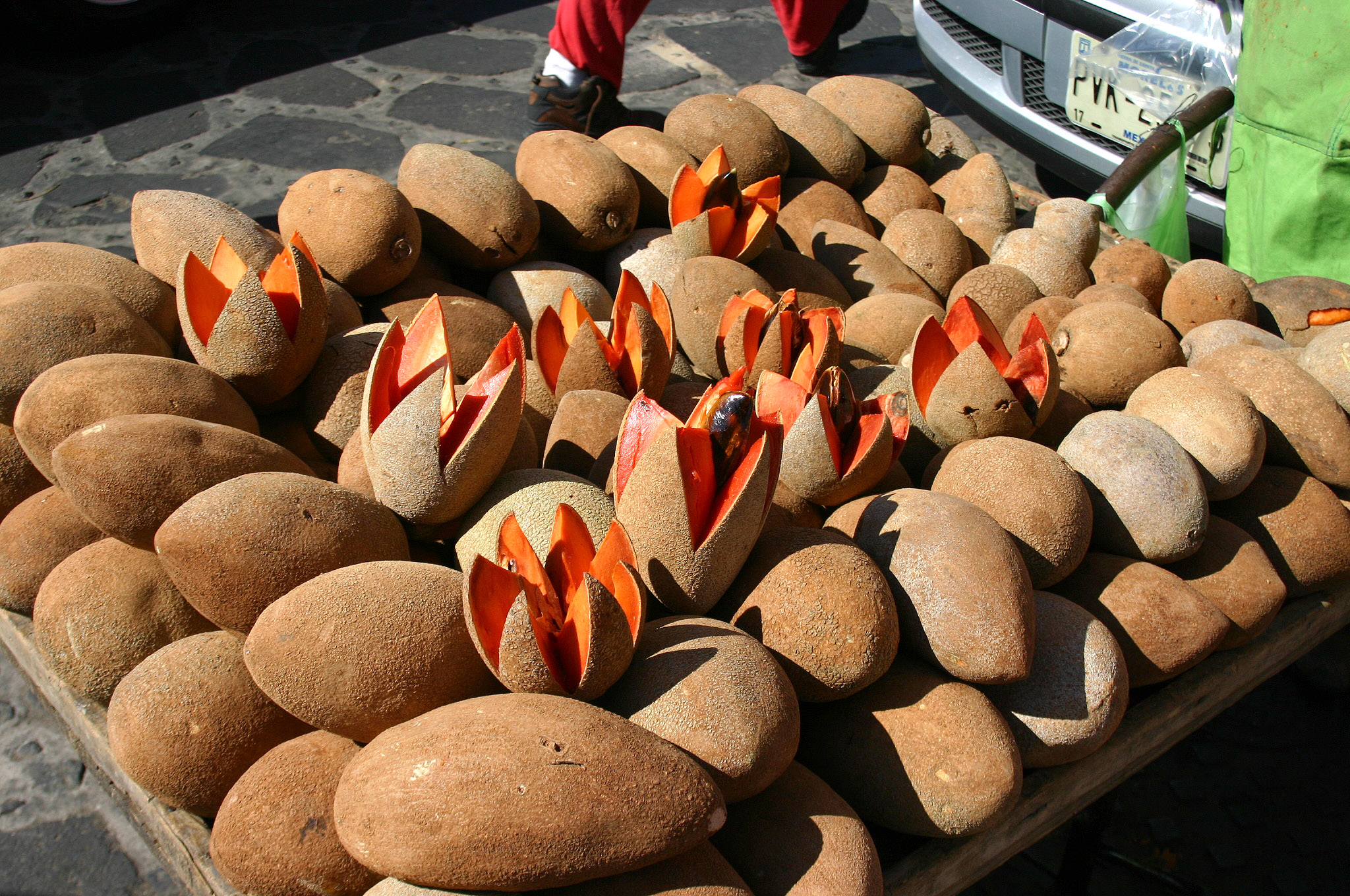
Pouteria sapota, mamey sapote

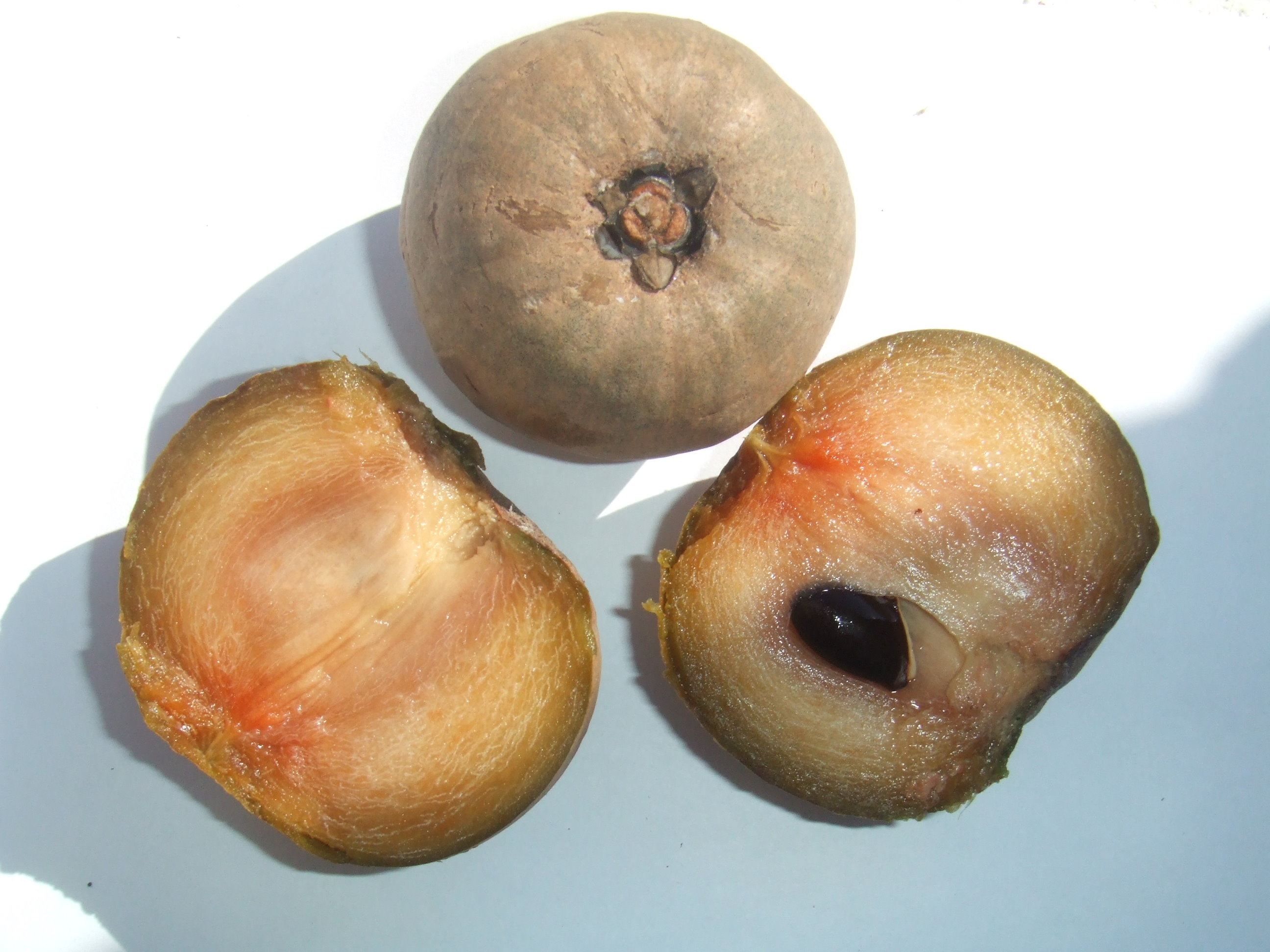
Manilkara zapota, sapodilla

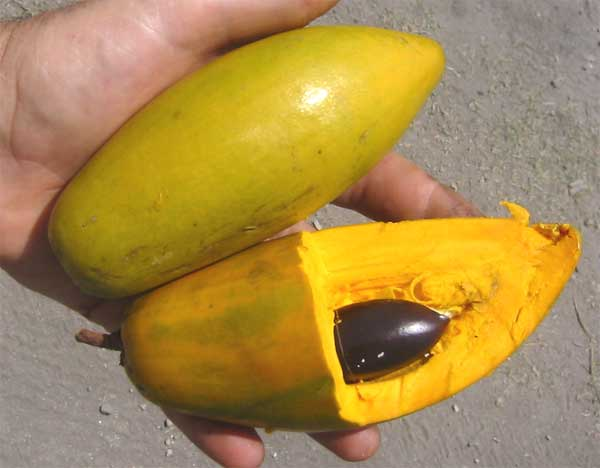
Lucuma campechiana, yellow sapote

=== From other families ===
- Black sapote (Diospyros nigra: Ebenaceae), from eastern Mexico south to Colombia, is probably the original Aztec tzapotl.
- White sapote (Casimiroa edulis: Rutaceae) is native to northern and central Mexico, Costa Rica, El Salvador and Guatemala.
- South American sapote (Quararibea cordata: Malvaceae) is native to the Amazon rainforests of Brazil, Venezuela, Colombia, Ecuador, and Peru.
- Sun sapote (Moquilea platypus: Chrysobalanaceae) is native to southern Mexico south to Colombia.
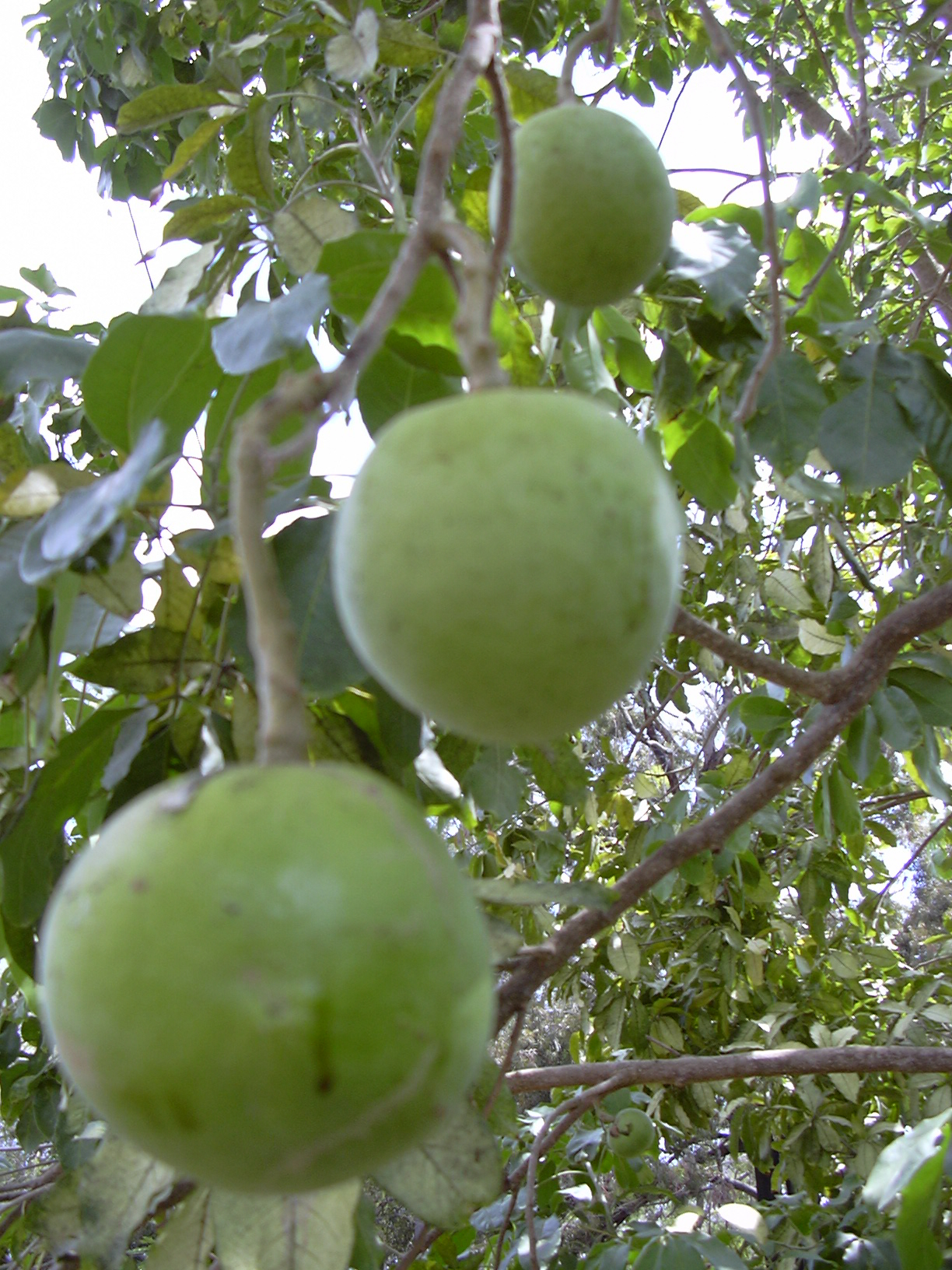
Casimiroa edulis, white sapote

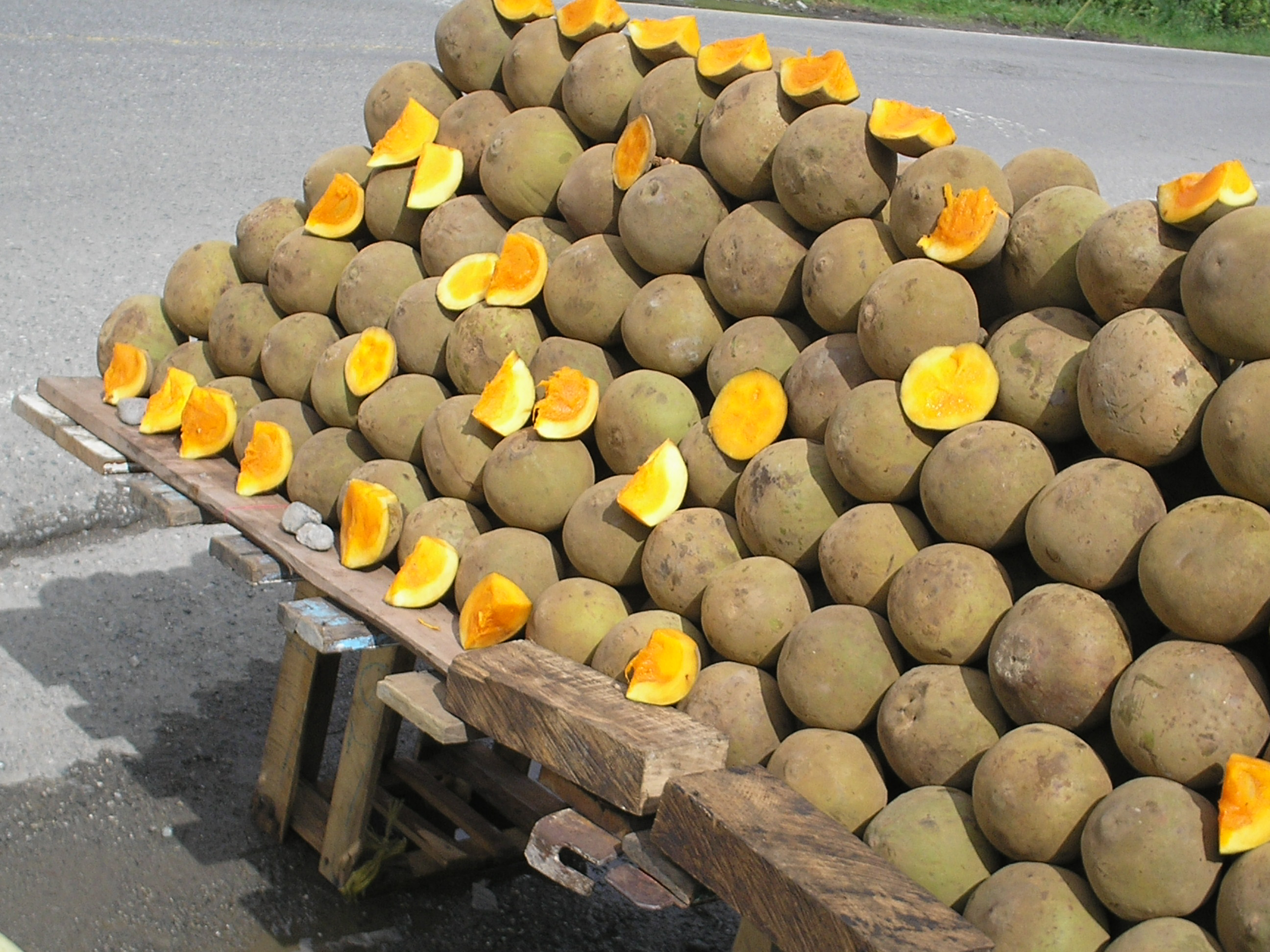
Quararibea cordata, South American sapote

== See also ==
- Chapote (Diospyros texana: Ebenaceae) is native to the lower Rio Grande valley region in Texas and Mexico
