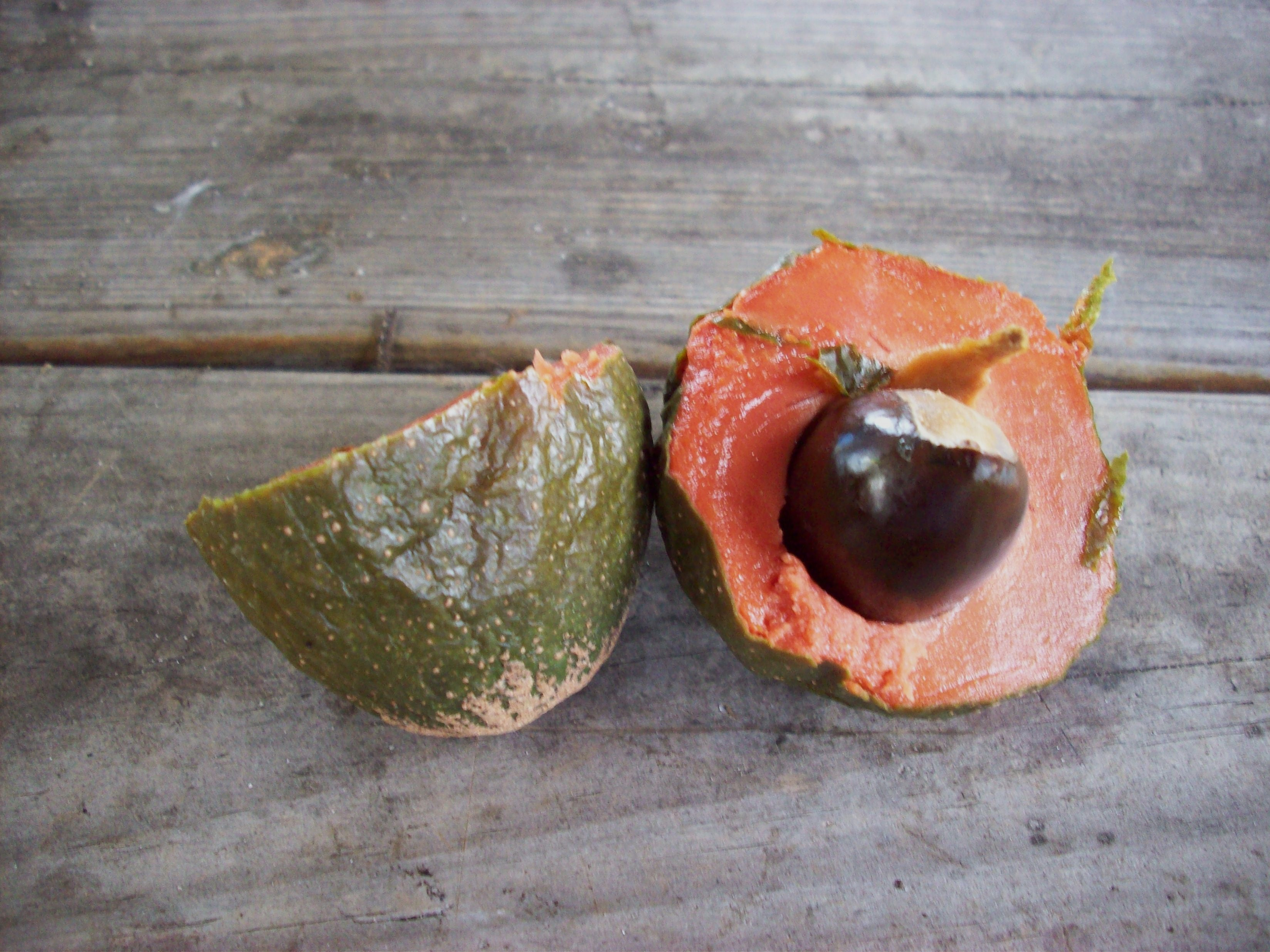

Scientific classification
- Kingdom: Plantae
- Clade: Tracheophytes
- Clade: Angiosperms
- Clade: Eudicots
- Clade: Asterids
- Order: Ericales
- Family: Sapotaceae
- Genus: Pouteria
- Species: P. viridis

Binomial name
- Pouteria viridis (Pittier) Cronquist

Synonyms
- Achradelpha viridis Calocarpum viride

= Pouteria viridis =

Species of flowering plant

Pouteria viridis is a species of flowering plant in the family Sapotaceae known by the common name green sapote.

Other common names include red faisan, white faisan (Belize), zapote blanco, zapote rojo, zapote de castilla, zapote de montana (Costa Rica), zapote verde, zapote injerto (Costa Rica, El Salvador, Honduras), injerto verde (Guatemala), zapotillo calenturiento (Honduras), zapote amarillo, zapote mico, zapote real (Nicaragua), chulul (Mexico), yashtul, mameicito (Spanish), chul (Mam), ixulul (Jacalteco), raxtulul (Poqomchiʼ), tulul (Tz’utujil), and sapota zalená (Czech).

== Distribution and habitat ==
This species is native to Mexico and Central America. Its natural habitat includes tropical forests. It occurs at higher altitudes in cool, moist regions, and it does not tolerate hot or cold conditions.

== Description ==
This plant is a tree usually growing 12 to 24 meters tall, but known to reach 40 meters. It is deciduous or evergreen. The young branches are coated in brown hairs. The leaves are borne in clusters at the ends of flowering branches and alternately arranged on non-flowering branches. They are somewhat lance-shaped with smooth edges, and measure up to 25 centimeters long by 7 wide. The undersides are hairy to woolly. The inflorescence is a fascicle of 2 to 5 flowers. The flower is tubular, about a centimeter long, and whitish or pinkish in color. The fruit is up to 12.5 centimeters long by 8 wide. It has a green or yellow rind, sometimes tinged reddish brown, and a brownish orange or salmon-colored flesh. The fruit contains one or two large, shiny brown seeds, each up to 5 centimeters long.

== Uses ==
The fruit is an edible sapote. The flesh is sweet and juicy. The moisture content is 68 to 70%. It can be eaten raw or made into desserts, drinks, and preserves. The seeds are edible, as well, and can be served roasted. The latex of the tree can be made into chewing gum.

Parts of the plant have traditional medicinal uses. The seed oil is applied to the hair to prevent hair loss. Bark extracts have been used for skin conditions, and the latex has been applied to the skin to treat warts and fungal infections.

The bark reportedly has antitermite properties.

The strong, reddish wood of the tree has occasionally been used for construction and to make furniture and tools.

The species is planted in reforestation efforts and for erosion control.

== Cultivation ==
The plant is usually grown from seed. It can also be propagated by grafting it onto the mamey sapote (Pouteria sapota). Grafting allows the grower to expect a crop much sooner than starting from seed. There is a very small commercial trade in green sapote, but it is more often found in the home garden or small farm.
