= Cohosh =

Cohosh is a common name in the English language for several loosely related woodland herbs. The name may derive from Algonquian (Eastern Abenaki / Penobscot) '*kkwὰhas', meaning 'rough', possibly describing leaves or compound flowers.

It may refer to:

- Black cohosh, Actaea racemosa (Ranunculaceae)
- Blue cohosh, Caulophyllum thalictroides (Berberidaceae)
- Red cohosh, Actaea rubra (Ranunculaceae)
- White cohosh, Actaea pachypoda (Ranunculaceae)
