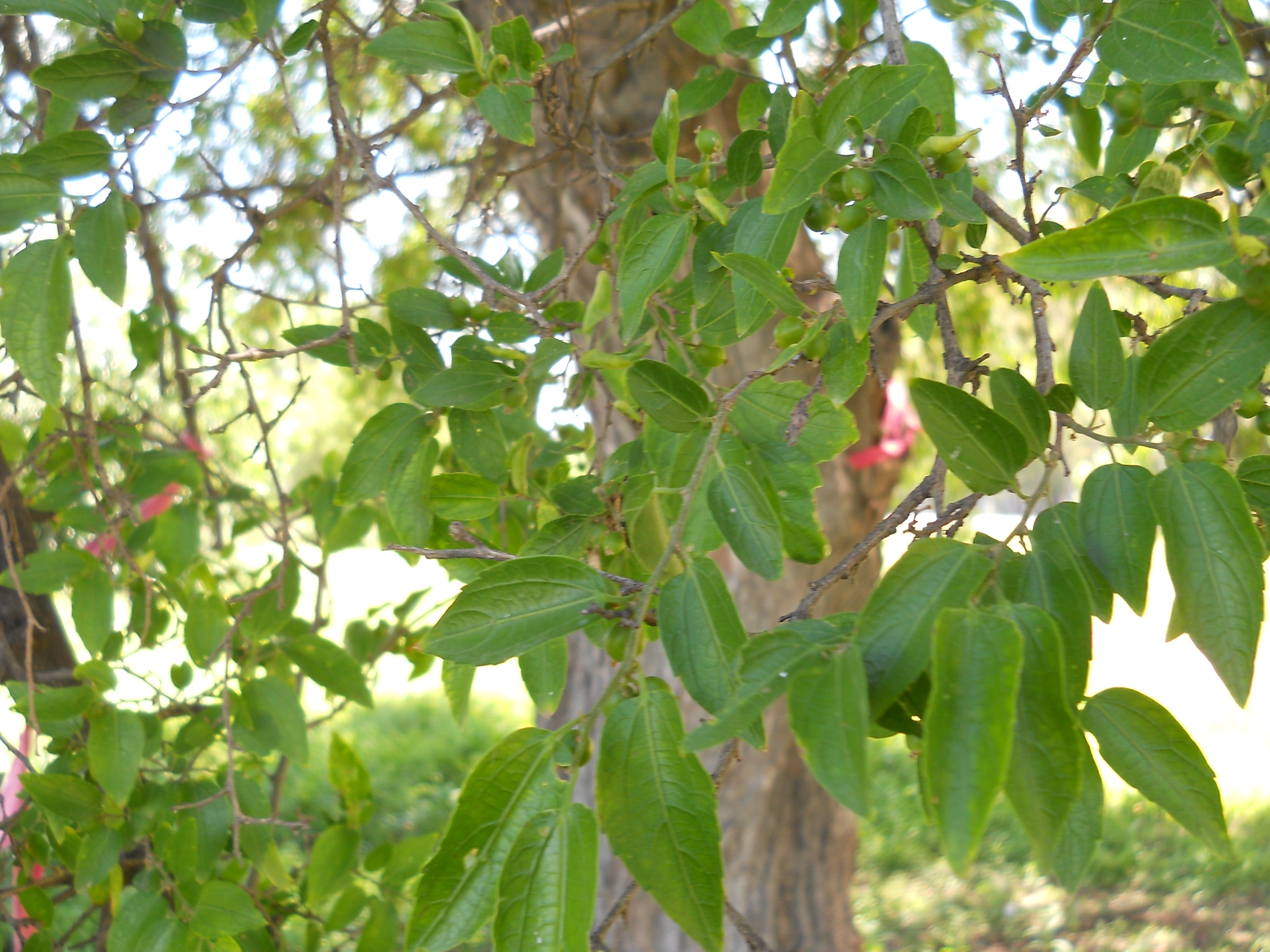
- Leaves of Celtis tala

Conservation status
- Least Concern (IUCN 3.1)

Scientific classification
- Kingdom: Plantae
- Clade: Embryophytes
- Clade: Tracheophytes
- Clade: Angiosperms
- Clade: Eudicots
- Clade: Rosids
- Order: Rosales
- Family: Cannabaceae
- Genus: Celtis
- Species: C. tala

Binomial name
- Celtis tala Gillet ex Planch.

Synonyms
- Celtis cinerea Torr.; Celtis sellowiana Miq.; Celtis spinosa var. weddelliana (Planch.) Baehni; Celtis tala var. gilliesiana Planch.; Celtis tala var. sellowiana (Miq.) Kuntze; Celtis tala var. weddelliana Planch.; Celtis weddelliana (Planch.) Romanczuk; Mertensia tala Wedd. ex Planch.; Mertensia texana Trécul ex Planch.; Momisia integrifolia Wedd.

= Celtis tala =

Tala

Species of tree

Celtis tala, known as tala, is a medium size deciduous tree, native to tropical and subtropical South America. With small to medium-sized spines, its one of the main components of the Gran Chaco prairies and certain areas of the Argentinian pampa.

== Morphology ==
The tala is a medium to large sized tree, sometimes reaching 12m high. According to water availability it may become arboreus or shrubby. It prefers dry or slightly moist, well drained soil. When arboreus the trunk is rather tortuous, nearing 40 cm in diameter. When shrubby, it produces several branched trunks of 20 cm in diameter. Its bark is light colored, gray to brown. The Tala tends to branch abundantly, producing a dense mesh of branches in zigzag patterns, with strong spines in the foliar axis, 1,5 or more, cm long.

The leaves are alternate, petiolate and simple, their base rounded and the margin serrated in the apical region. Leaves are trinervate, acuminate, of a dark green colour. This tree flowers in spring, producing inconspicuous yellowish pentamerous flowers. Since it presents hermaphrodite flowers, it is self-fertile. Tala fruit is a small drupe, 1 cm wide that hangs in short clusters. Not very fleshy and with a proportionally large seed within, it is however very sweet and pleasant to the taste.

== Usage ==
Though edible by humans there is no market or habit of consumption, and these fruits are mostly eaten by birds and several insect species. It is appreciated by wood workers since its wood is tough and rather heavy. It produces excellent wood fuel. The tala has a rather small trunk, which can only be used for small carved objects. It is used for the handles of hand tools and for small crafts.
