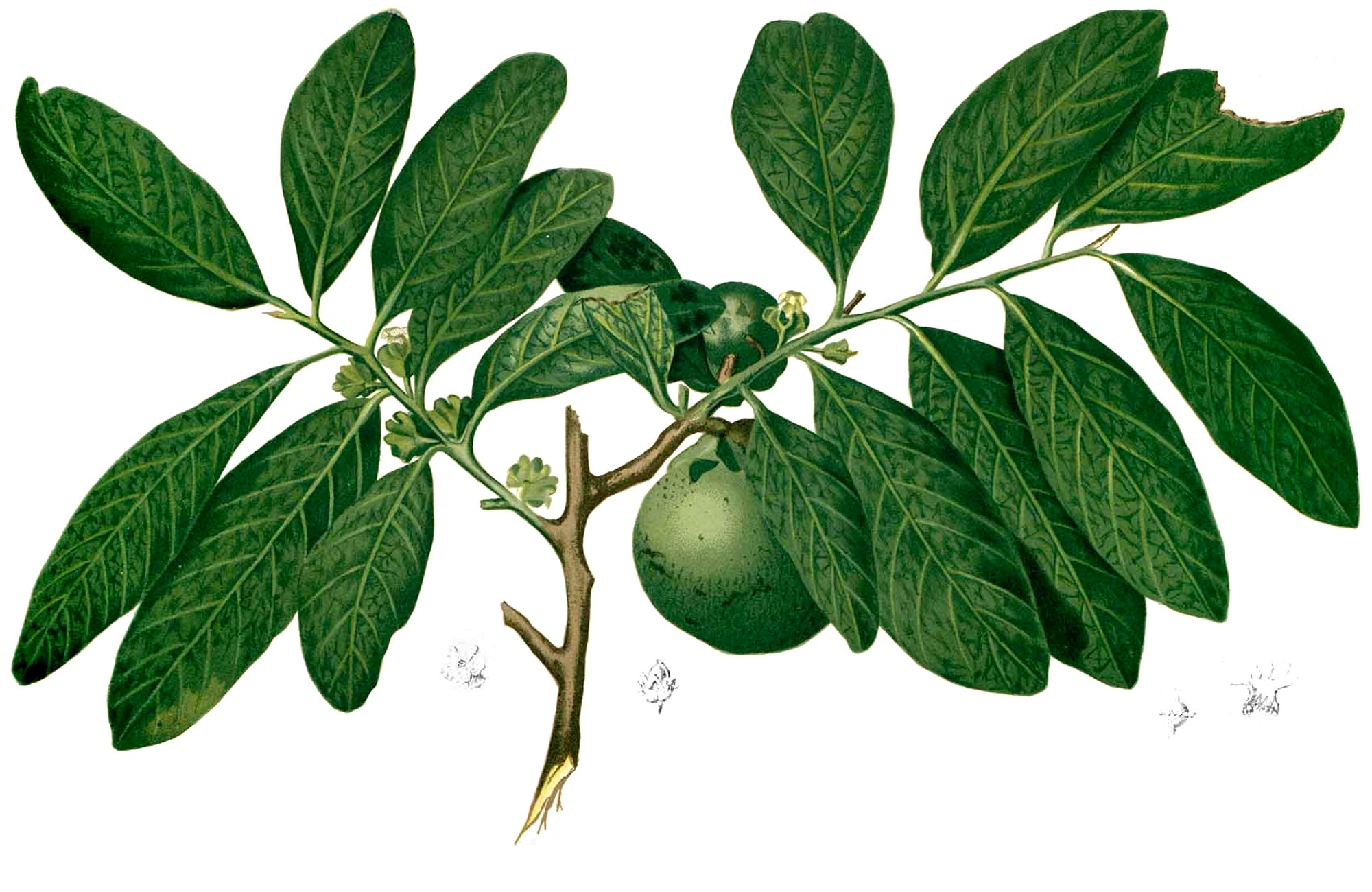

Conservation status
- Least Concern (IUCN 3.1)

Scientific classification
- Kingdom: Plantae
- Clade: Embryophytes
- Clade: Tracheophytes
- Clade: Spermatophytes
- Clade: Angiosperms
- Clade: Eudicots
- Clade: Asterids
- Order: Ericales
- Family: Ebenaceae
- Genus: Diospyros
- Species: D. nigra

Binomial name
- Diospyros nigra (J.F.Gmel.) Perr. (1825)

Synonyms
- List: Diospyros digyna Jacq. (1798); Diospyros edulis Lodd. ex Sweet (1826); Diospyros obtusifolia Humb. & Bonpl. ex Willd. (1806); Diospyros obtusifolia Kunth (1819); Diospyros pauciflora C.B.Rob. (1819); Diospyros sapota Roxb. (1814) nom illeg.; Diospyros sapotanigera DC. (1804); Diospyros tliltzapotl Sessé & Moc. (1890); Sapota nigra J.F.Gmel. (1791)

= Diospyros nigra =

Species of tree

Diospyros nigra, the black sapote, is a species of persimmon. Common names include chocolate pudding fruit, black soapapple and (in Spanish) zapote prieto. The tropical fruit tree is native to Mexico, Central America, and Colombia. The common name sapote refers to any soft, edible fruit. Black sapote is not related to white sapote and is only distantly related to mamey sapote. The genus Diospyros has numerous other fruit bearing tree species in addition to the persimmons and black sapote. It is said to taste like chocolate pudding.

== Etymology ==
The etymology of Diospyros is "divine fruit". It derives from the greek words "dios" and "pyron". This term, translated from Greek, can be variously rendered as "God's pear", "Wheat of Zeus" and "Jove's fire".

== Description ==
Mature trees can grow to over 25 m (82 ft) in height and are evergreen. It is frost sensitive but can tolerate light frosts. The leaves are elliptic-oblong, tapered at both ends, dark green, glossy and 10–30 cm (3.9–11.8 in) long. Some trees bear only male flowers. Others have both male and female flowers, though some of these are self-incompatible. Fruiting takes about 3–4 years from seed and the trees are heavy bearers.

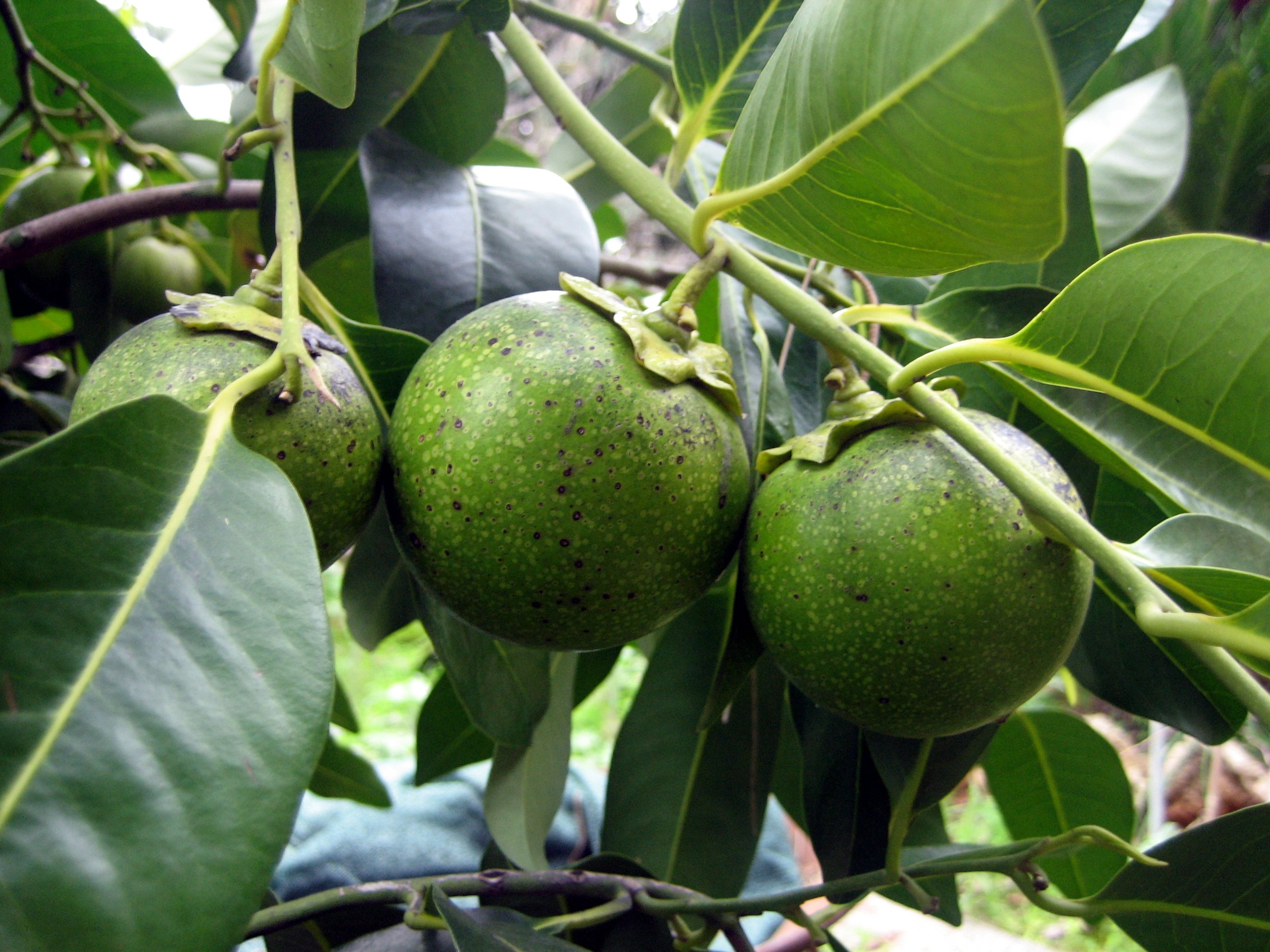

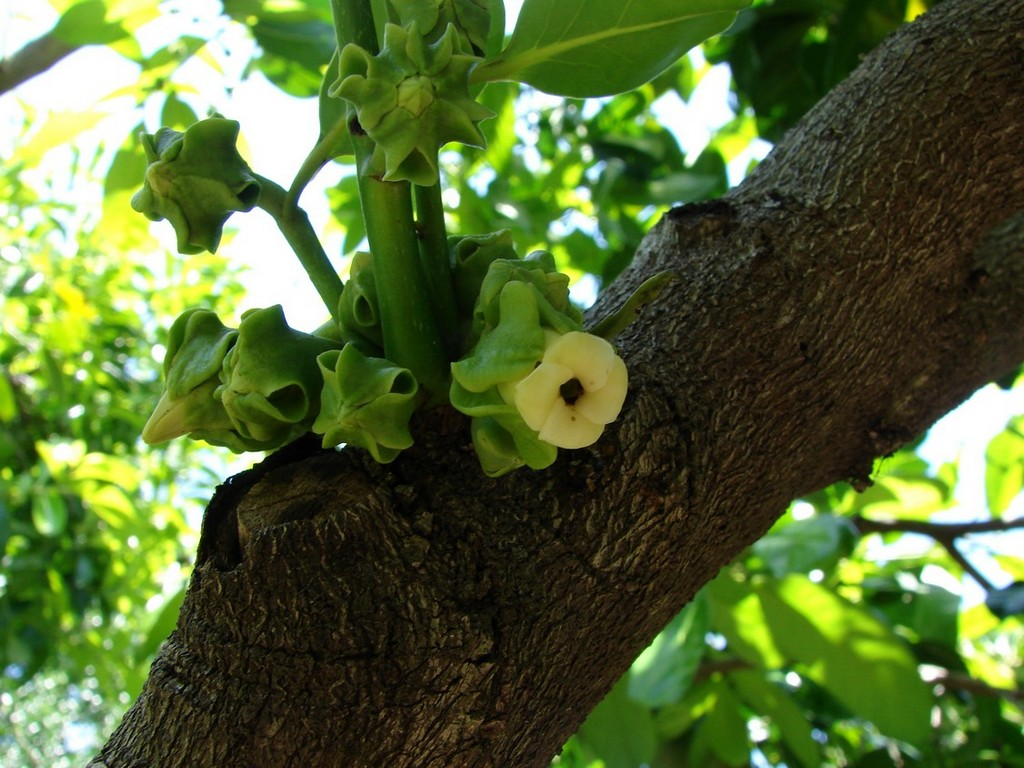

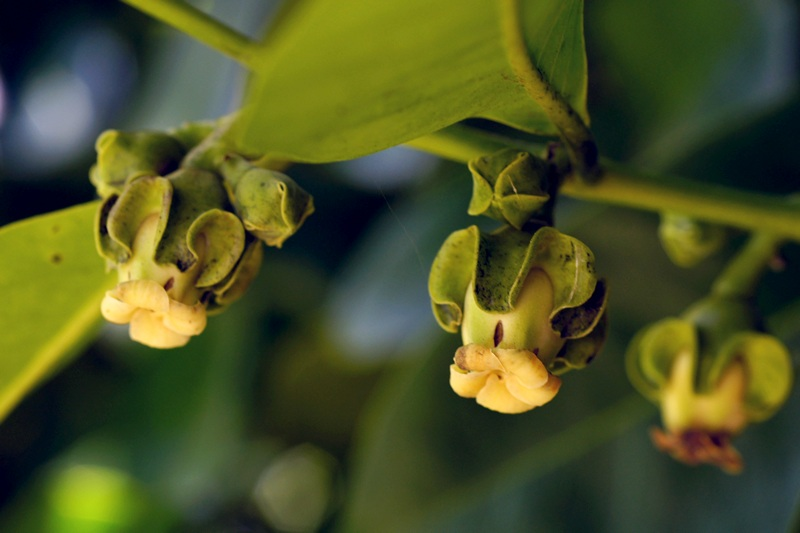

== Fruit ==
Black sapote fruit are tomato-like and measure 5–10 cm (2.0–3.9 in) in diameter, with an inedible skin that turns from olive to a deep yellow-green when ripe and a pulp which is white and inedible when unripe but assumes a flavor, color and texture often likened to chocolate pudding when ripe. Fruits usually contain seeds, up to a maximum of 12. The texture has been likened to that of a papaya. The ripe fruit may have "the taste and consistency of chocolate pudding."

Unripe fruits are astringent, caustic, bitter, irritating, and have been used as fish poison in the Philippines.

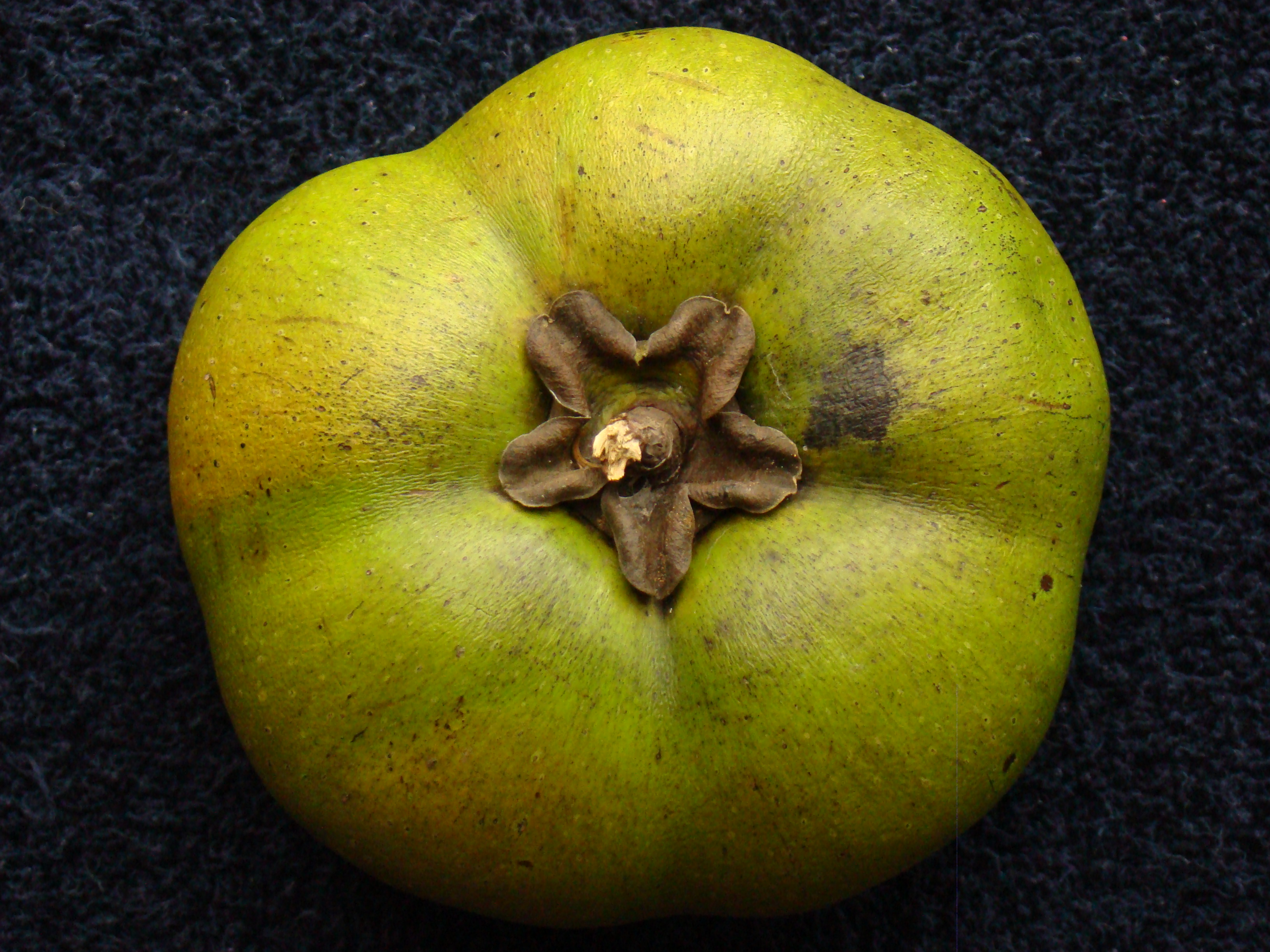

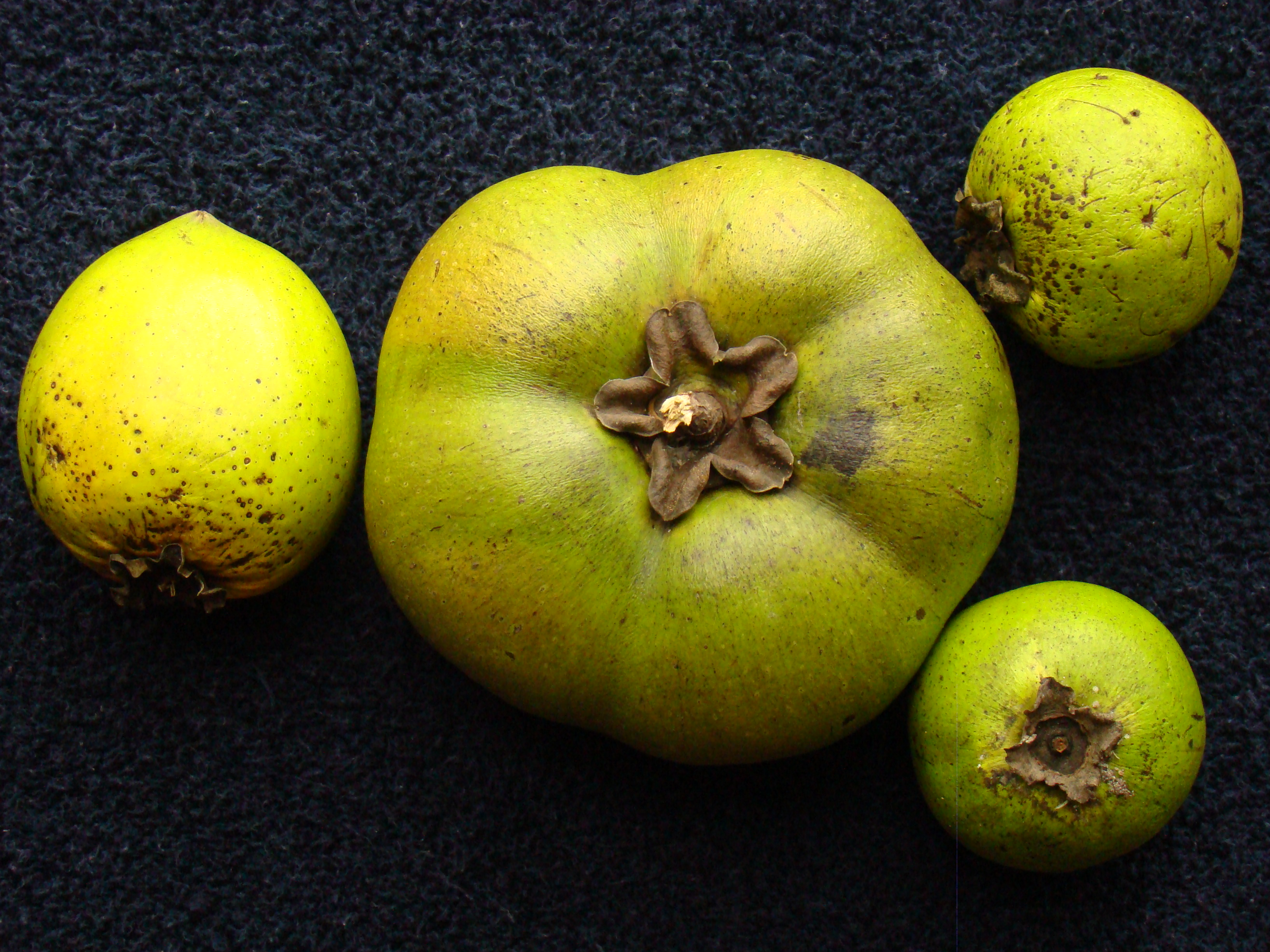

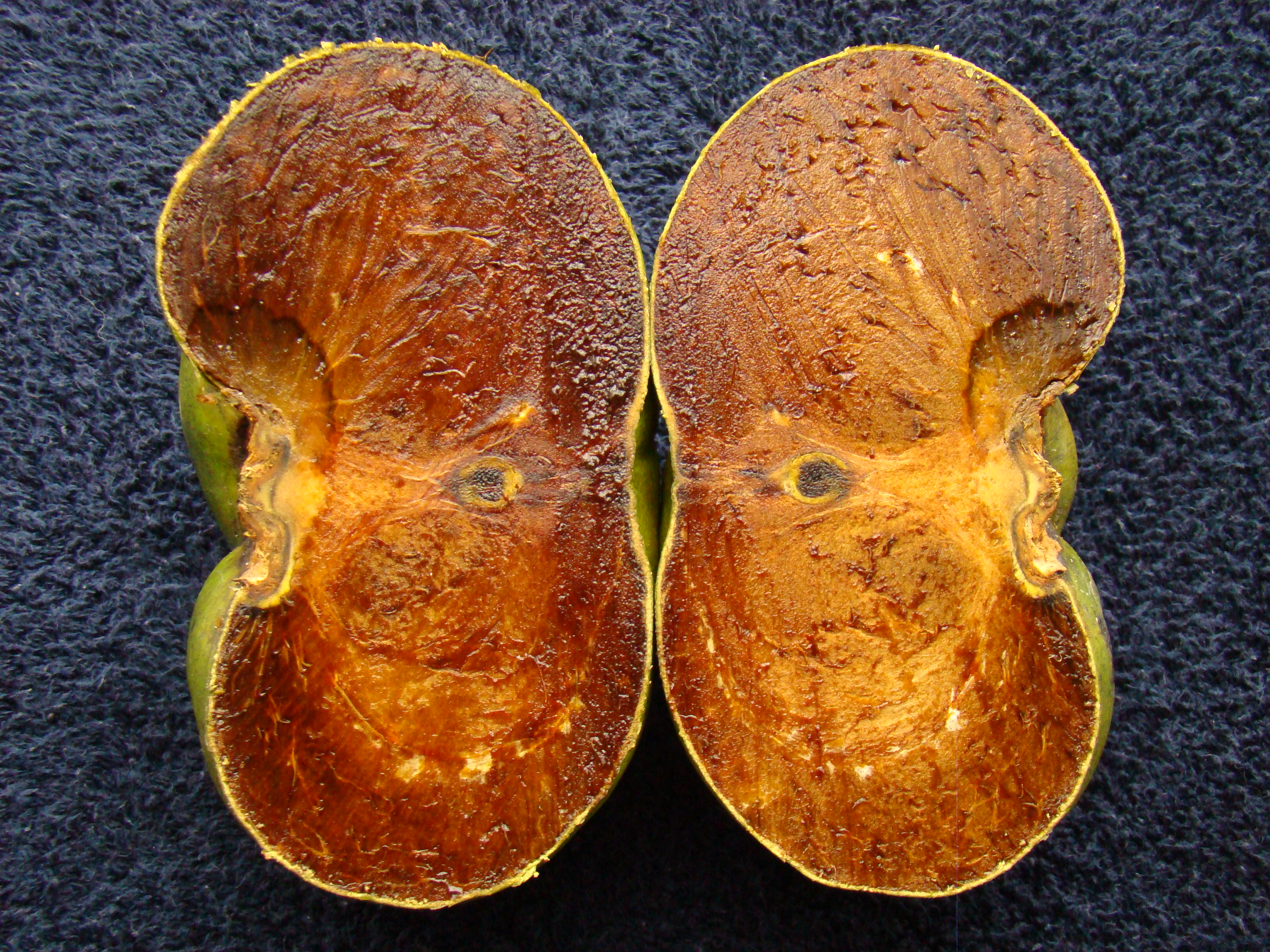

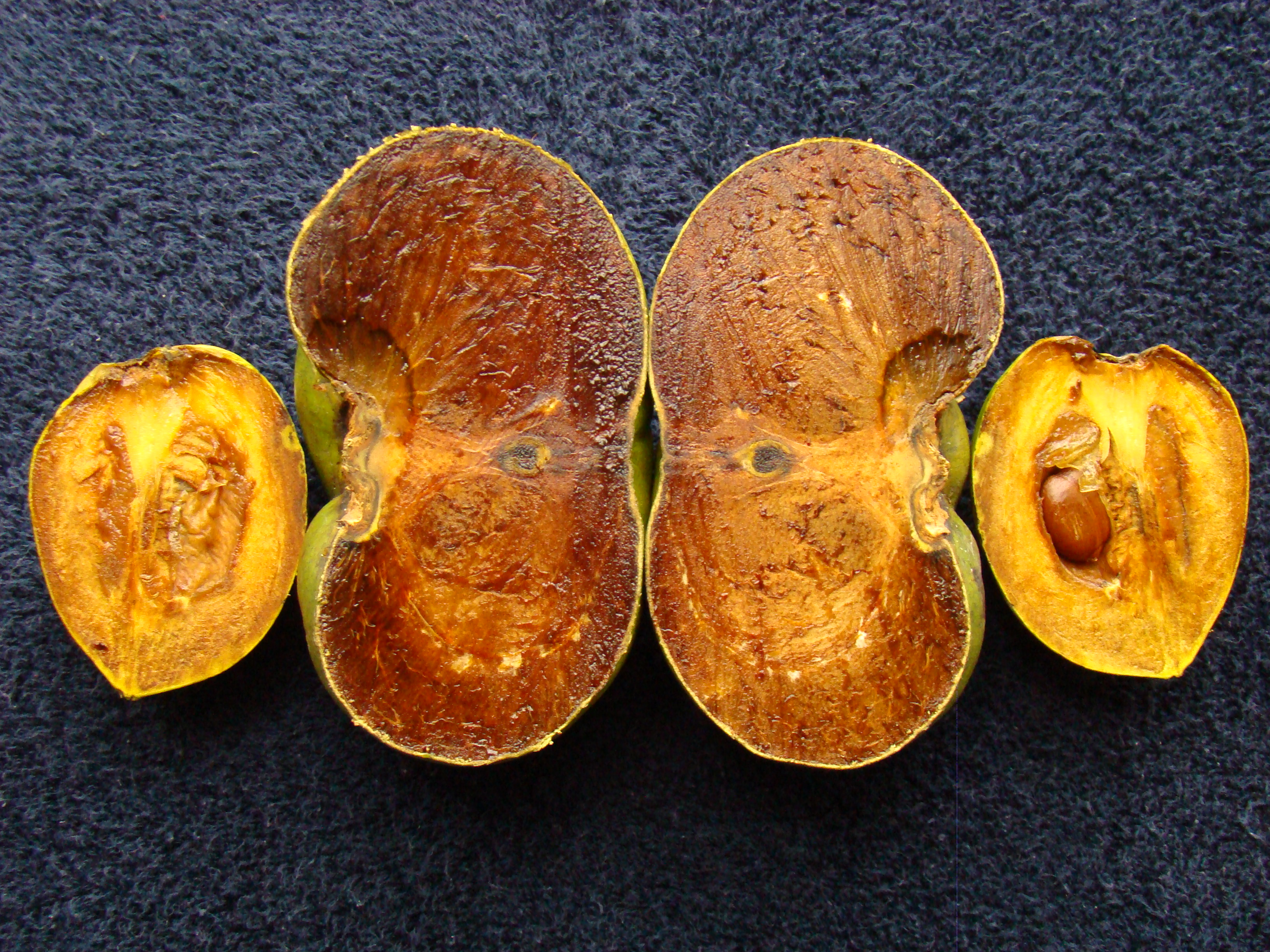

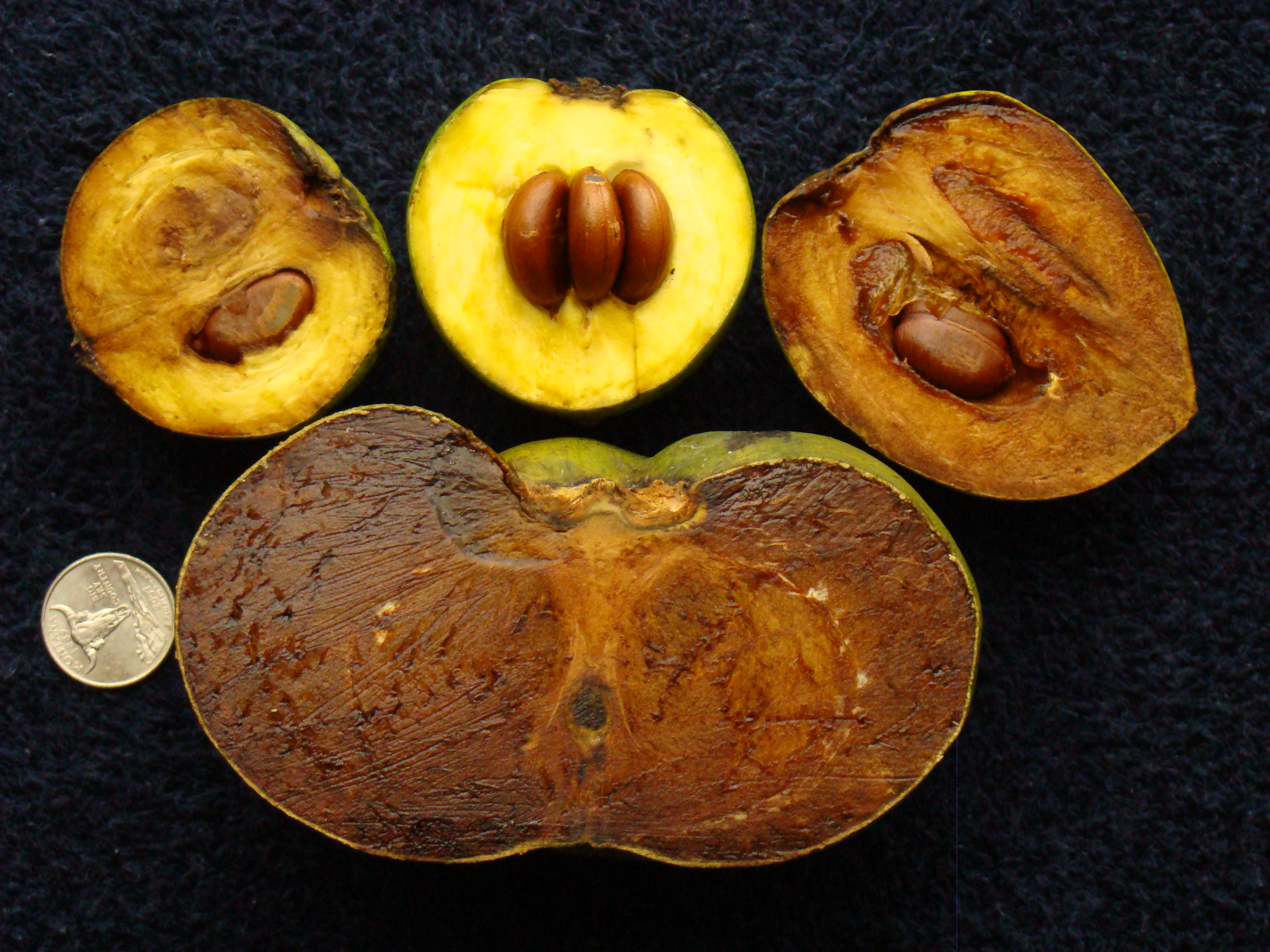

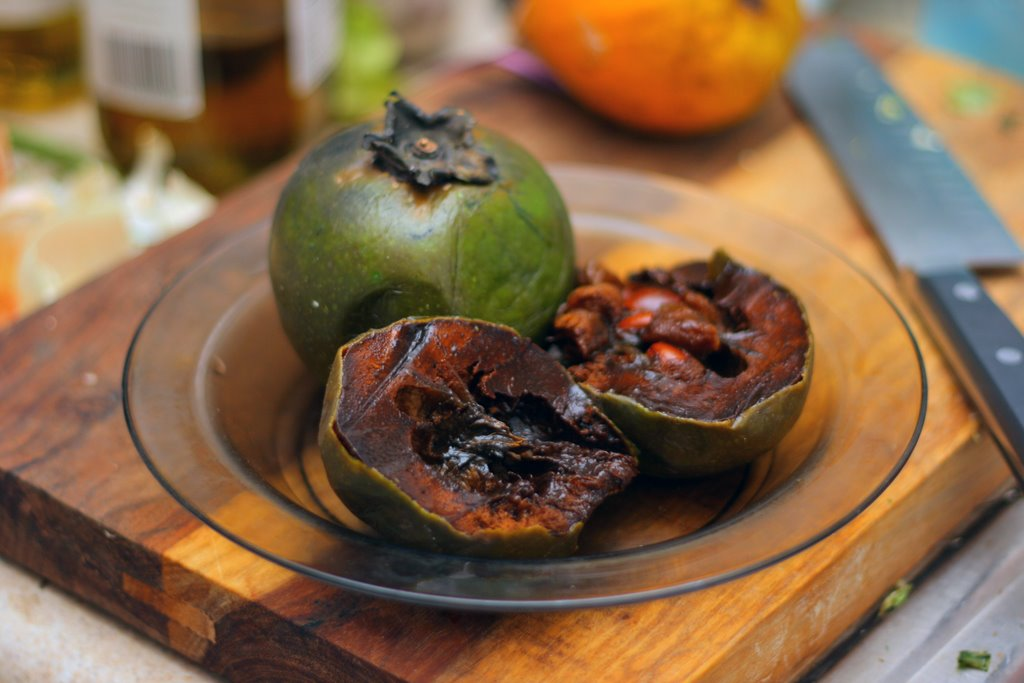

== Propagation ==
Propagation is usually from seed, which can retain viability for several months and require around 30 days for germination. Some trees are seedless however, and can be propagated by air-layering or shield budding.

== Cultivation ==
Black sapote trees are normally found below 600 meters, but are not particular about soil, and can tolerate light frosts. They are sensitive to drought, requiring irrigation in dry areas, but are quite tolerant of flooding. The tree grows fairly slowly for the first 3–4 years, perhaps just 1 foot/year for the first couple of years. Later however it grows much more rapidly. Trees should be spaced 10-12m apart (about 32–39 ft.).

Growing requirements: full sunlight, grows best in most well drained soils (sand and lime-stone based) and high pH soils (5.5-7.0), mature trees can tolerate -2/-3 °C (28-30 °F) temperatures and young trees can be killed at 0 °C (32 °F) temperatures.

Pollination takes place by insects, but some varieties are self-incompatible, meaning they require cross pollination.

== Cultivars ==
The range in size of tree and hairiness of leaves; size, shape, seediness, flesh color and sweetness of fruit; and time of fruiting suggest that considerable genetic variability exists. Selections have been made and propagated in the Philippines, Australia, and Florida, USA.

Seedless cultivars exist, such as 'Cuevas'.

=== Australian cultivars ===
'Bernicker' (also 'Bernecker') is a prolific producer of nearly spherical, medium to large fruit with few seeds and of superior quality.

'Mossman' has very large, round fruit of medium flavor with high pulp content and few seeds, and is capable of producing up to 450 kg per tree.

'Maher' has very large, flattened fruit of good to very good quality with few seeds. It is uniquely known among cultivars for being a small, yet prolific tree (up to 4 meters).

'Ricks Late' originated in NSW Australia and produces heavy, late crops with excellent quality.

'Superb' is a selection from North Queensland that bears large quantities of superb quality, small fruits that may be completely seedless if not cross pollinated.

'Cocktail' is described as having excellent flavor.

=== Florida cultivars ===
'Mérida' (also 'Reineke' or 'Reinecke') is named after the origin of its seed. It produces 70 kg or more of very sweet, small to medium-sized fruit of very good quality with 5-10 seeds, beginning 6–8 weeks earlier than other varieties (November in Florida).

=== Philippine cultivars ===
'Manilla' and 'Valesca' have few seeds.

== See also ==
- The distantly related mamey sapote (Sapotaceae) and the unrelated white sapote (Rutaceae).
- List of culinary fruits
