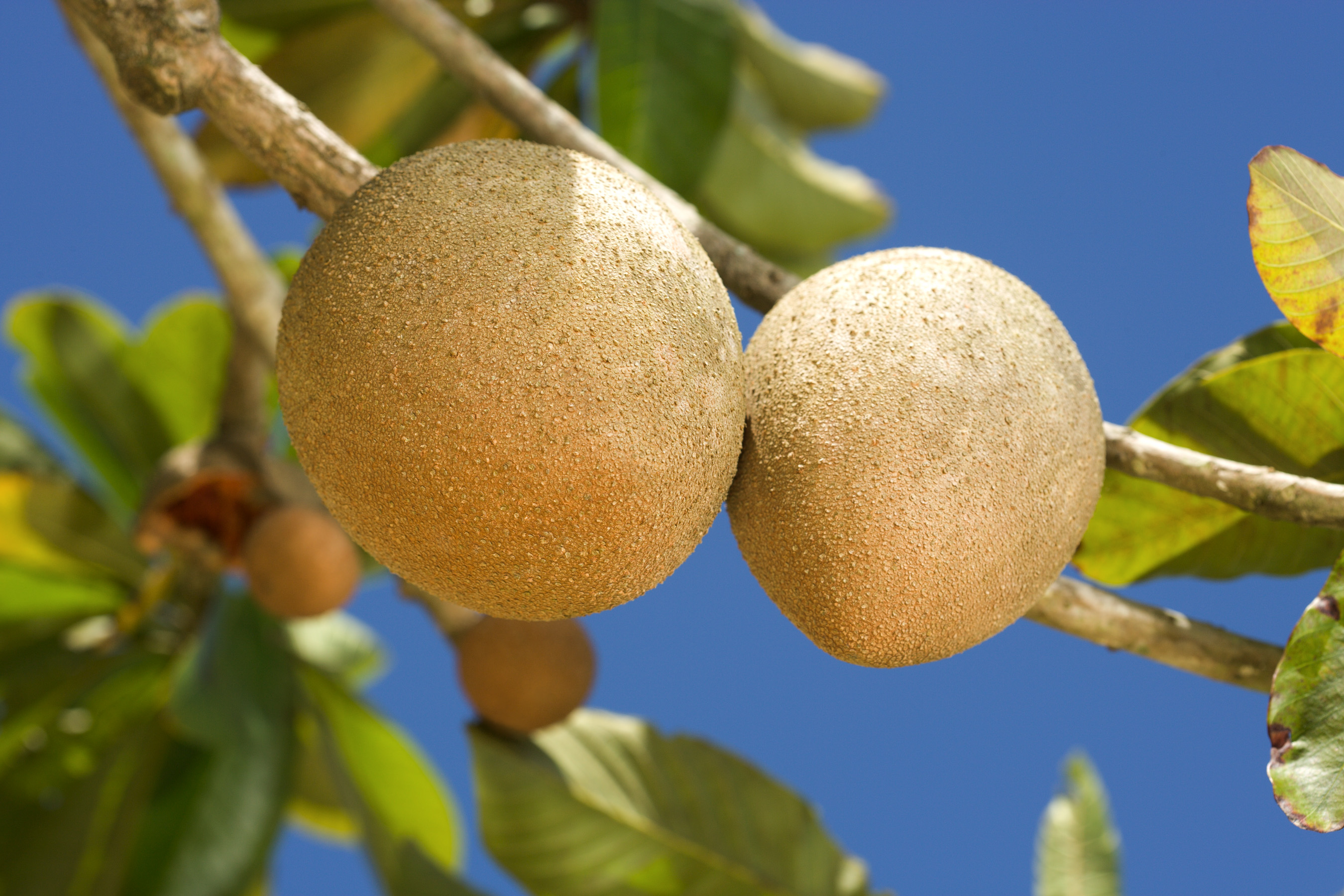

Conservation status
- Least Concern (IUCN 3.1)

Scientific classification
- Kingdom: Plantae
- Clade: Embryophytes
- Clade: Tracheophytes
- Clade: Angiosperms
- Clade: Eudicots
- Clade: Asterids
- Order: Ericales
- Family: Sapotaceae
- Genus: Pouteria
- Species: P. sapota

Binomial name
- Pouteria sapota (Jacq.) H. E. Moore & Stearn

Synonyms
- Calocarpum sapota (Jacq.) Merr.; Sideroxylon sapota Jacq.; Bassia jussaei Griseb.; Calocarpum huastecanum Gilly; Calospermum parvum Pierre; Lucuma bonplandii Kunth; Sapota mammosa Mill.

= Pouteria sapota =

Mamey sapote

Species of tree

Pouteria sapota, the mamey sapote, is a species of tree native to Central America and southern Mexico. It is now cultivated throughout Mexico, Central America, and the Caribbean, as well as in Florida and parts of South America. Its fruit is eaten raw in many Latin American countries, and is added to smoothies, milkshakes, ice cream, and other foods.

== Description ==
Mamey sapote is a large evergreen tree that can reach a height of 15 to 45 m (49 to 148 ft) at maturity. It is sometimes grown for its ornamental value in addition to its fruit.

The fruit, botanically a berry, is about 10 to 25 cm (4 to 10 in) long and 8 to 12 cm (3 to 4.5 in) wide and has flesh ranging in color from pink to orange to red. The brown skin has a texture somewhat between sandpaper and the fuzz on a peach. The fruit's texture is creamy and soft, and the flavor is a mix of sweet potato, pumpkin, honey, prune, peach, apricot, cantaloupe, cherry, and almond. A mamey sapote is ripe when the flesh is vibrant salmon in color when a fleck of the skin is removed. The flesh should give slightly, as with an overripe avocado. The leaves are pointed at both ends, 4 to 12 inches in length, and grow in clusters at the ends of branches.

The mamey sapote is in the same family as, and thus closely botanically related to, other sapotes such as sapodilla (Manilkara zapota), abiu (P. caimito), and canistel (Lucuma campechiana). However, other fruits that go by the common name 'sapote' are less closely related, such as the black sapote (Diospyros nigra) and white sapote (Casimiroa edulis).

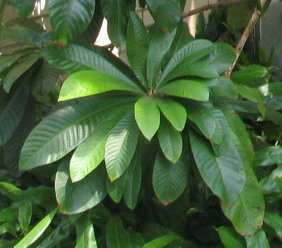
Leaves on tree

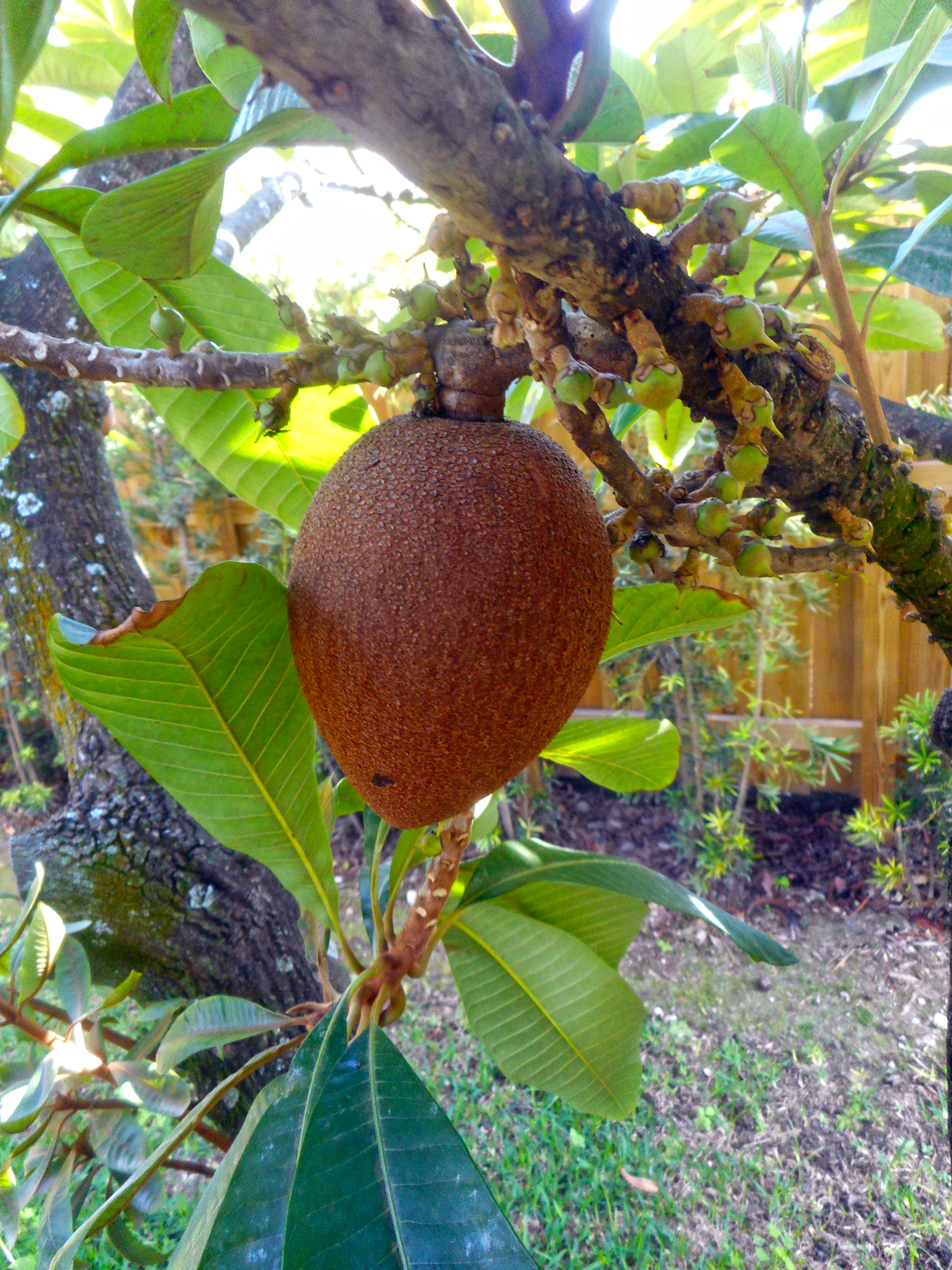
Fruit on branch

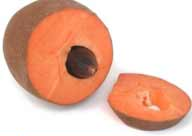
Fruit flesh and kernel

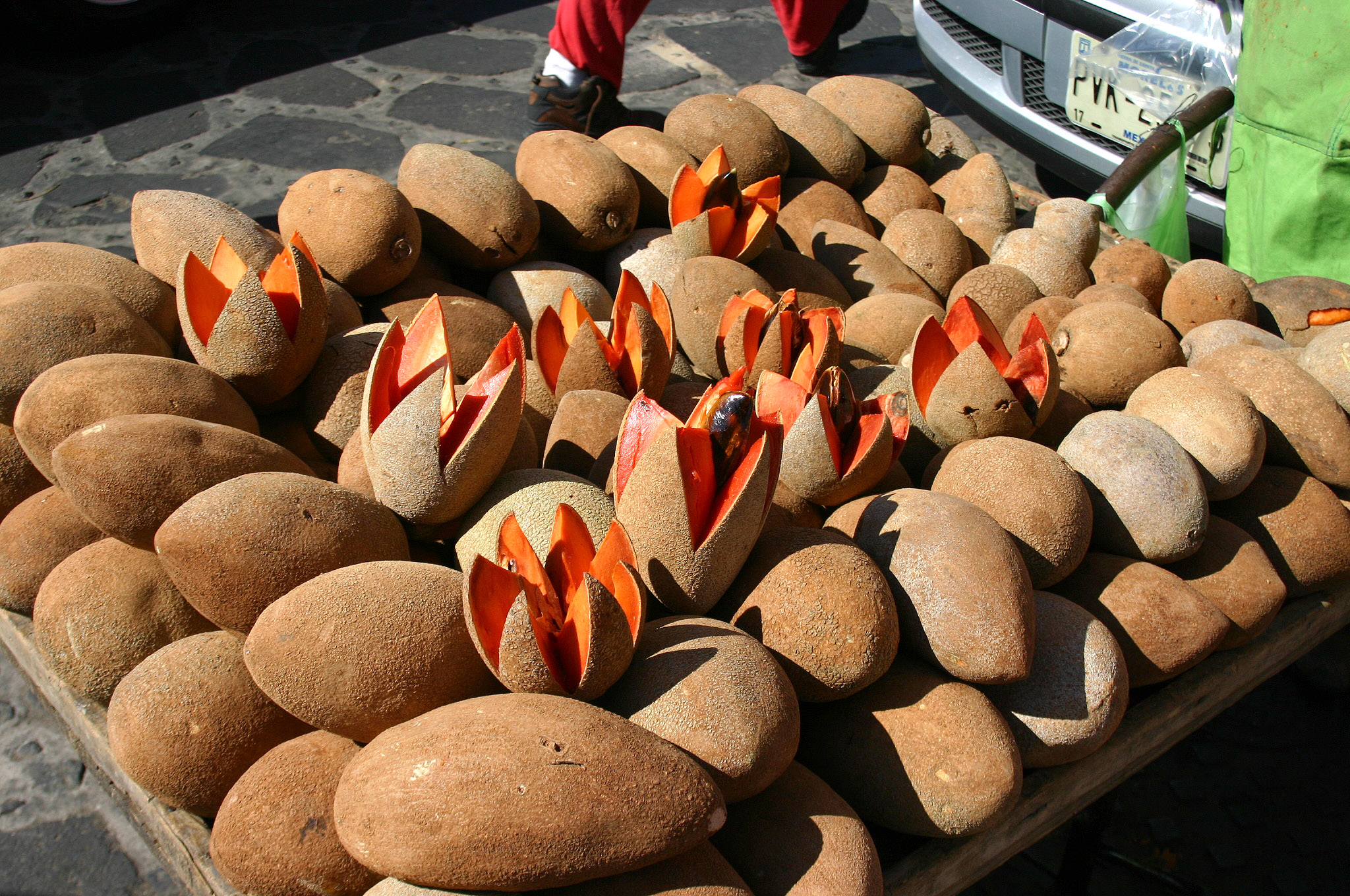
Mamey at a Tepoztlán market

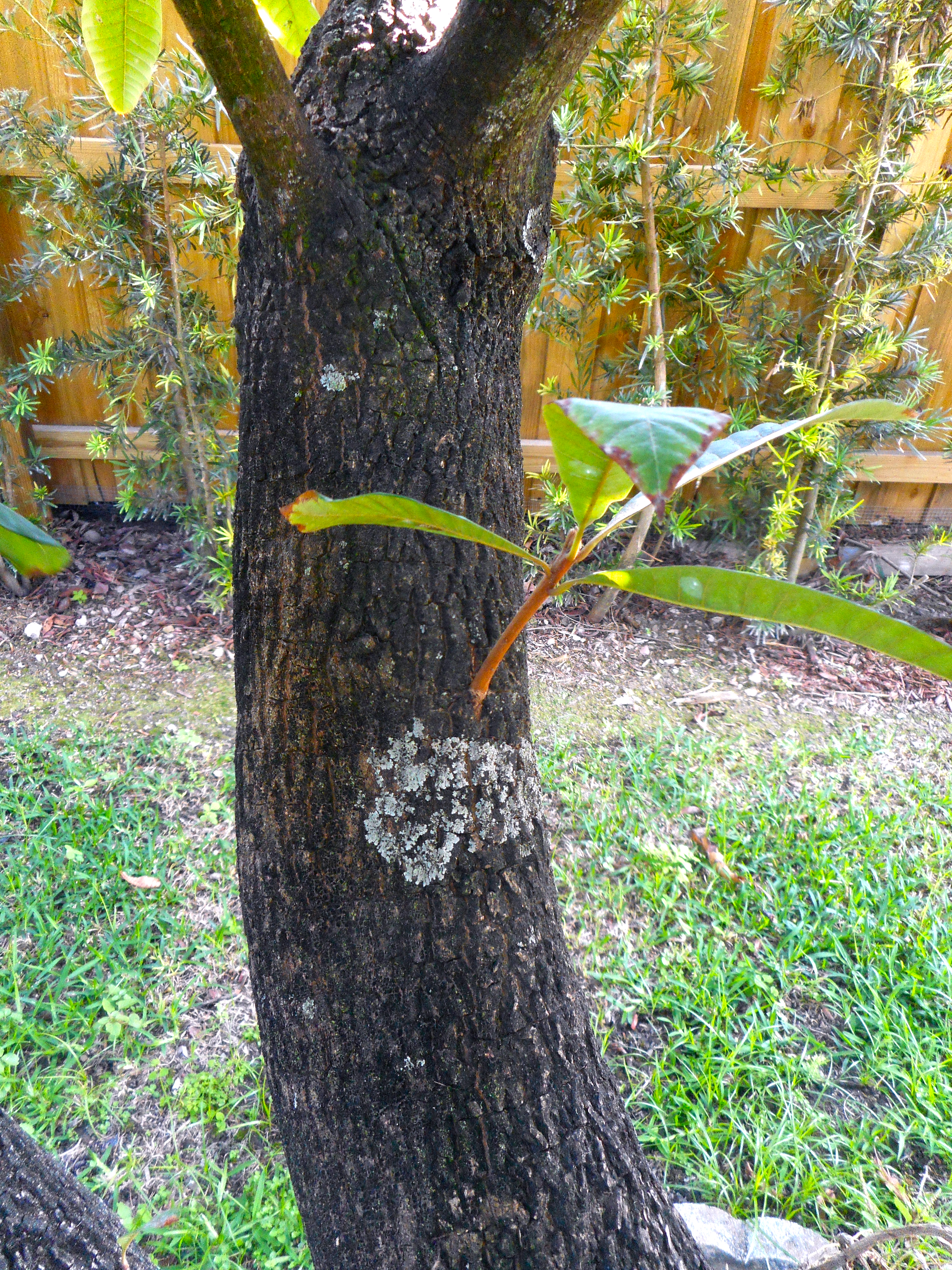
Tree bark

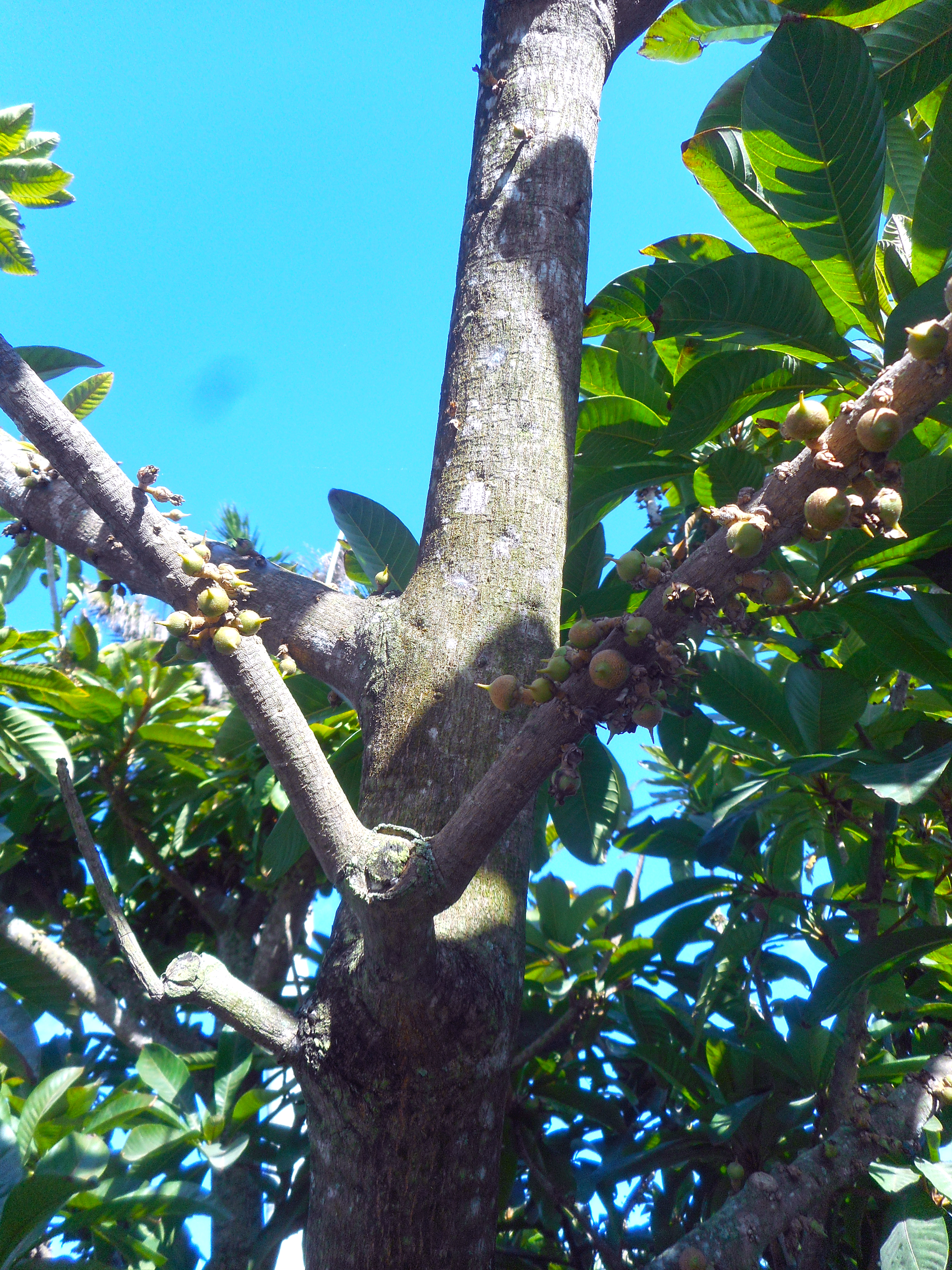
Branch with young fruit

== Distribution ==
The native range probably extends from the southern Mexican states of Veracruz, Tabasco, and Chiapas through Nicaragua, Belize, and northern Honduras. This is uncertain, however, because the tree was already widely cultivated in the tropical Americas prior to European colonization. Today, it is cultivated in most Mexican states, many Caribbean islands, and tropical continental America from Florida to Brazil. The first record of cultivation in south Florida dates to the 1880s. It has also been introduced to the Philippines, Indonesia, Malaysia, and Vietnam.

== Cultivation ==
It prefers smooth sandy, deep, clay and fertile soils, with pH of 5.5 to 6.5. The species does not tolerate low temperatures, prolonged periods of drought, or soils with bad drainage or where the water table is very high.

It is mainly propagated by grafting, which ensures the new plant has the same characteristics as the parent, especially its fruit, as it does not grow true to seed. Grafting also produces fruiting trees considerably faster than growing by seed - grafted trees produce fruit in 3–5 years while trees grown from seed require 7 or more years of growth before fruiting. Seeds lose viability within a month of harvest, so should be sown immediately.

Pouteria sapota trees are quite productive fruiters. A typical mature tree may produce 200–500 fruits per year, while vigorous established trees may produce more than twice this amount. The 2017 production average for Mexican growers was 12.4 tons/hectare.

In Florida, the fruit is harvested from May to July with some cultivars producing year-round.

=== Pests and diseases ===
Pouteria sapota is not often troubled by significant insect damage. The Cuban May beetle (Phyllophaga bruneri) and the sugarcane rootstalk borer (Diaprepes abbreviatus), along with various species of scale and spider mites are known to attack the plant, but rarely is the infestation significant.

Oviposition by fruit flies (Tephritidae) onto the fruit can cause damage to the pulp, although this appears to be deterred in P. sapota, perhaps related to its latex production and ability to expeditiously form cork on scars. Among the most important species in this respect is Anastrepha serpentina, known as the sapote fly, specializing in Sapotaceae plants.

== Uses ==
Sapote, mamey, raw
Nutritional value per 100 g (3.5 oz)
- Energy: 520 kJ (120 kcal)
- Carbohydrates: 32.1 g
- Sugars: 20.14 g
- Dietary fiber: 5.4 g
- Fat: 0.46 g
- Protein: 1.45 g
Vitamins and minerals
Vitamins	Quantity %DV^{†}
Thiamine (B1)	1% 0.013 mg
Riboflavin (B2)	9% 0.116 mg
Niacin (B3)	9% 1.432 mg
Pantothenic acid (B5)	8% 0.397 mg
Vitamin B6	42% 0.72 mg
Folate (B9)	2% 7 μg
Vitamin C	26% 23 mg
Vitamin E	14% 2.11 mg
Minerals	Quantity %DV^{†}
Calcium	1% 18 mg
Iron	4% 0.78 mg
Magnesium	3% 11 mg
Manganese	9% 0.204 mg
Phosphorus	2% 26 mg
Potassium	15% 454 mg
Sodium	0% 7 mg
Zinc	2% 0.19 mg
- Link to USDA Database entry
- ^{†}Percentages estimated using US recommendations for adults, except for potassium, which is estimated based on expert recommendation from the National Academies.

The fruit is eaten raw or made into milkshakes, smoothies, ice cream, and paletas. It can be used to produce marmalade and jelly. Some beauty products use oil pressed from the seed, otherwise known as sapayul oil.

=== Nutrition ===
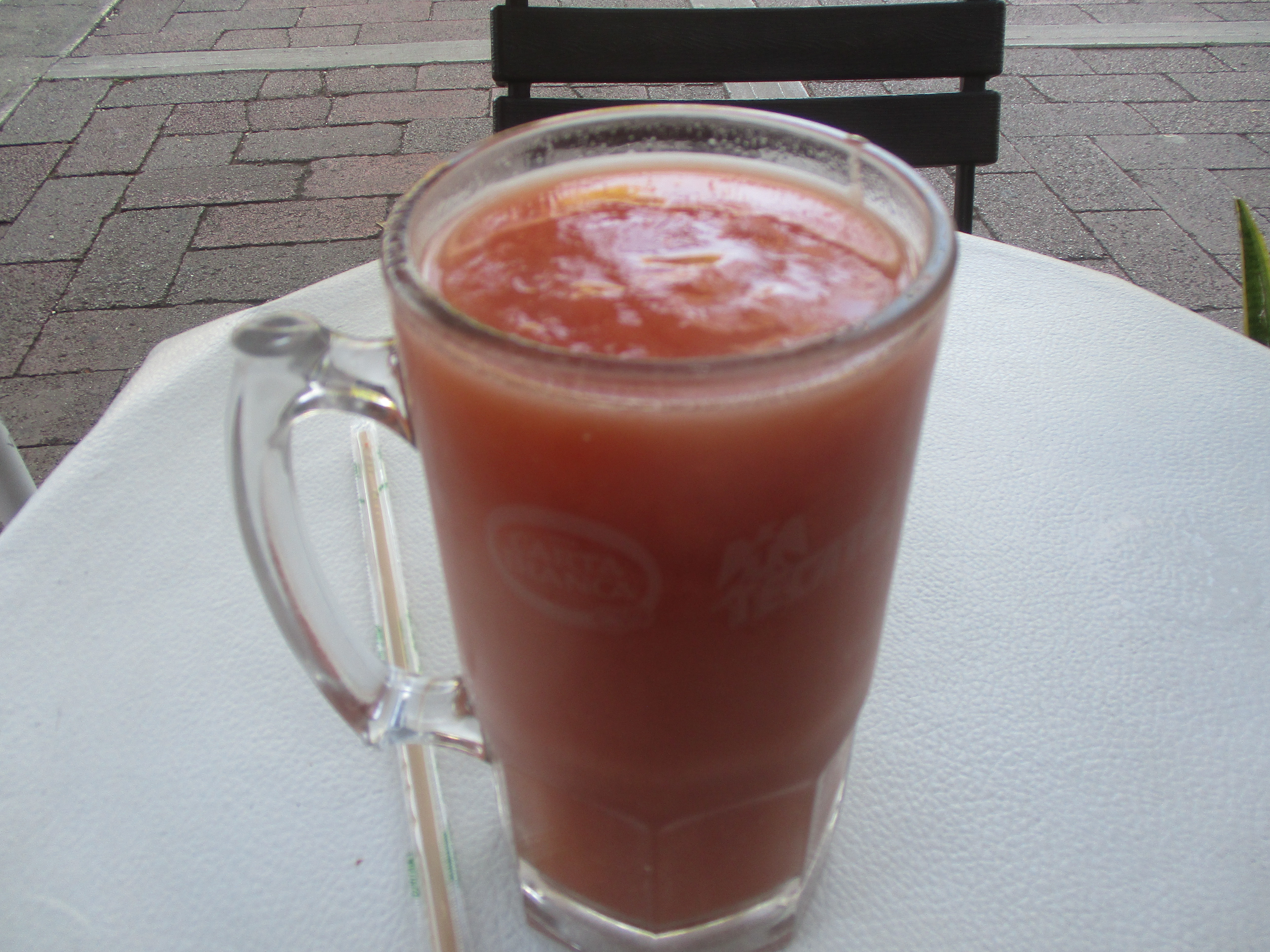
Mamey agua fresca served in Mérida, Yucatán

The fruit is an excellent source of vitamins B_{6} and C, and is a good source of riboflavin, niacin, vitamin E, manganese, potassium, and dietary fiber. Research has identified several new carotenoids from the ripe fruit.

== See also ==
- Lucuma
- Mammea americana (mamey apple)
- Sapodilla
