= Asa Gray disjunction =

Regional species distribution pattern

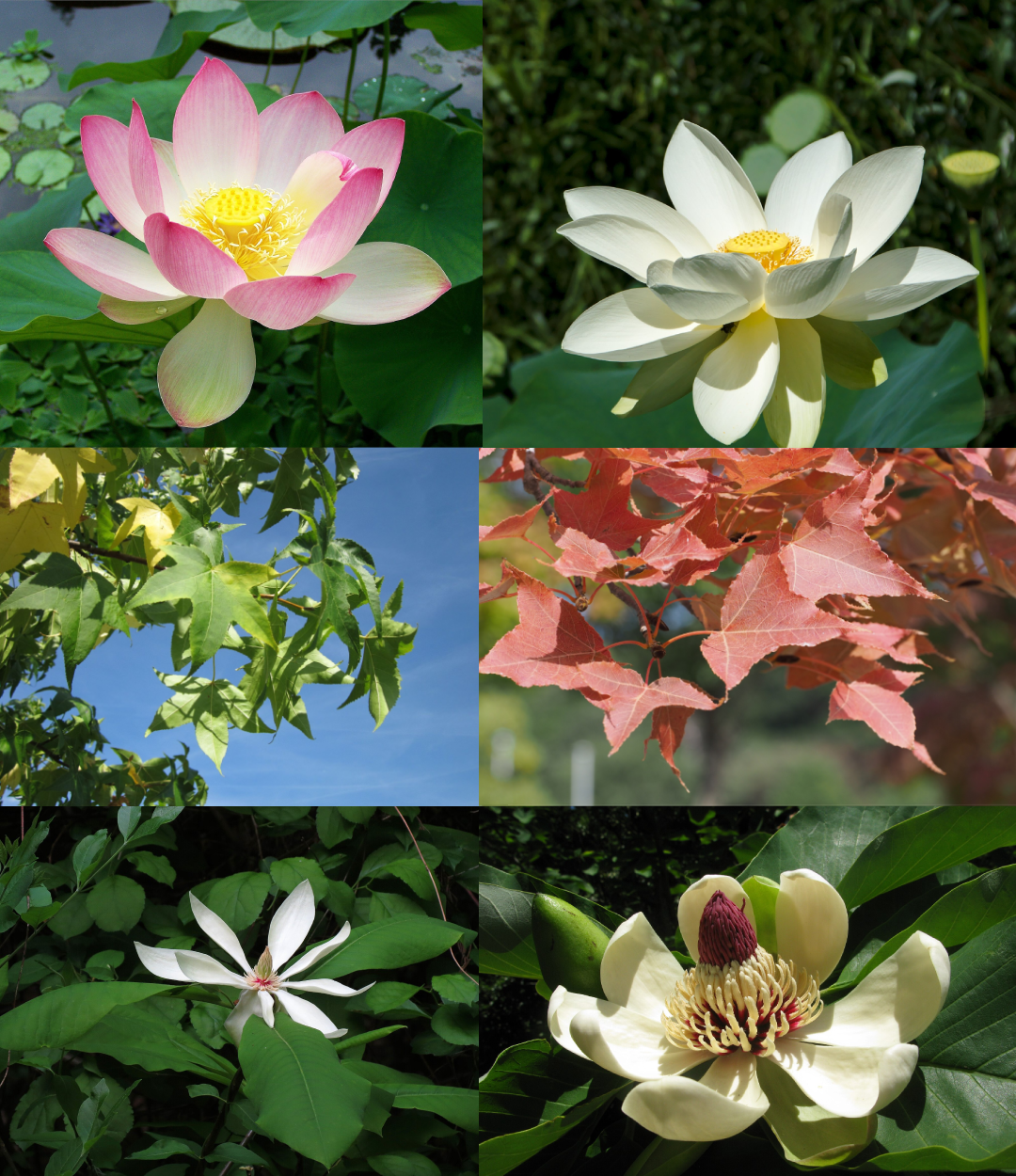
Examples of organisms affected by the Asa Gray Distribution, including Nelumbo nucifera (top left), Nelumbo lutea (top right), Liquidambar styraciflua (middle left), Liquidambar formosana (middle right), Magnolia tripetala (bottom left), and Magnolia obovata (bottom right)

The Asa Gray disjunction, also known as the Eastern Asian–Eastern North American disjunction, refers to a biogeographical pattern or biogeographical phenomenon in which closely related plant, fungi and animal species are found in temperate forests of eastern Asia and eastern North America, but not in Western North America or Western Europe. This striking distribution pattern was first systematically documented by American botanist Asa Gray in the mid-19th century, who noted the remarkable floristic similarities between the two distant regions. Gray’s observations were foundational in both plant and animal geography and evolutionary theory, providing early support for Charles Darwin's ideas of common descent and speciation. The phenomenon includes over 65 flowering plant genera alone.

Today, most scientists consider the Eastern Asian–Eastern North American disjunction to be best explained by the Tertiary relict hypothesis—the idea that many of the disjunct taxa are surviving remnants of a once widespread temperate forest flora that extended across the Northern Hemisphere during the Paleogene and early Neogene periods. Fossil evidence from Europe, Asia, and western North America confirms the historical presence of numerous genera now exhibiting disjunct distributions, including Magnolia, Liriodendron, and Cotinus, among others. Notably, fossil sites such as the Latah Formation and other deposits within the Columbia River Basalt Group demonstrate that many of the taxa now restricted to eastern Asia and eastern North America were present in western North America as recently as the Neogene, approximately 17 to 4 million years ago. The western fossils of these plants that today experience the disjunction are considered part of the Arcto-Tertiary Geoflora. This floristic kingdom primarily existed during the Paleocene–Eocene Thermal Maximum. Climatic shifts at the end of the Neogene caused fragmentation in the populations of many organisms, ultimately leading to the modern disjunction.

== History ==
The biogeographic connection between eastern Asia and eastern North America has intrigued naturalists since the 18th century, with early observations by Carl Linnaeus and others noting similarities in plant species across the two regions. However, it was American botanist Asa Gray who first systematically explored and publicized the phenomenon in the mid-19th century. In an 1859 essay, Gray documented striking floristic parallels between eastern North America and Japan, arguing that these patterns could be explained by a shared evolutionary history—a claim that became one of the first applications of Darwinian evolution in plant geography. Gray's disjunction thesis not only advanced biogeography but also bolstered Darwin's theory of evolution, placing Gray at the center of debates with contemporaries such as Louis Agassiz. His work led to a surge of botanical exploration in both Asia and North America, especially in the late 19th and early 20th centuries, with botanists like Charles Sargent and E. H. Wilson expanding the empirical foundation of the disjunction pattern. The pattern was later noticed in animal genera such as arachnids, millipedes, insects, and freshwater fishes. Several hypotheses have been proposed to explain the biogeographical disjunction between eastern Asia and eastern North America. One explanation, the Ecological Convergence Hypothesis, suggests that similar environmental conditions—such as temperate, mesic climates and deciduous forests—led to the independent evolution of analogous traits in unrelated species occupying comparable ecological niches. Another view held by many scientists was the Tertiary Relict Hypothesis, proposes that many disjunct taxa are remnants of once-continuous lineages that spread across the Northern Hemisphere during the Tertiary period, later fragmented by climatic cooling, extinctions, and geological changes. A third explanation, the Taxonomic Revision and Morphological Misinterpretation Hypothesis, highlights how early botanists often misidentified morphologically similar species as being the same; molecular studies have since shown that many are distinct sister taxa, with similarities resulting from shared ancestry and limited convergence rather than direct equivalence. By the late 20th century, the disjunction had become a textbook case in plant biogeography and was increasingly investigated using fossil records and phylogenetic tools. Fossil and genetic evidence showed that the Tertiary Relict Hypothesis was more likely.

== Causes of modern disjunction ==
Fossil records provide strong support for the hypothesis that many of the species now found only in eastern Asia and eastern North America once had a much wider distribution across the Northern Hemisphere, including western North America and Europe. During the Paleogene period (roughly 66–23 million years ago), a continuous belt of temperate mixed mesophytic forests stretched across North America, Europe, and Asia, supported by a globally warmer and more humid climate. Paleobotanical evidence from fossilized leaves, fruits, and pollen indicates that many genera with current disjunct distributions—such as Liriodendron, Magnolia, and Nyssa—were once present in what is now the western United States, Greenland, and Europe. The disjunction that exists today between eastern Asia and eastern North America is largely the result of dramatic climatic and geological changes that occurred during the Neogene and Quaternary periods. As the global climate cooled, beginning in the mid-Miocene and intensifying through the Pliocene and Pleistocene, many areas that once supported temperate forests became arid or frozen. This climate shift caused the contraction and fragmentation of forests, particularly in Europe and western North America, where mountain building and increased seasonality limited the availability of refugia. As a result, many lineages that had once been widespread were lost from the western part of the continent and from central Asia. However, the forests of eastern North America and eastern Asia were comparatively stable and more topographically complex, providing refuges that allowed these lineages to persist. Thus, the modern disjunction can be seen as a relic of a formerly continuous distribution, preserved only in regions that escaped the most severe glacial and aridification events. The closure of intercontinental migration routes further contributed to the isolation of eastern Asian and eastern North American lineages. The Bering Land Bridge, which had allowed plant and animal exchange between Asia and North America throughout much of the Tertiary, was eventually submerged and rendered impassable. With the loss of this corridor, gene flow between the two regions ceased, and the once-connected populations began to diverge independently. In many lineages, this vicariant separation led to speciation events, while in others it simply reinforced already existing differences.

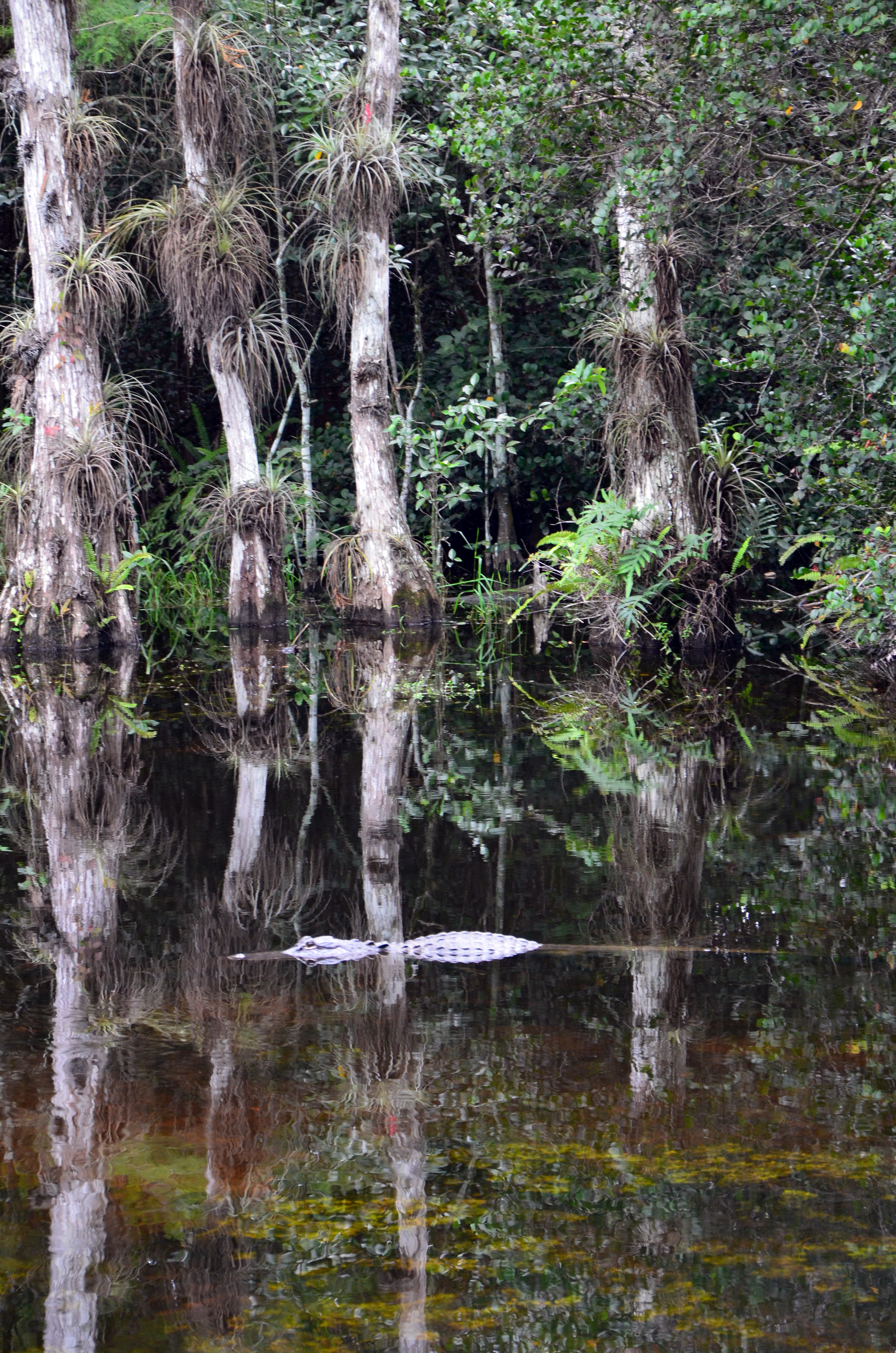
An American alligator moving near a stand of bald cypress—two species connected to the Asa Gray disjunction.

=== Organisms affected ===
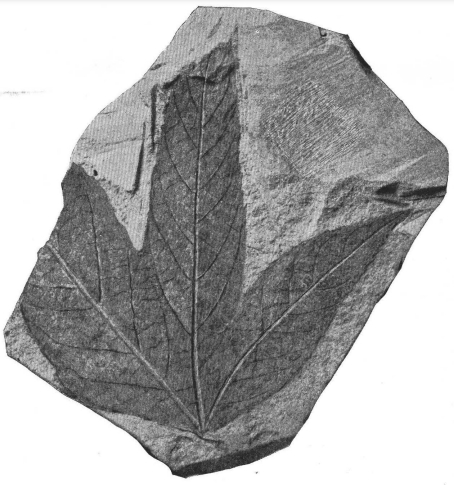
A fossil of Liquidambar pachyphyllum, a sweetgum that lived in Western North America during the Neogene

Organisms affected include:

- Osmunda
- Osmundastrum
- Claytosmunda
- Taxodioideae
- Adlumia
- Aletris
- Ampelopsis
- Antenoron
- Apios
- Aralia
- Astilbe
- Brachyelytrum
- Buckleya
- Campsis
- Carya
- Catalpa
- Caulophyllum
- Cladrastis
- Cotinus
- Croomia
- Decumaria
- Diarrhena
- Diphylleia
- Epigaea
- Gelsemium
- Gleditsia
- Gordonia
- Gymnocladus
- Halesia
- Hamamelis
- Hydrangea
- Hydrastis
- Illicium
- Itea
- Jeffersonia
- Lespedeza
- Leucophysalis
- Lindera
- Liriodendron
- Liquidambar
- Lyonia
- Magnolia
- Meehania
- Menispermum
- Mitchella
- Nelumbo
- Nyssa
- Osmanthus
- Pachysandra
- Panax
- Parthenocissus
- Penthorum
- Phryma
- Pieris
- Podophyllum
- Pyrularia
- Sassafras
- Saururus
- Schisandra
- Shortia
- Stewartia
- Stylophorum
- Symplocarpus
- Tipularia
- Trachelospermum
- Triosteum
- Wisteria
- Zizania
- Eriosomatinae
- Polyodontidae
- Cryptobranchidae
- Alligator

=== Organisms not affected ===
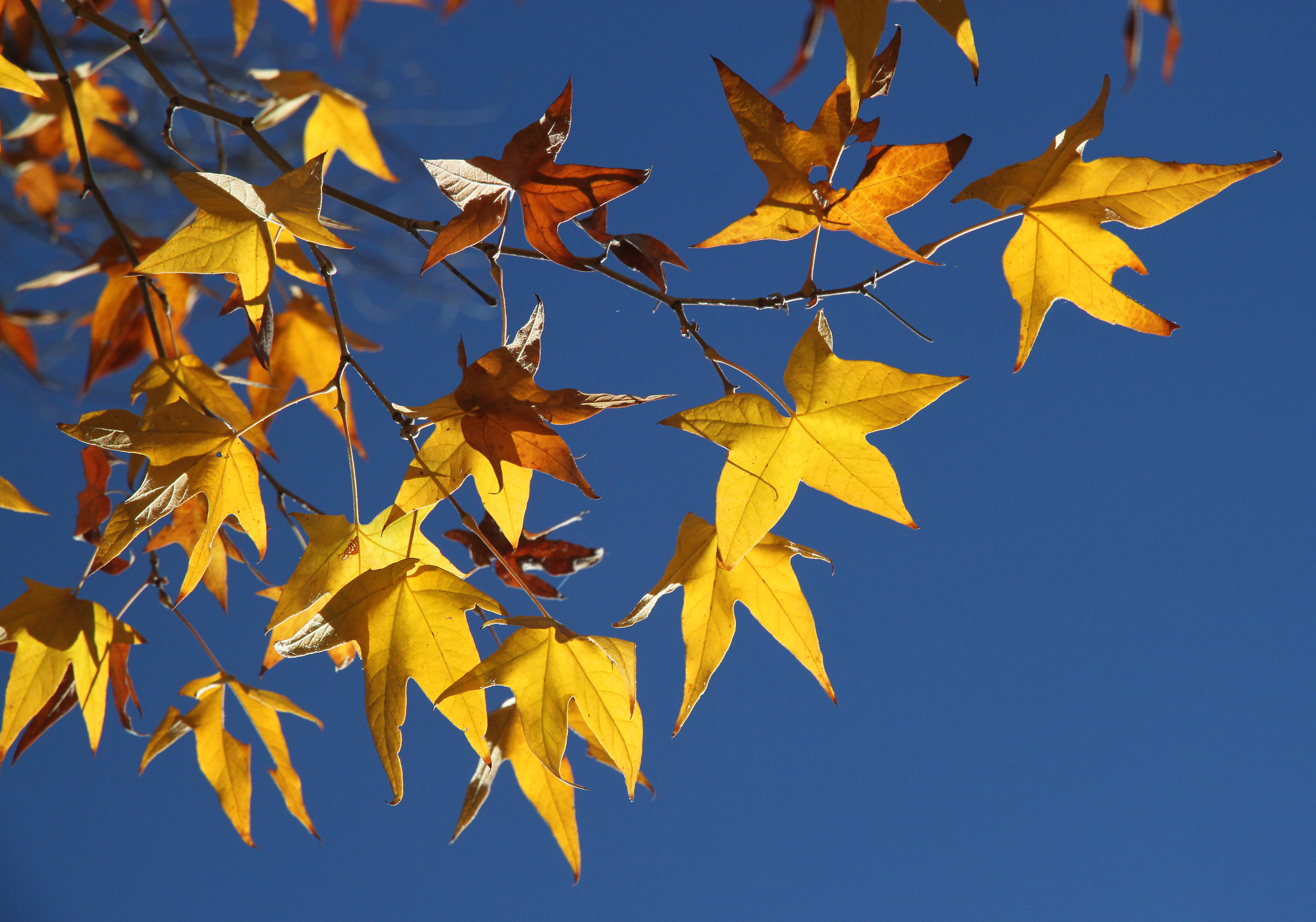
Sycamores (plane trees) like Platanus wrightii are good examples of organisms which were not affected.

Organisms unaffected by the forces that caused the Eastern Asian–Eastern North American disjunction show significant variation, and little is known about why these genera did not experience fragmentation. Plant genera that remained continuous across these regions include Abelia, Abies, Acer, Adoxa, Aesculus, Alisma, Alnus, Amelanchier, Anemone, Angelica, Asarum, Betula, Carpinus, Castanea, Circaea, Clematis, Clintonia, Corylus, Crataegus, Elliottia, Epilobium, Fagus, Fraxinus, Hydrangea, Juglans, Juniperus, Lilium, Lonicera, Malus, Osmorhiza, Ostrya, Pedicularis, Picea, Pinus, Platanus, Polygonatum, Polygonum, Populus, Prunus, Quercus, Rhododendron, Rhus, Ribes, Sagittaria, Sambucus, Sanicula, Sapindus, Saxifraga, Smilax, Sorbus, Staphylea, Styrax, Symphoricarpos, Symplocos, Taxus, Teucrium, Tilia, Torreya, Toxicodendron, Ulmus, Vaccinium, Valeriana, and Viburnum. A striking contrast to this pattern is seen in Sequoioideae (the redwood subfamily), where only one species, Metasequoia glyptostroboides (dawn redwood), inhabits eastern Asia, while the other two—Sequoiadendron giganteum (sierra redwood) and Sequoia sempervirens (coast redwood)—are restricted to western North America. A similar case is seen in the genus Pseudotsuga (Douglas firs). Some organisms that are not part of the Eastern Asian–Eastern North American disjunction have been so heavily affected by the same extinction forces that caused the disjunction that they now survive only in Asia, with the Ginkgo, Cercidiphyllum, Keteleeria, Pseudolarix, Cephalotaxus and to some extent, Metasequoia serving as a prime examples. The genus Ilex is sometimes considered to have been affected by the Asa Gray disjunction, though some researchers argue it was not.

== Ecological effects ==
The Eastern Asian–Eastern North American disjunction has significant ecological implications, particularly for the structure and composition of temperate deciduous forest ecosystems.

== See also ==
Klondike Mountain Formation
