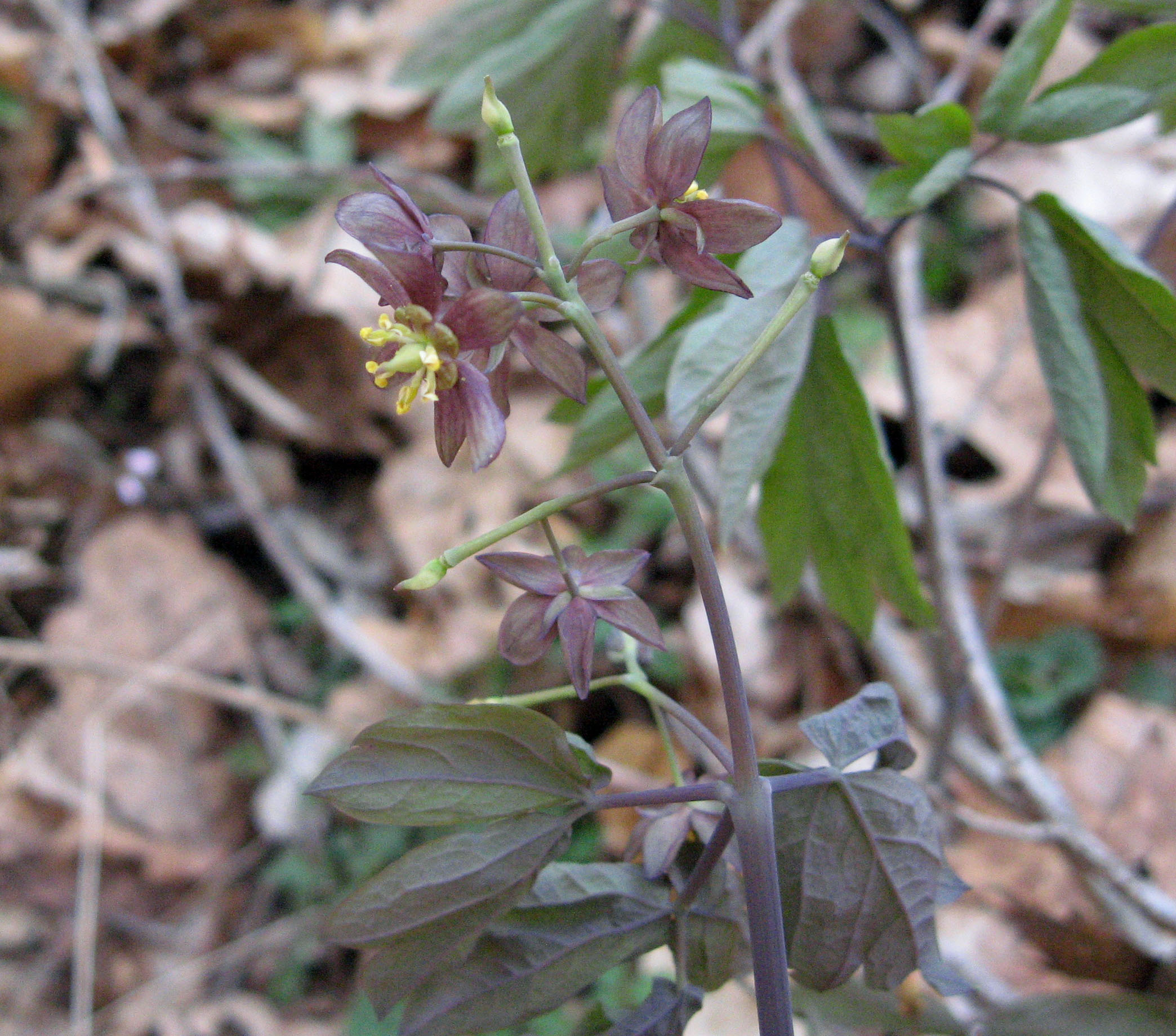

Scientific classification
- Kingdom: Plantae
- Clade: Tracheophytes
- Clade: Angiosperms
- Clade: Eudicots
- Order: Ranunculales
- Family: Berberidaceae
- Genus: Caulophyllum
- Species: C. giganteum

Binomial name
- Caulophyllum giganteum (Farwell) Loconte & Blackwel

= Caulophyllum giganteum =

Species of flowering plant

Caulophyllum giganteum, the northern blue cohosh, is a species of flowering plant in the barberry family. It is native primarily to northeastern North America, where it is found in rich forests.

Caulophyllum giganteum produces around four to eighteen purple flowers in early spring. It blooms around 10–15 days earlier than its relative, Caulophyllum thalictroides. C. thalictroides also differs by having more abundant flowers that are yellow or green.
