= Disjunct distribution =

Large geographic separation between members of a taxon

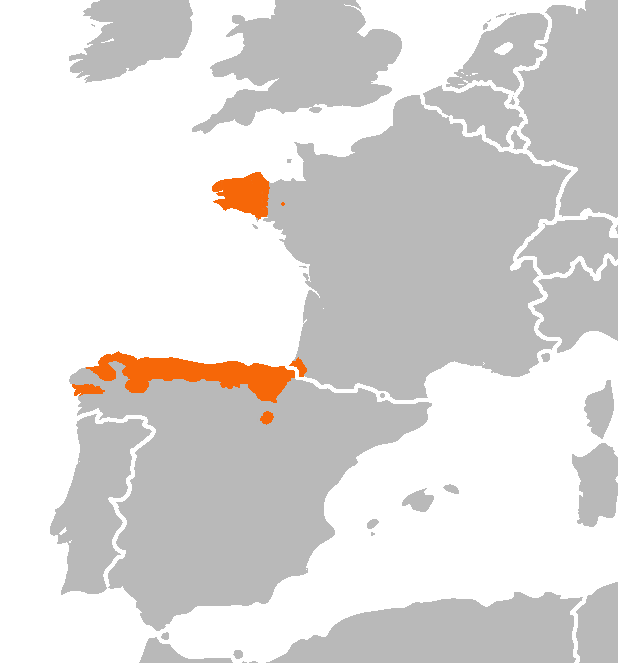
Range of the snail Elona quimperiana, an example of a disjunct distribution

In biology, a taxon with a disjunct distribution or disjunctive population is one that has two or more groups that are related but considerably separated from each other geographically. The causes are varied and might demonstrate either the expansion or contraction of a species' range.

== Range fragmentation ==
Also called range fragmentation, disjunct distributions may be caused by changes in the environment, such as mountain building and continental drift or rising sea levels. It may also be due to an organism expanding its range into new areas, by such means as rafting, or other animals transporting a propagule to a new location; seeds consumed by birds and animals can be moved to new locations during migrations, and those seeds can be deposited in fecal matter. Other conditions that can produce disjunct distributions include flooding, changes in wind, stream, and current flows, and other anthropogenic introduction of introduced species either accidentally or deliberately through agriculture and horticulture.

== Habitat fragmentation ==
Disjunct distributions can occur when suitable habitat is fragmented, which produces fragmented populations, and when that fragmentation becomes so divergent that species movement between one suitable habitat to the next is disrupted, isolated population can be produced. Extinctions can cause disjunct distribution, especially in areas where only scattered areas are habitable by a species; for instance, island chains or specific elevations along a mountain range or areas along a coast or between bodies of water like streams, lakes and ponds.

== Consequences ==
If a population remains disjunct from the rest of the species' populations it may become extirpated due to an inability to adapt to its new environment or be rescued by nearby populations. However, if the population is able to adapt to its new environment speciation may occur due to the lack of gene flow with other populations and an accumulation of local adaptations. Although it can be difficult to determine if speciation is truly occurring, the degree of speciation of a disjunctive population can be determined using molecular, chromosomal, and morphological approaches. Historical examples of speciation can also be used to characterize the process of speciation when caused by a disjunctive population, such as that of the Virginia opossum, Didelphis virginiana. They are the only extant marsupial species found in North America because some of their ancestors migrated from South America during the Great American Interchange and were then cut off from South American populations when the Isthmus of Panama closed.

== Examples ==
There are many patterns of disjunct distributions at many scales: Europe - East Asia, Europe-South Africa (e.g. genus Erica), Mediterranean-Hoggart disjunction (genus Olea), amphi-Pacific distribution (Australia - South America), Asa Gray disjunction (eastern North America and East Asia), etc.

=== Lusitanian distribution ===
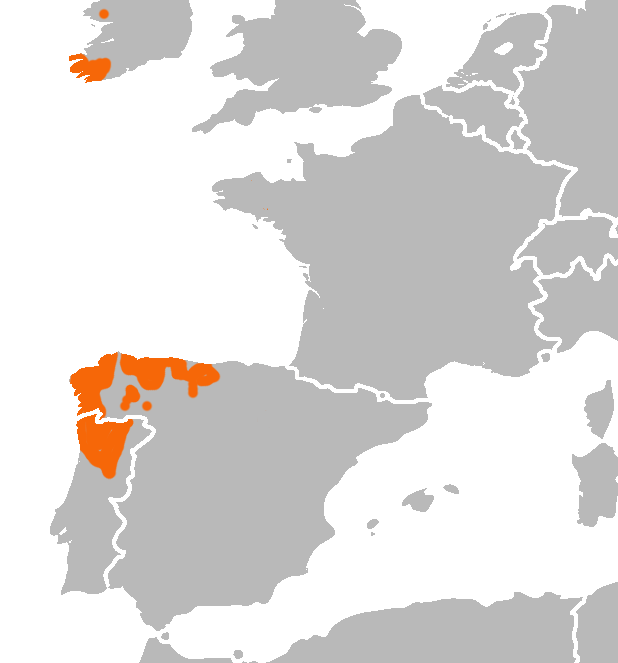
The range map of Geomalacus maculosus shows a 'Lusitanian' distribution.

This kind of disjunct distribution of a species, such that it occurs in Iberia and in Ireland, without any intermediate localities, is usually called "Lusitanian" (named after the Roman Province Lusitania, corresponding roughly to modern-day Portugal).

Examples of animal species with a Lusitanian distribution are: the Kerry slug Geomalacus maculosus and the Pyrenean glass snail Semilimax pyrenaicus. Plant species with this kind of distribution include several heather species (Calluna spp.) and the strawberry tree (Arbutus unedo).

The theory behind the name "Lusitanian" is now discredited; it posited that there was an ice-free land mass that served as a refugium off of the south-west of Ireland during the Quaternary (last) glaciation. In this refugium, relic fauna and flora from a previous ice-free period survived until the present warmer interstadial period. Although the theory is no longer accepted, the term Lusitanian is still used as a descriptive term for faunal elements such as the Kerry slug.

Recently a better explanation of the occurrence of the Kerry slug and similar faunal elements in southwestern Ireland has been developed. This new theory is supported by two recent discoveries: the genetic similarity of much of Ireland's fauna to that of northern Spain, and the genetic similarity of much of Ireland's human population to that of northern Spain.

Mascheretti et al. (2003) examined the genotypes of Eurasian pygmy shrew, a small mammal, across its range in Europe. The Irish population showed close genetic affinity to a population from Andorra but not to that of Britain or other places in Europe. The genetic structure of the population further showed that the entire Irish population of the Eurasian pygmy shrew had originated from a single founder event. The authors concluded that it had been introduced in the early (Paleolithic) or middle (Mesolithic) Stone Age, by boat, probably from south-west Europe. This coincides with work on human populations, which found a strong genetic similarity in make-up between populations in western Ireland and in northern Spain. This would be explained by a human migration from Spain to Ireland in the late Paleolithic or early Mesolithic.

It seems increasingly likely that much of Ireland's Lusitanian fauna is in reality an artefact of this era of human expansion in the early part of the Postglacial era. In other words, it seems likely that these species were introduced accidentally with trade items or goods brought by boat from Iberia.

=== Asa Gray disjunction ===
The Asa Gray disjunction is a frequently-seen disjunct distribution where plant species in Eastern North America have their closest relatives in East Asia, but are otherwise absent from Europe or western North America. This distribution is best understood as a relict of the Arcto-Tertiary Geoflora, a plant assemblage that covered much of the Northern Hemisphere until the late Neogene, when climactic changes fragmented it. This is supported by fossil specimens of such plants being found in western Northern America, where they are no longer found in the modern day.

=== Other examples ===
- Chorioactis, a genus of fungi found only in select locales in the south-central United States, Japan, and Taiwan.
- Oxygyne, a genus of plants found in Japan and Cameroon.

== See also ==
- Ecological island
- Geographical isolation
- Habitat
- Habitat fragmentation
- Milesians
- Population fragmentation
