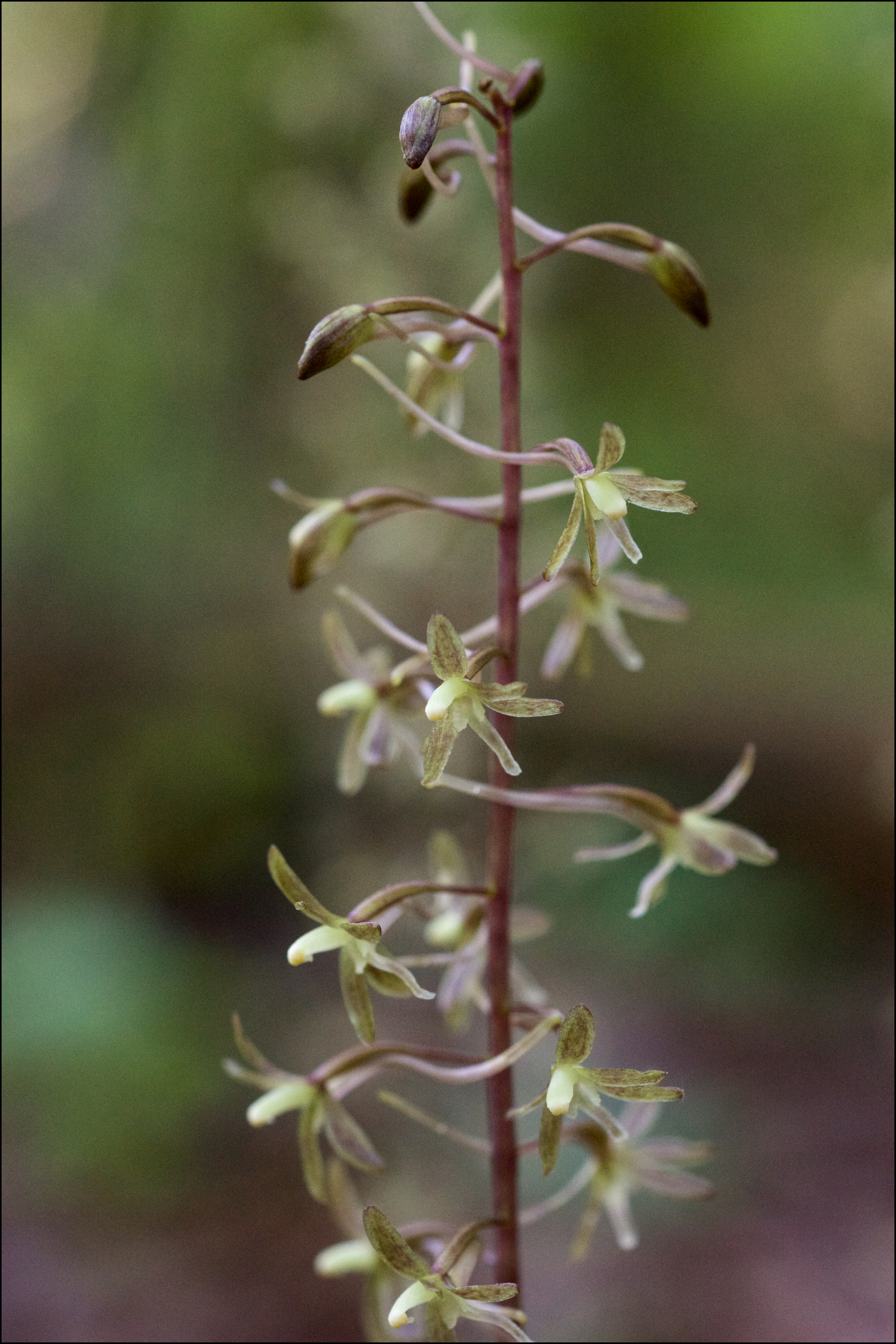

Conservation status
- Apparently Secure (NatureServe)

Scientific classification
- Kingdom: Plantae
- Clade: Tracheophytes
- Clade: Angiosperms
- Clade: Monocots
- Order: Asparagales
- Family: Orchidaceae
- Subfamily: Epidendroideae
- Genus: Tipularia
- Species: T. discolor

Binomial name
- Tipularia discolor (Pursh) Nuttall

Synonyms
- Orchis discolor Pursh; Plectrurus discolor (Pursh) Raf.; Tipularia unifolia Britton, Sterns & Poggenb.; Limodorum unifolium Muhl.

= Tipularia discolor =

Species of orchid

Tipularia discolor, the crippled cranefly or crane-fly orchid, is a perennial terrestrial woodland orchid, a member of the family Orchidaceae. It is the only species of the genus Tipularia found in North America. It occurs in the southeastern United States from Texas to Florida, the range extending north into the Ohio Valley and along the Appalachians as far north as the Catskills. There are also isolated populations in Massachusetts and in the Great Lakes region. Tipularia discolor is a common early pioneer during secondary succession, readily colonizing woodland habitats during early developmental or regrowth stages.

Tipularia discolor grows a single leaf in September that disappears in the spring. The leaf top is green, often with dark purple spots. The leaf underside is a striking purple color. The flower blooms in mid-July to late August. The roots are a connected series of edible corms. They are starchy and almost potato-like.

The plant is pollinated by noctuid moths, by means of flowers which incline slightly to the right or left, so the pollinaria can attach to one of the moth's compound eyes. The details of the inflorescence can be seen in a video recorded in State Botanical Gardens in Athens, GA .

Crane-fly orchids are endangered, threatened, or rare in several states.

== Description ==
Tipularia discolor is an orchid with a reddish brown stem and dull yellow to purplish brown weakly monosymmetric flowers. The leaves of the orchid are easily distinguished as they are ovate with a bright green adaxial surface (top) and a purple abaxial surface (bottom). In autumn, a single leaf emerges, which lasts throughout the winter. Then in the late spring to early summer all the leaves fall off and the orchid blooms. When the orchid flowers, no more leaves grow for the duration of the bloom (June – September). The flowering stalk grows 10–65 cm tall, standing erect. The stem is herbaceous, glabrous, and leafless. An individual T. discolor can have 2–5 subterranean corms.

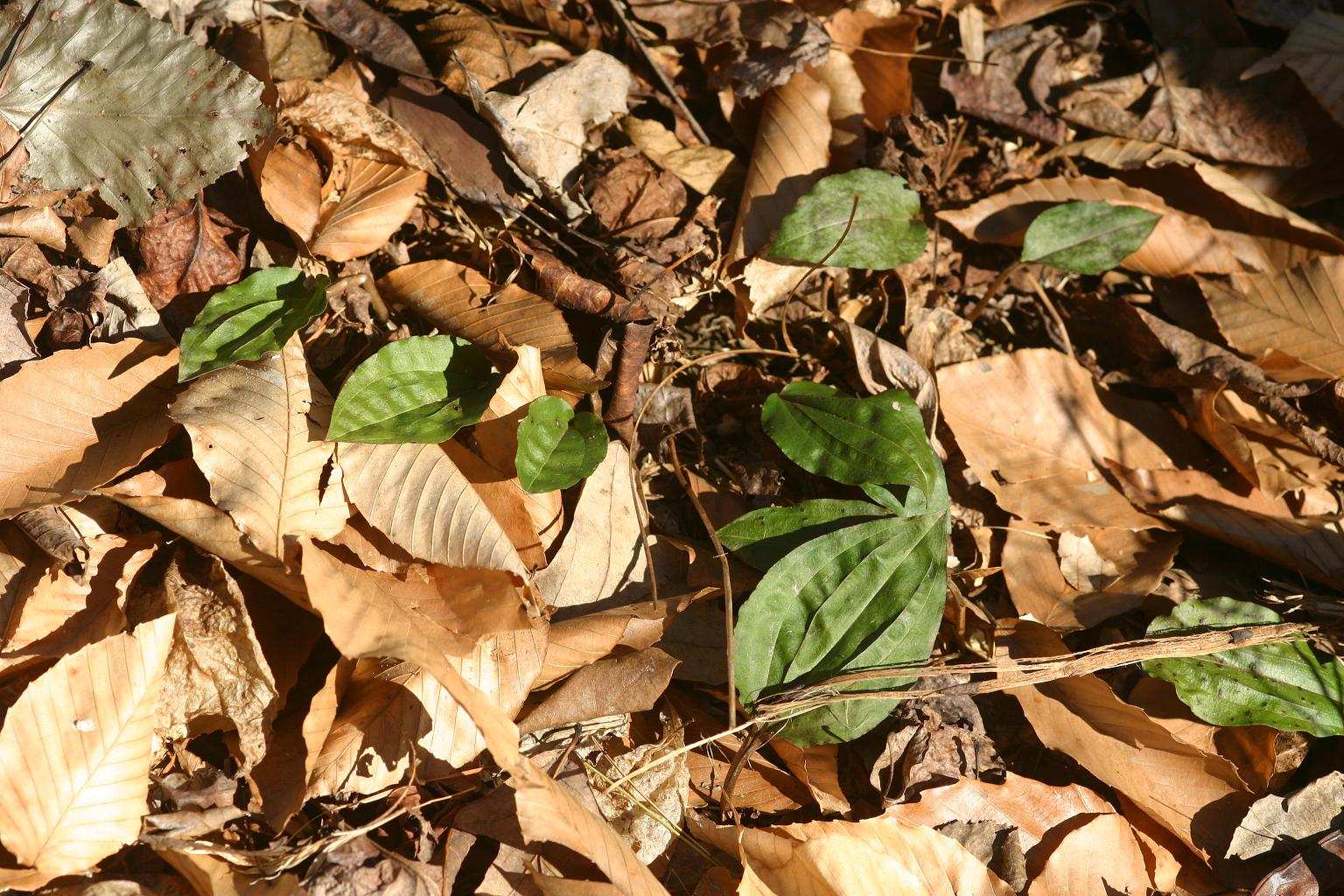
Clonal group

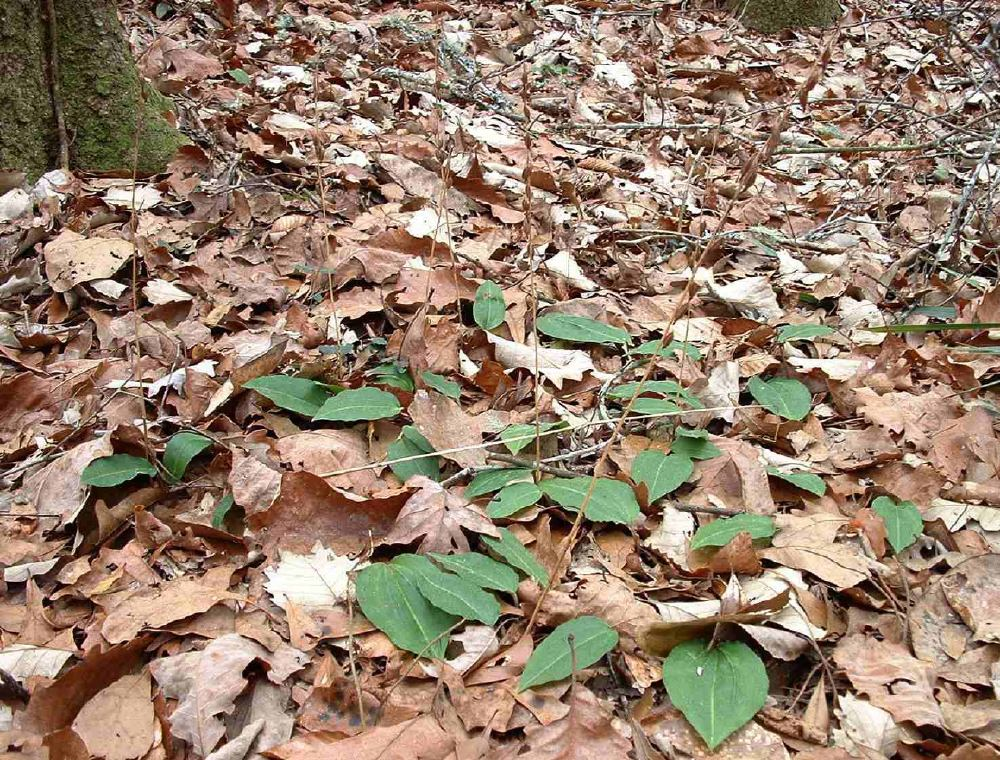
Colony, with seed pods, Florida, February.

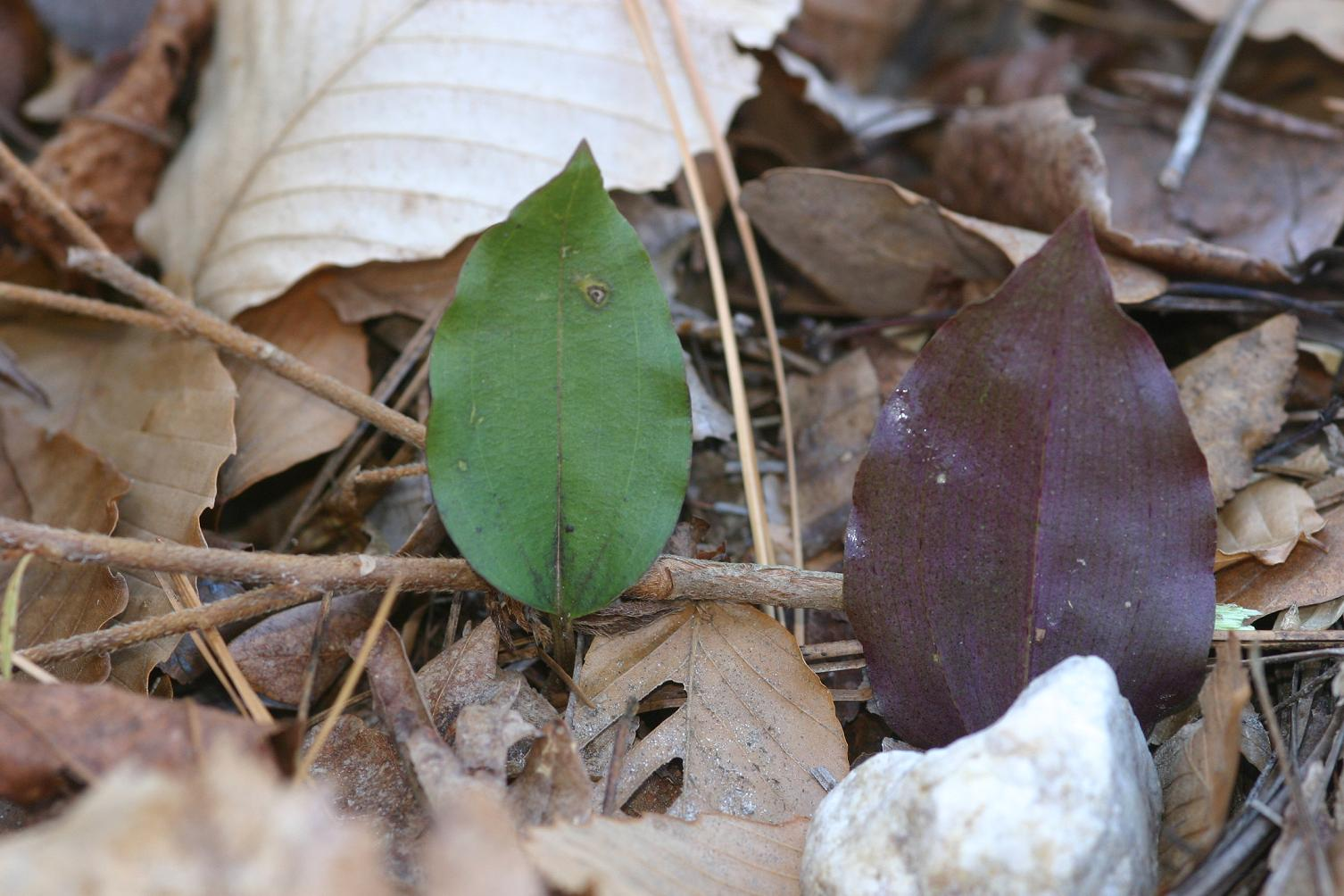
Purple underside of leaf

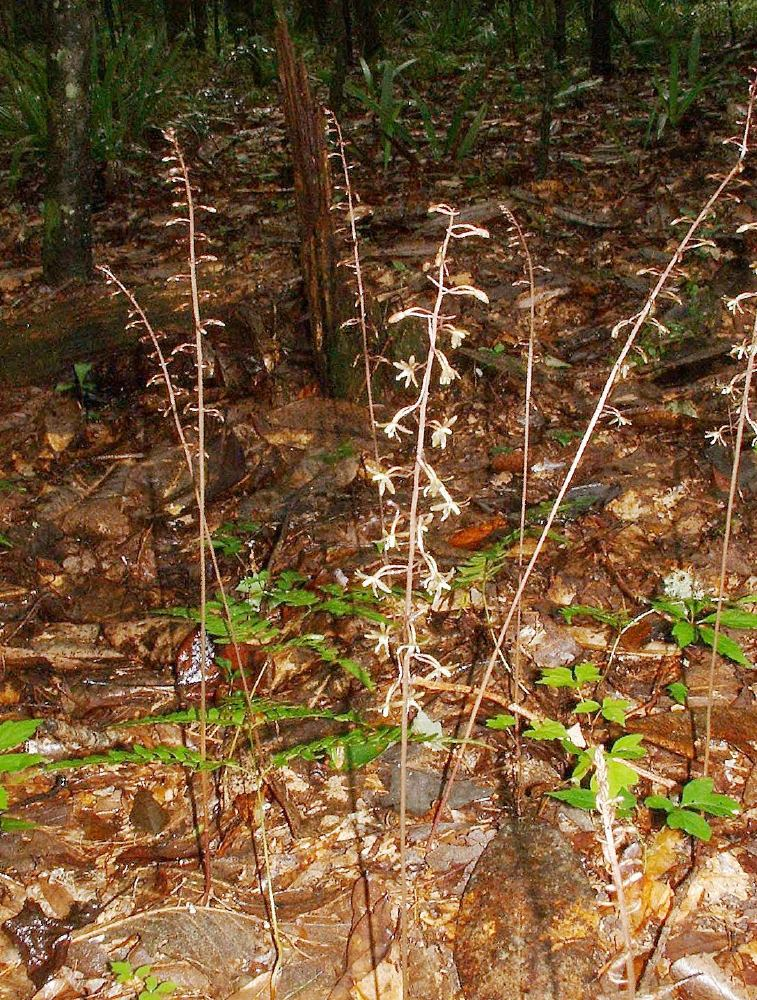
Flowers

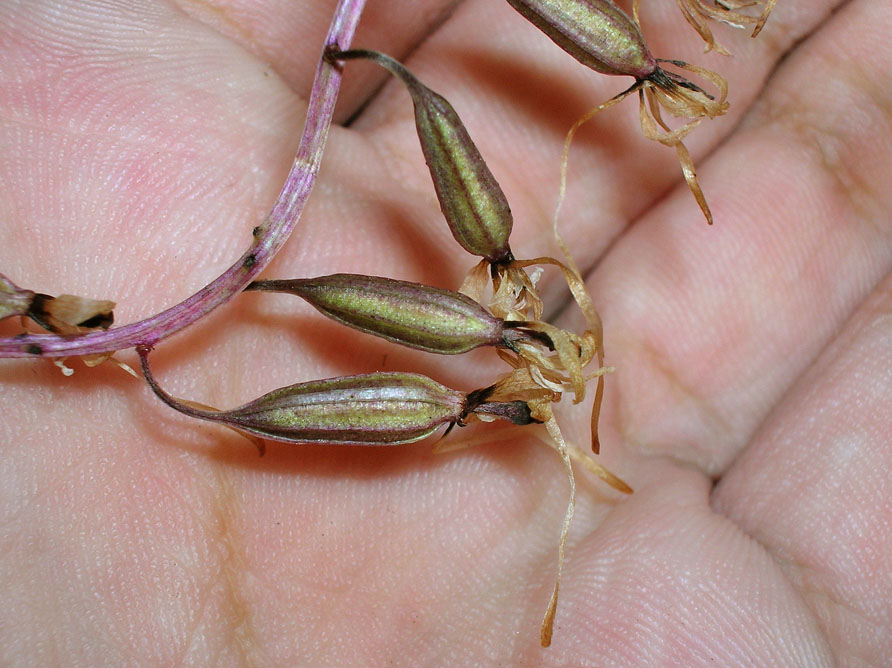
Seed pods

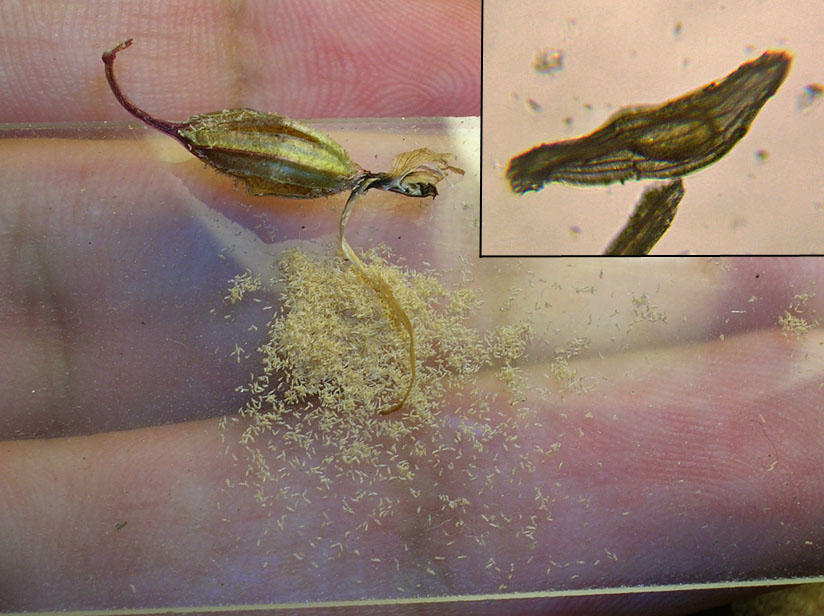
Broken seed pod with micrograph of seed insert.

== Taxonomy ==
Tipularia discolor belongs to the genus Tipularia, a group of terrestrial orchids that contains four other accepted species: T. japonica, T. josephi, T. odorata, and T. szechuanica. Tipularia discolor is the only one of these species that is found in North America. The plant resides in the family Orchidaceae, which is about 111 million years old.

Synonyms for Tipularia discolor include Tipularia unifolia, Limodorum unifolium, Orchis discolor, and Plectrurus discolor. The basionym for T. discolor is Orchis discolor.

== Distribution and habitat ==
Tipularia discolor is one of the most common orchids in North America, occurring in the majority of the southeastern United States, but is rare or even endangered in some of the central states. Its range extends from Texas to Florida and as far north as New Jersey, with isolated populations in New York and Ohio. Tipularia discolor can be found in deciduous forests and relies on humus-rich soils, a result of decaying trees, to germinate and develop.

== Uses ==
=== Pollinators and wildlife ===
Tipularia discolor uses a specialized type of pollination that requires a specific species of moth. The pollen of the plant is found in a special structure called a pollinium. Orchids have septal nectaries, which are nectaries that are embedded within the septae of an ovary. These are located at the unfused margins of the carpels. These nectaries are located within a nectar spur. When the moth lands on the plant and reaches into the flower with its proboscis to drink the nectar, the sticky pollinia sticks to the compound eye of the moth. The moth may then transfer pollinia to another flower for pollination. Tipularia discolor is pollinated by a single nocturnal pollinator, Pseudaletia unipuncta.

The leaves of the orchid can act as a food source for opportunistic herbivores such as deer, and some small mammals are known to feed on the corms as they are dense with nutrients.

=== Cultural ===
Tipularia is also the name of a botanical journal published once a year by the Georgia Botanical Society. The journal documents plants, locations, and people found in or related to Georgia botany. The society is made up of distinguished botanists, professors, knowledgeable amateurs, and students of botany. The oldest copy dates back to 1986.

== Etymology ==
The genus Tipularia is named after Tipuloidea, which is a superfamily containing all known species of crane fly. The flowers of species in this genus are said to look similar to crane flies. Hence, the common name of T. discolor: the crane fly orchid. The species name discolor refers to the top side of the single leaf formed by T. discolor being green while the bottom side of the leaf is purple.

== Ecology ==
The corms of Tipularia discolor contain a large concentration of non-structural carbohydrates. These provide the energy to drive new plant growth and reproductive processes.

Tipularia discolor is capable of tolerating dry, acidic soil. It has a strong reliance on mycorrhizal fungi in the early stages of development. This is because their small, nearly dust-like seeds are too small to store the amount of food reserves needed for a plant to develop properly. Mycorrhizal fungi are found in the protocorm of T. discolor to aid in germination. A recent study found that the mycorrhizal fungi found in these protocorms persist even after the plant grows and lessens its reliance on the mycorrhizal fungi.
