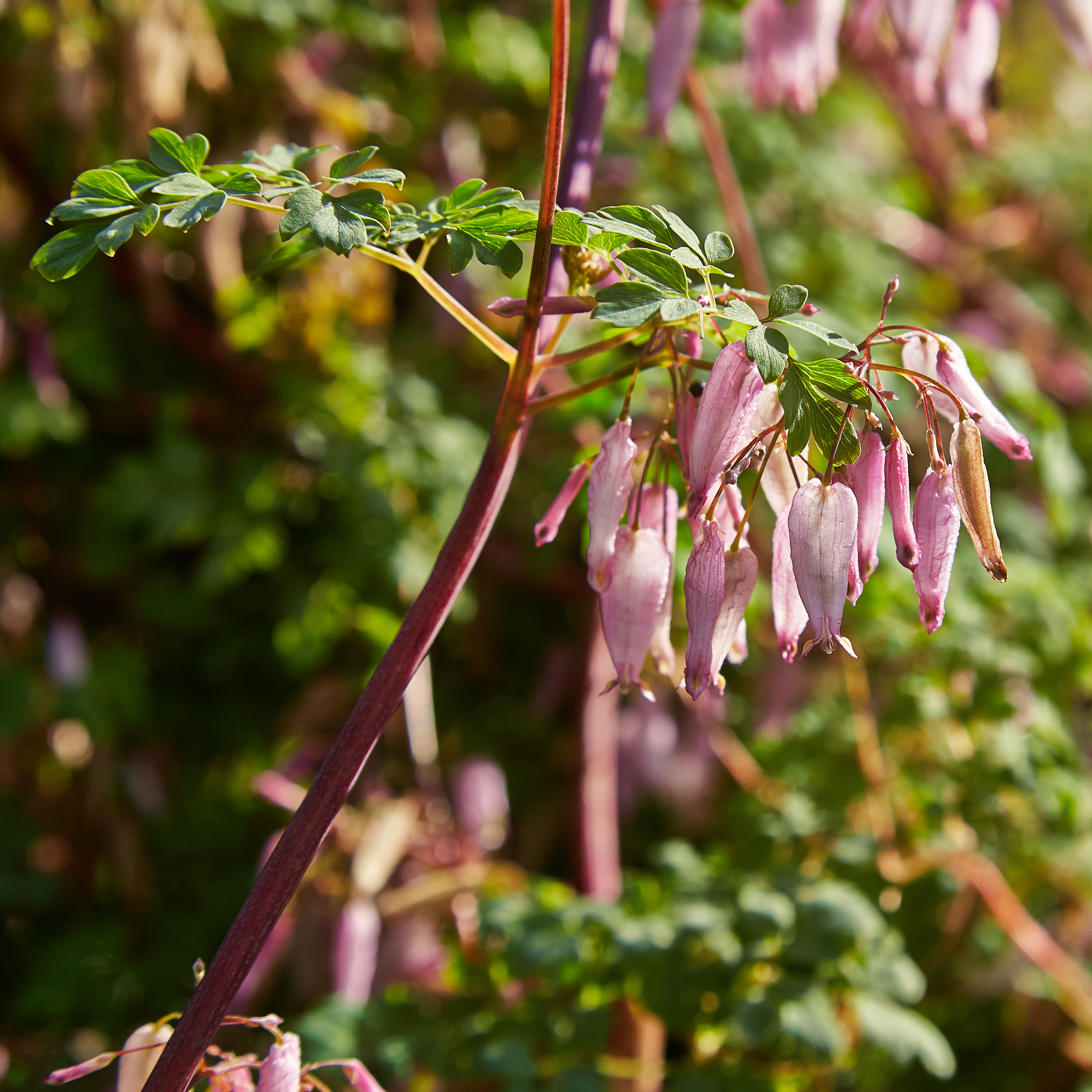

Conservation status
- Apparently Secure (NatureServe)

Scientific classification
- Kingdom: Plantae
- Clade: Embryophytes
- Clade: Tracheophytes
- Clade: Spermatophytes
- Clade: Angiosperms
- Clade: Eudicots
- Order: Ranunculales
- Family: Papaveraceae
- Genus: Adlumia
- Species: A. fungosa

Binomial name
- Adlumia fungosa (Aiton) Greene ex Britton, Sterns & Poggenb.

Synonyms
- Adlumia cirrhosa; Fumaria fungosa

= Adlumia fungosa =

Species of flowering plant in the poppy family

Adlumia fungosa is a species in the Papaveraceae that is commonly known as the Allegheny vine, climbing fumitory, or mountain fringe. It is a herbaceous, creeping, flowering plant and is closely related to the Fumitory genus, Fumaria.

Adlumia fungosa is a biennial climbing plant with very slender stems. The leaves are several times pinnately divided, prehensile, and feathery in texture. The white or pinkish flowers grow in large clusters and appear in summer. The plant grows on wet and wooded slopes, and is native to North America, particularly the Allegheny Mountains area. It is a threatened or endangered species throughout its range in northeastern North America, where it has not been completely extirpated. This vine can grow up to 12 feet (3.7 m) in length on wooded and rocky slopes.

The species name fungosa means 'spongy' in Latin.
