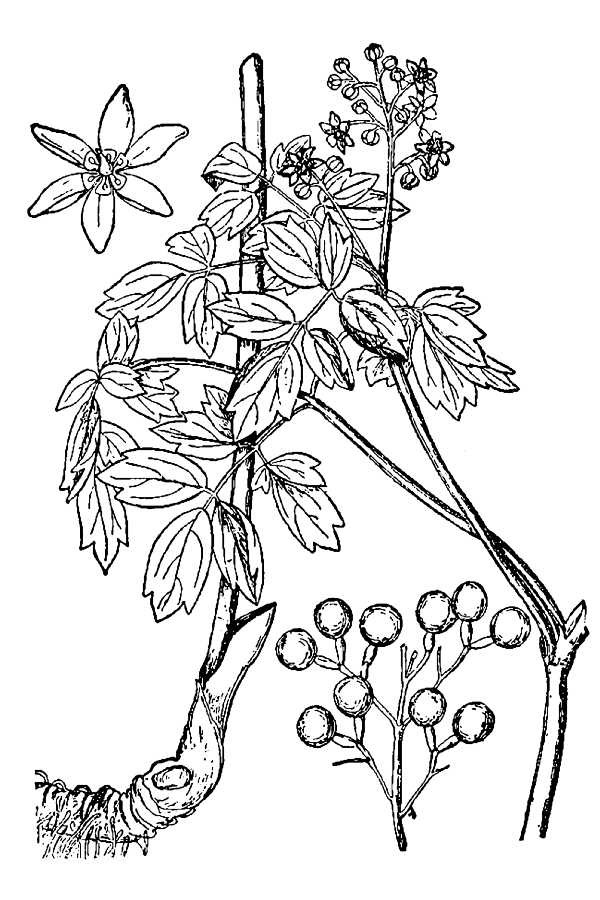
- Caulophyllum thalictroides from Britton & Brown 1913

Scientific classification
- Kingdom: Plantae
- Clade: Tracheophytes
- Clade: Angiosperms
- Clade: Eudicots
- Order: Ranunculales
- Family: Berberidaceae
- Genus: Caulophyllum; Michx.

Species
- Caulophyllum thalictroides; Caulophyllum robustum; Caulophyllum giganteum

= Caulophyllum =

Genus of flowering plants belonging to the barberry family

Caulophyllum is a small genus of perennial herbs belonging to the family Berberidaceae and closely related to the Eurasian genera Leontice and Gymnospermium. It is native to eastern Asia and eastern North America. These plants are distinctive spring wildflowers, which grow in moist, rich woodland, it is known for its large triple-compound leaf, and large blue, berry-like fruits. Unlike many spring wildflowers, it is not an ephemeral plant and persists throughout much of the summer. Common names for plants in this genus include blue cohosh, squaw root, and papoose root. As hinted at by its common names, this plant is well known as an alternative medicine for inducing childbirth and menstrual flow; it is also considered a poisonous plant.

== Description ==
These large, smooth plants (0.3–0.9 m tall) have a single to few stems with each stem bearing normally one, but on large stems two, large triple-compound leaves which the casual observer might assume to be several smaller leaves arranged on three separate branches. Each leaflet ends in three to five distinct tips. Plants produce underground stems called rhizomes that give rise to the leaves each spring and in the fall when the foliage dies back a scar is left on the rhizome and a new bud is formed that will grow into the foliage next spring. Plants are long lived and can live for more than 50 years. They are found in wooded locations with moisture retentive soils.

In April or May, each mature stem bears a spike of flowers. Each flower has six petal-like sepals which range from greenish-yellow to purple. The different rates of maturity between the stamens and the pistil ensure cross pollination. There are six fleshy nectar glands at the base of each sepal which attract pollinators. Each fertilized flower matures into a large (1 cm) deep-blue berry-like fruit which houses two bitter seeds. The large seeds are covered with a characteristic blue coat, and the fruits remain on the plants until fall. Seed germination can take a few years, and the seedlings are hypogeal, with the cotyledons remaining underground after germination and seedling emergence. The seedlings need a few years of growth before they are large enough to flower.

== Species ==
All species in this genus are very similar. Until recently, this genus was considered to be composed of only two species, however the Flora of North America recognizes Caulophyllum giganteum, as a distinct species rather than a subspecies of Caulophyllum thalictroides. Caulophyllum giganteum is slightly larger, has a more northerly (but overlapping) distribution, and blooms two weeks earlier than Caulophyllum thalictroides. Caulophyllum giganteum also has fewer flowers, that are consistently purplish.

- Caulophyllum thalictroides – Blue cohosh (E. North America)
- Caulophyllum giganteum – Giant blue cohosh (E. North America)
- Caulophyllum robustum – Asian blue cohosh (Japan, E. Asia)

== Uses ==
Caulophyllum species have been used for various (mainly medicinal) purposes from early times. The three species in the genus are generally considered to possess similar properties. This plant is occasionally used in woodland gardens as an ornamental. Children should not be allowed to eat the attractive blue fruits, as these plants contain chemicals that are known to cause cell damage. The powdered roots have been shown to cause dermatitis and irritation of the mucous membranes.

=== Food ===
Historically, the roasted seeds have been used as a coffee substitute; this beverage does not contain caffeine.

=== Medicine ===
Historically the root of Caulophyllum has been used as a medicine for: cancer, internal parasites, smooth muscle function, spasms, diuretic, menstruation, and childbirth. It is best known for the latter two uses. Various Native American tribes are also recorded as having used this plant for similar medicinal purposes. While no current widely marketed medicines are based on this plant, modern herbalists and practitioners of alternative medicine still utilize this plant as a natural therapy. Research on the medicinal potentials of this plant are ongoing.

== Gallery ==
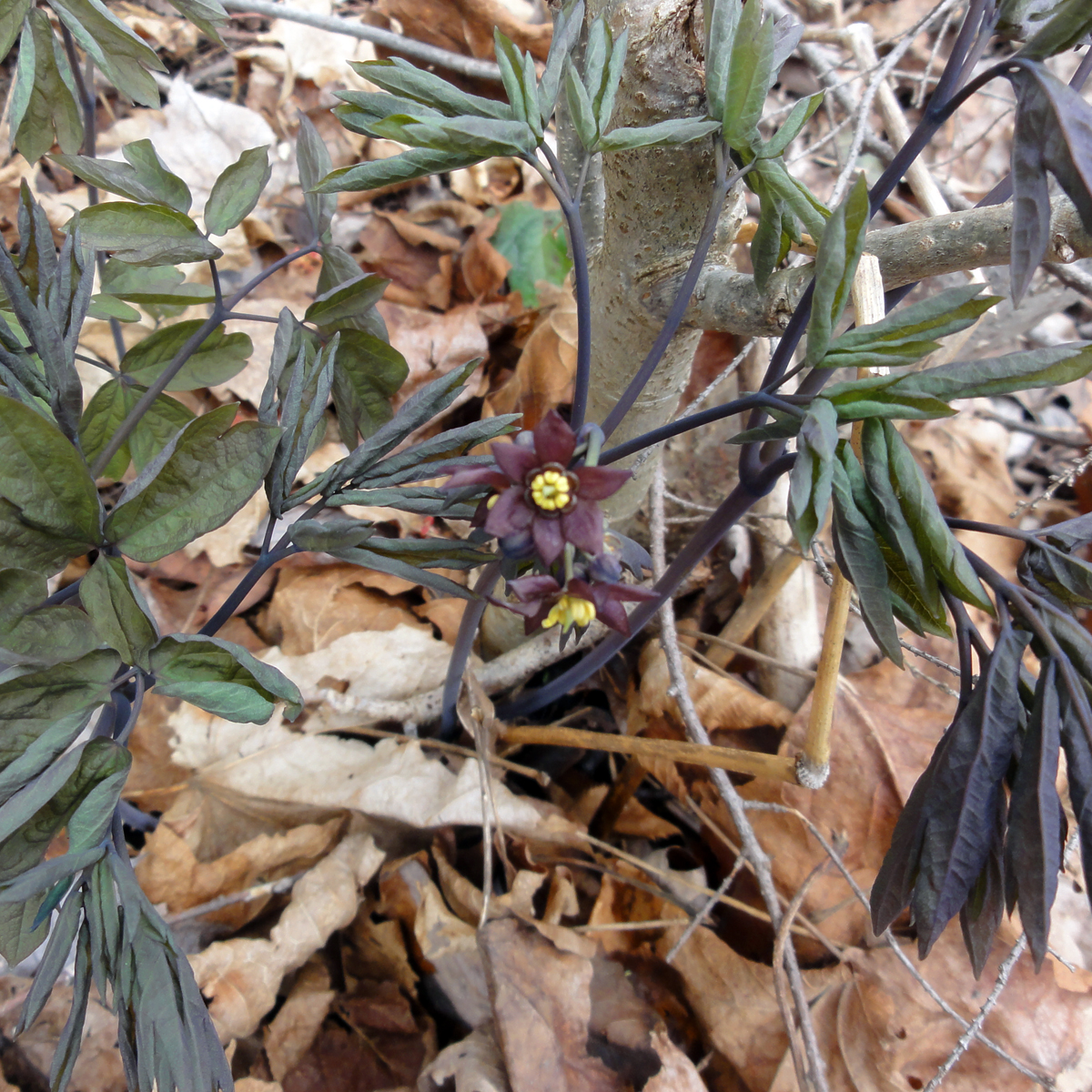
C. giganteum, young foliage and flower
