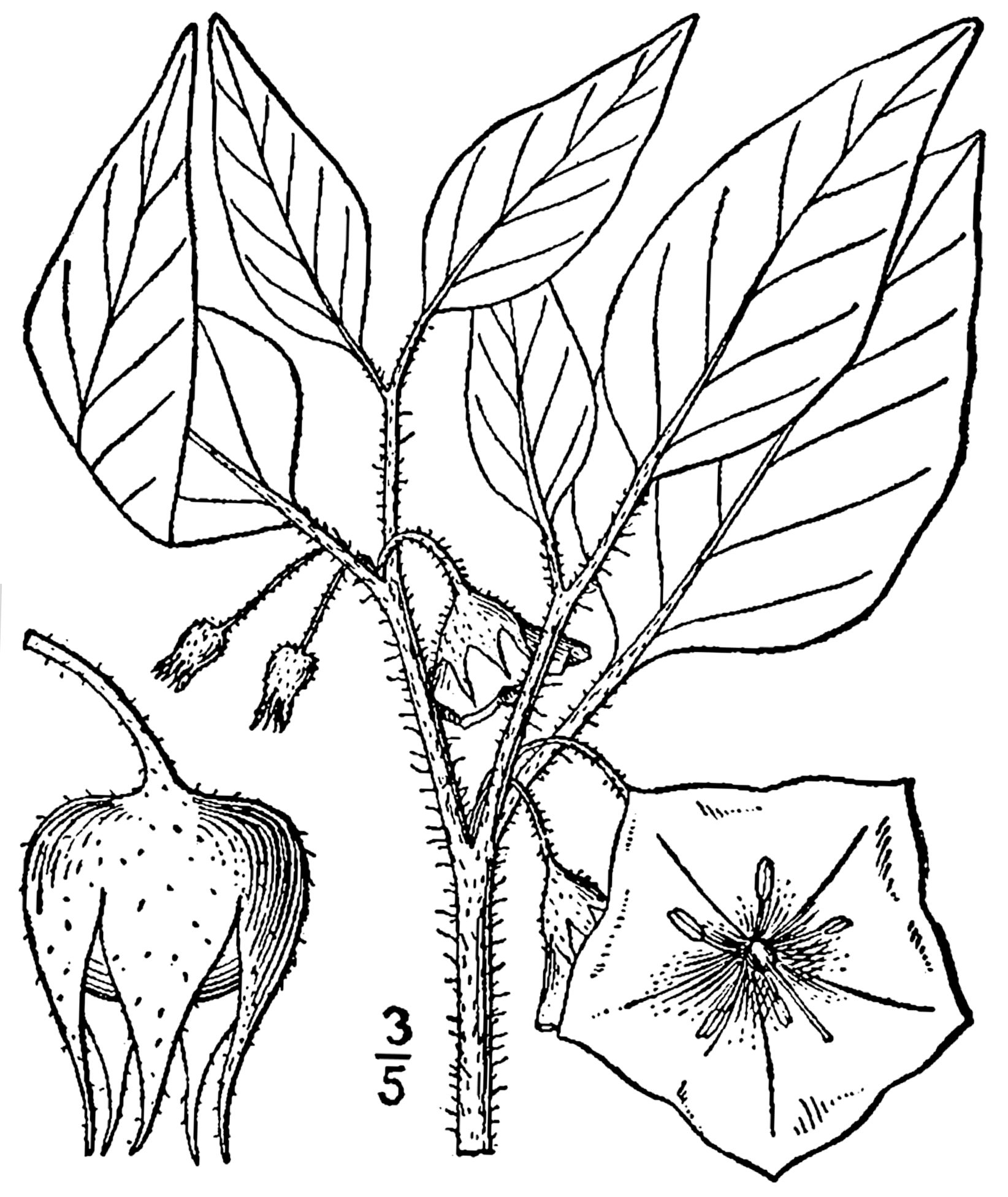
- Leucophysalis grandiflora BB-1913

Scientific classification
- Kingdom: Plantae
- Clade: Embryophytes
- Clade: Tracheophytes
- Clade: Spermatophytes
- Clade: Angiosperms
- Clade: Eudicots
- Clade: Asterids
- Order: Solanales
- Family: Solanaceae
- Genus: Leucophysalis; Rydb.

= Leucophysalis =

Genus of plants

Leucophysalis is a genus of flowering plants belonging to the family Solanaceae.

Its native range is Canada to Western and Northern USA.

Species:

- Leucophysalis grandiflora (Hook.) Rydb.
- Leucophysalis nana (A.Gray) Averett
