= Arcto-Tertiary Geoflora =

Hypothesized group of prehistoric plant species covering the northern hemisphere

The Arcto-Tertiary Geoflora (Note: This designation has as a part of it a term, 'Tertiary', that is now discouraged as a formal geochronological unit by the International Commission on Stratigraphy.) is a hypothesized floral assemblage that once covered the Northern Hemisphere, from roughly the late Mesozoic to mid Cenozoic Eras.

== Origins ==
First proposed by the paleobotanists J.S. Gardner and C. Ettinghausen in 1879, the concept was intended to answer questions about the disjunct distribution of identical or closely related plant species: for instance, magnolia and tulip trees are native to both the Southeast United States and southern China and Indochina.

As envisioned, the ATG had a wide distribution when the global climate was much warmer than it is currently, a situation strengthened by the closer position of some of the continents in late Mesozoic to early Cenozoic times. With the onset of global cooling and the Ice Ages, the ranges of these tropical to subtropical species were left in isolated pockets of warmer climates.

The southern, more tropical equivalent of the ATG was the Neotropical Tertiary Geoflora.
