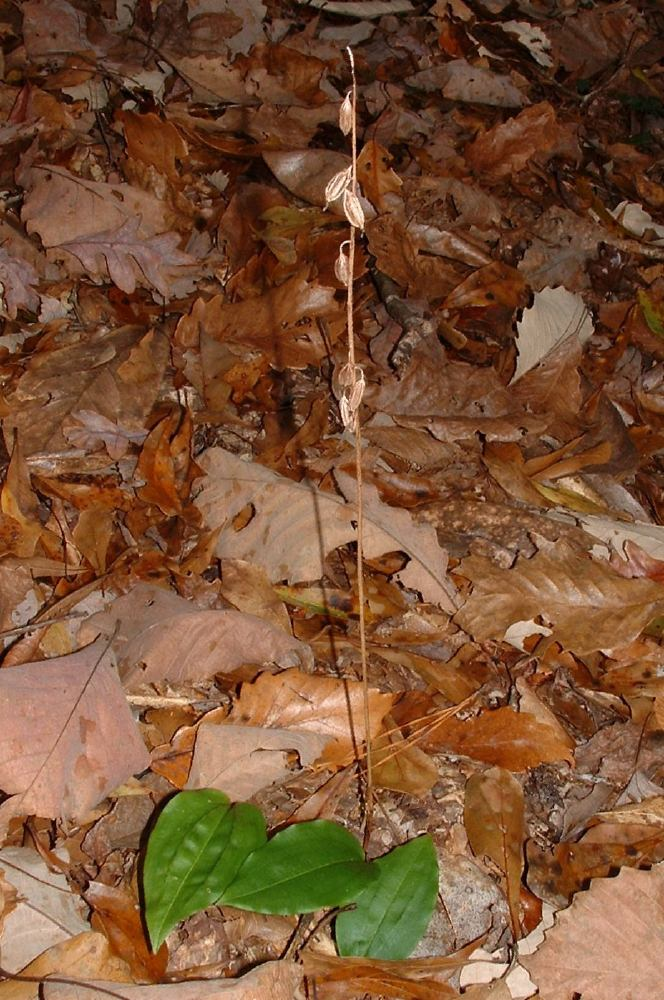
- Tipularia discolor, with seed pods

Scientific classification
- Kingdom: Plantae
- Clade: Tracheophytes
- Clade: Angiosperms
- Clade: Monocots
- Order: Asparagales
- Family: Orchidaceae
- Subfamily: Epidendroideae
- Tribe: Epidendreae
- Subtribe: Calypsoinae
- Genus: Tipularia; Nutt.

Synonyms
- Anthericlis Raf.; Plectrurus Raf.; Didiciea King & Prain

= Tipularia =

Genus of orchids

Tipularia is a genus of temperate terrestrial orchids (family Orchidaceae). As of December 2025, Plants of the World Online accepts the following species:

- Tipularia discolor (Pursh) Nutt.
- Tipularia japonica Matsum.
- Tipularia josephi Rchb.f. ex Lindl.
- Tipularia odorata Fukuy.
- Tipularia szechuanica Schltr.
