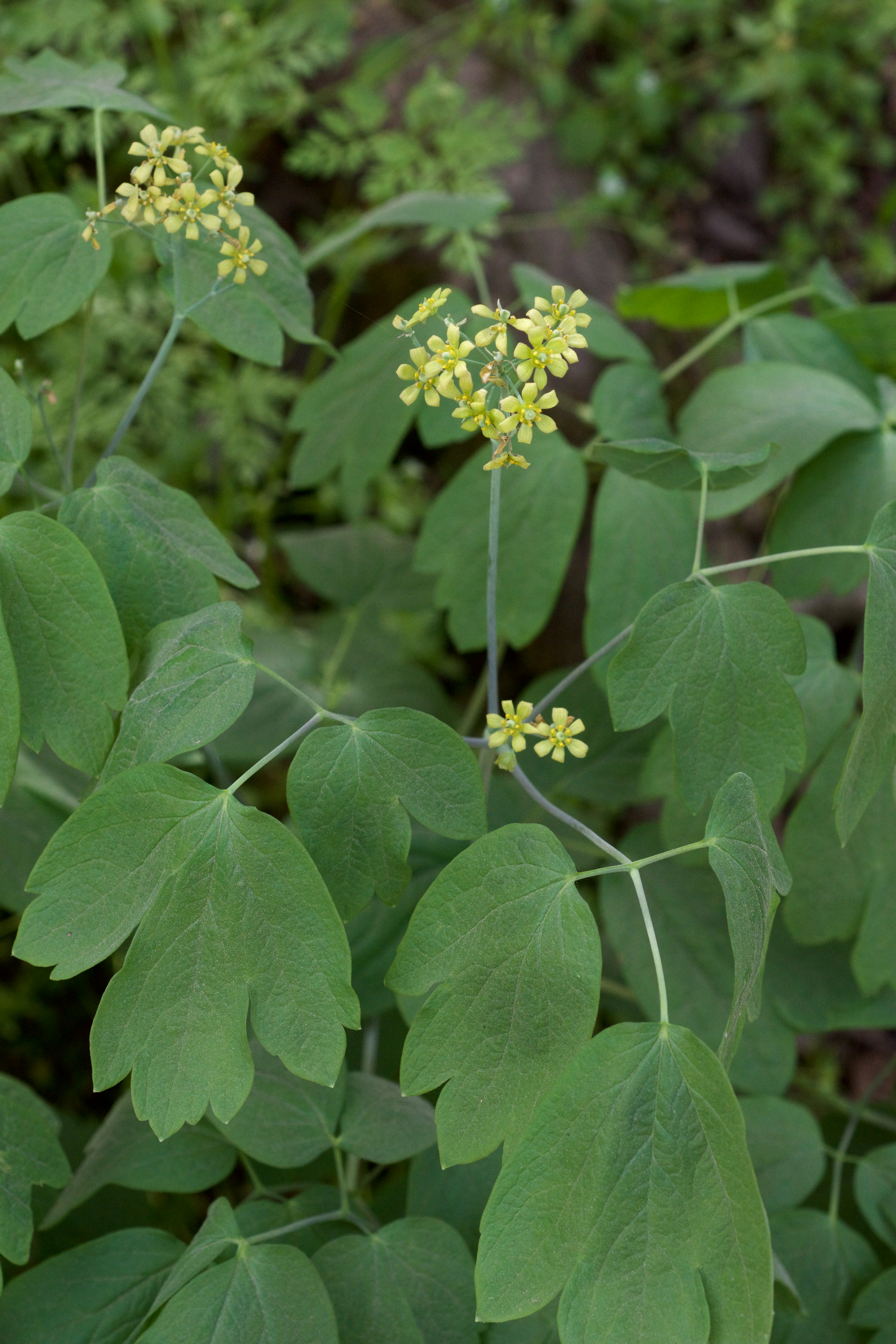

Scientific classification
- Kingdom: Plantae
- Clade: Tracheophytes
- Clade: Angiosperms
- Clade: Eudicots
- Order: Ranunculales
- Family: Berberidaceae
- Genus: Caulophyllum
- Species: C. thalictroides

Binomial name
- Caulophyllum thalictroides (L.) Michx.

= Caulophyllum thalictroides =

Species of flowering plant

Caulophyllum thalictroides, the blue cohosh, is a species of flowering plant in the Berberidaceae (barberry) family. It is a medium-tall perennial with blue berry-like fruits and bluish-green foliage. The common name cohosh is probably from an Algonquian word meaning "rough". The Greek-derived genus name Caulophyllum signifies "stem-leaf", while the specific name thalictroides references the similarity between the large highly divided, multiple-compound leaves of meadow-rues (Thalictrum spp.) and those of blue cohosh.

== Description ==
From the single stalk rising from the ground, there springs a single, large, three-branched leaf, giving rise to a yellow-flowered inflorescence, followed by bluish berries, coated with a glaucous, waxy bloom, somewhat similar in appearance to sloes. The bluish-green leaflets are three-lobed and entire at the base, but serrate at the tip.

== Habitat and distribution ==
The plant is found in hardwood forests and favors moist coves and hillsides, generally in shady locations, in rich soil. It grows in eastern North America, from Manitoba and Oklahoma east to the Atlantic Ocean.

== Pollination ==
The plant is pollinated early in the season by certain bee species, which are attracted by the nectar glands present on the petals.

== Uses ==
The plant has been used as a medicinal herb by American Indians. Many Native American tribes, and later European herbologists and mid-wives, would use this herb in conjunction with other herbs and fluids for abortive and contraceptive purposes.

The seeds have also reportedly been used a coffee substitute.

== Gallery ==
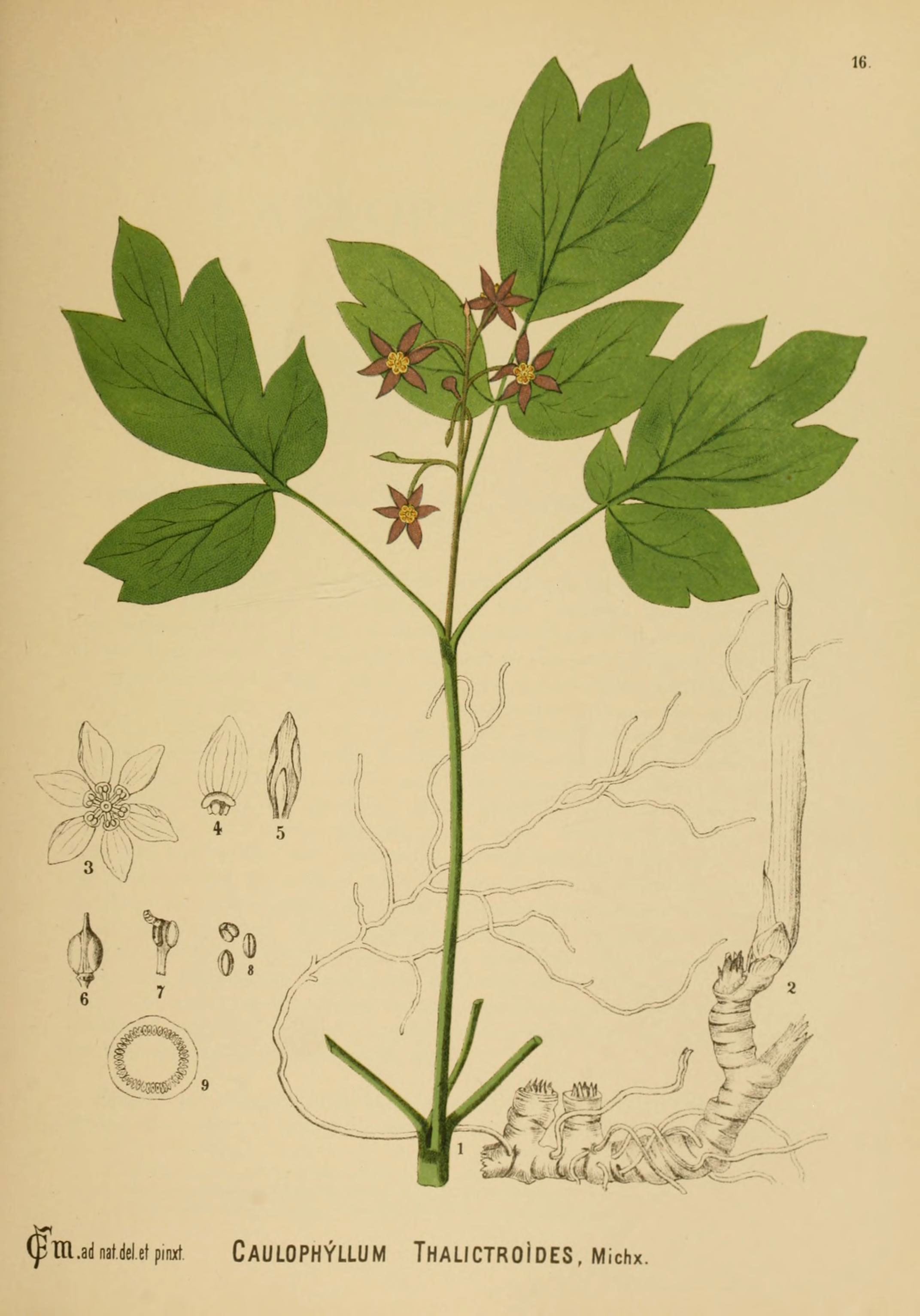
Colored plate from Millspaugh’s American Medical Plants showing anatomical detail of flower and creeping rhizome

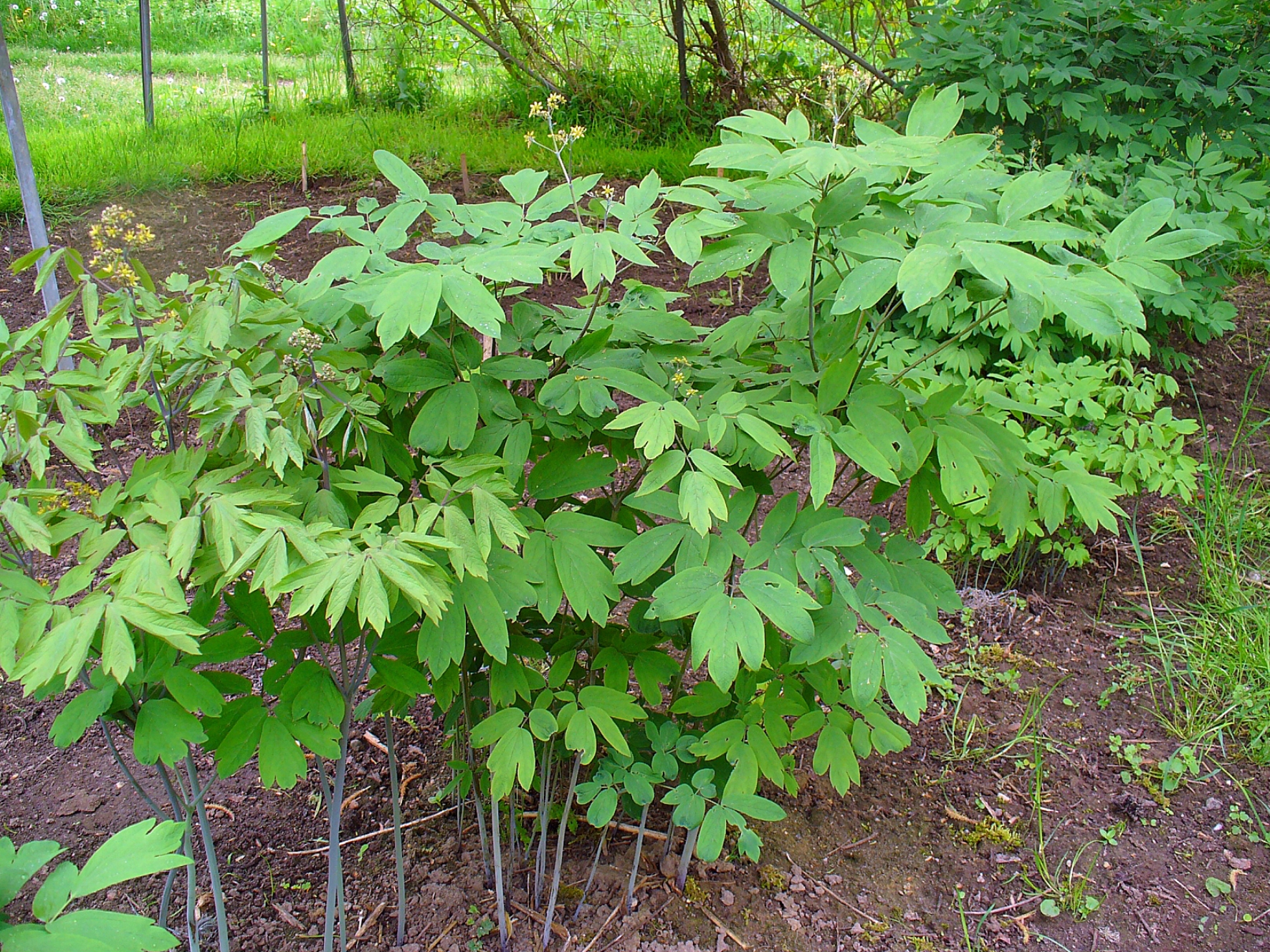
Mature clump of plant

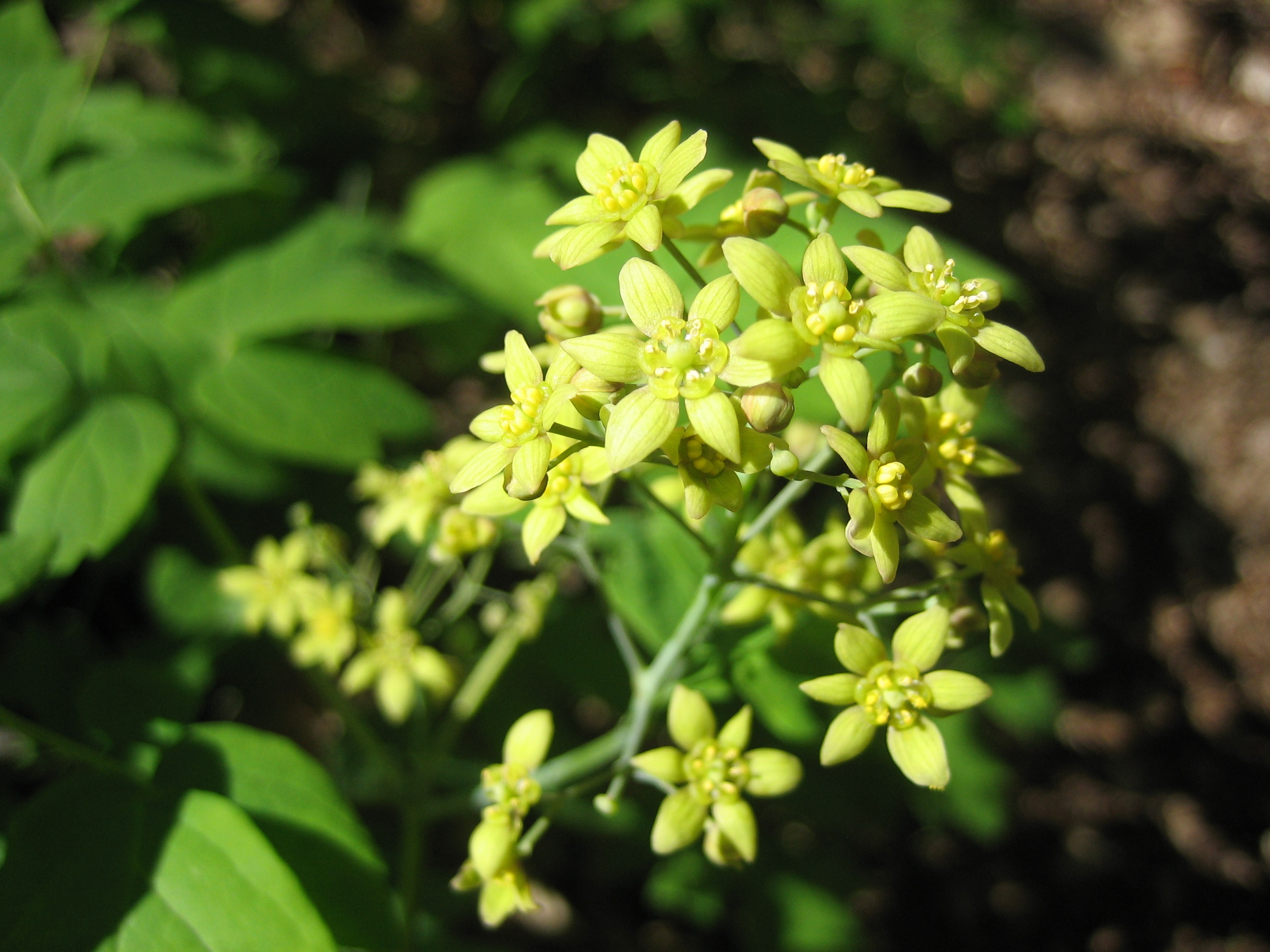
Inflorescence of green-flowered form

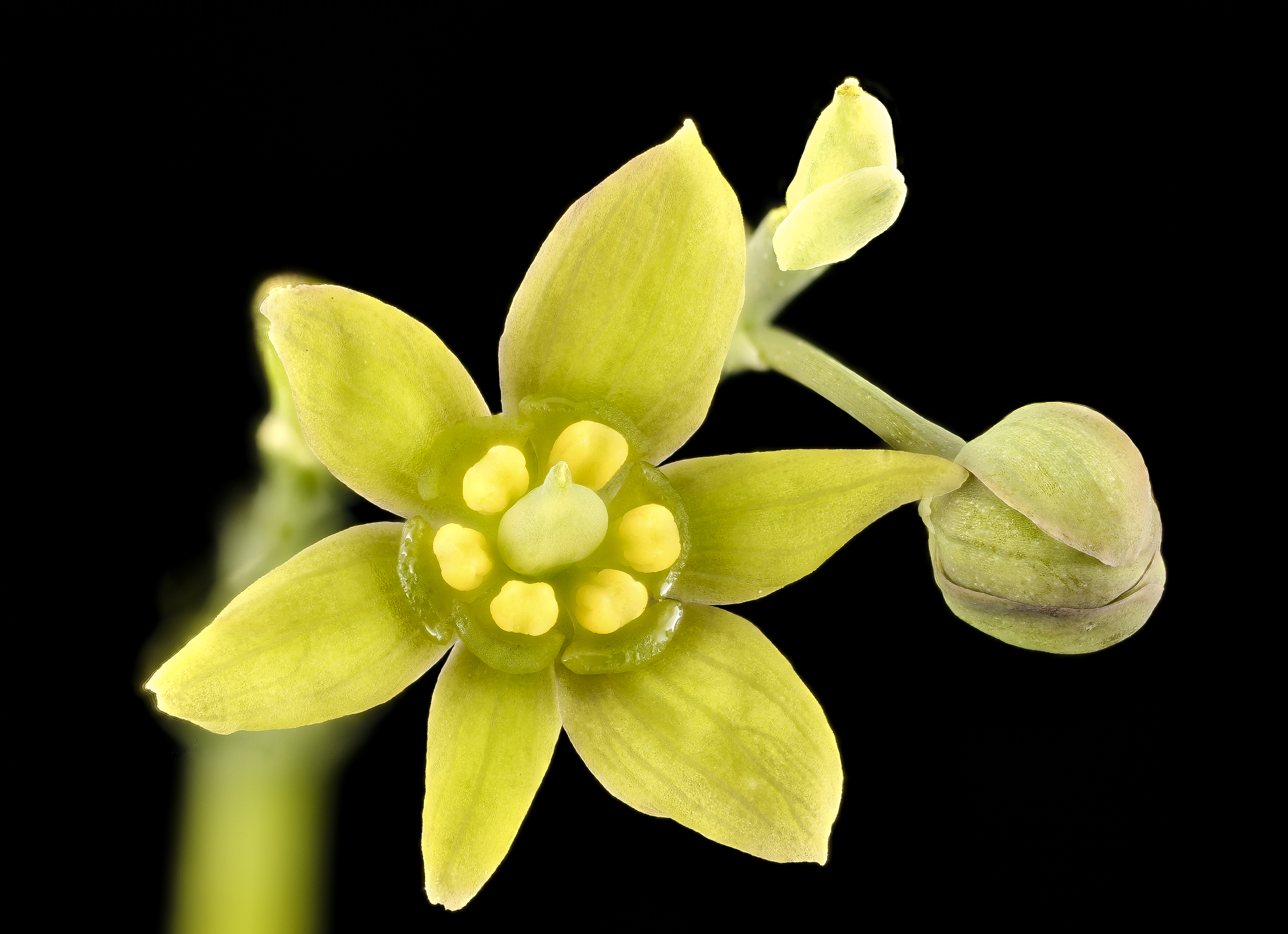
Close-up of single flower and flower bud (green-flowered form)

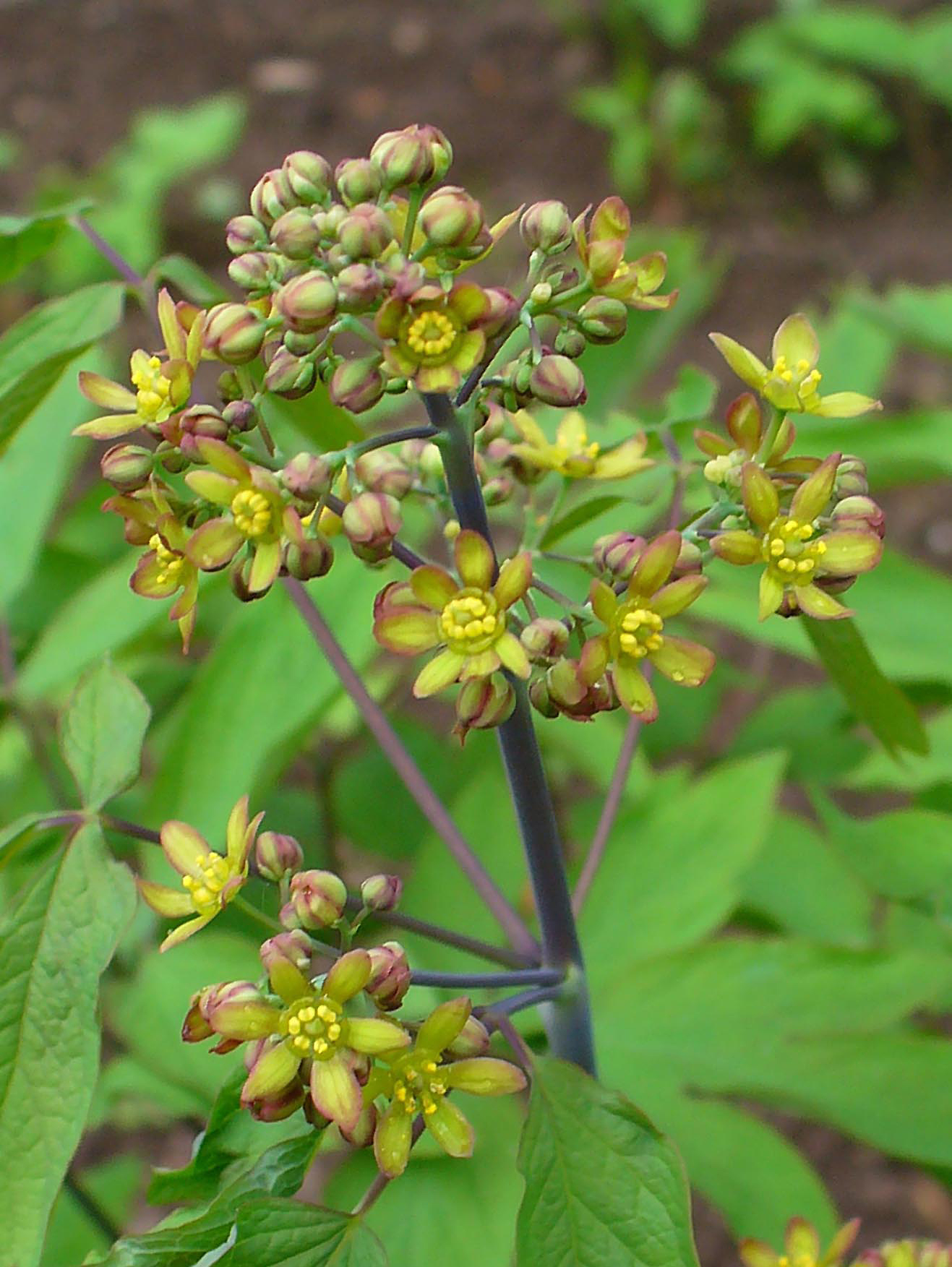
Inflorescence of purplish-green-flowered form

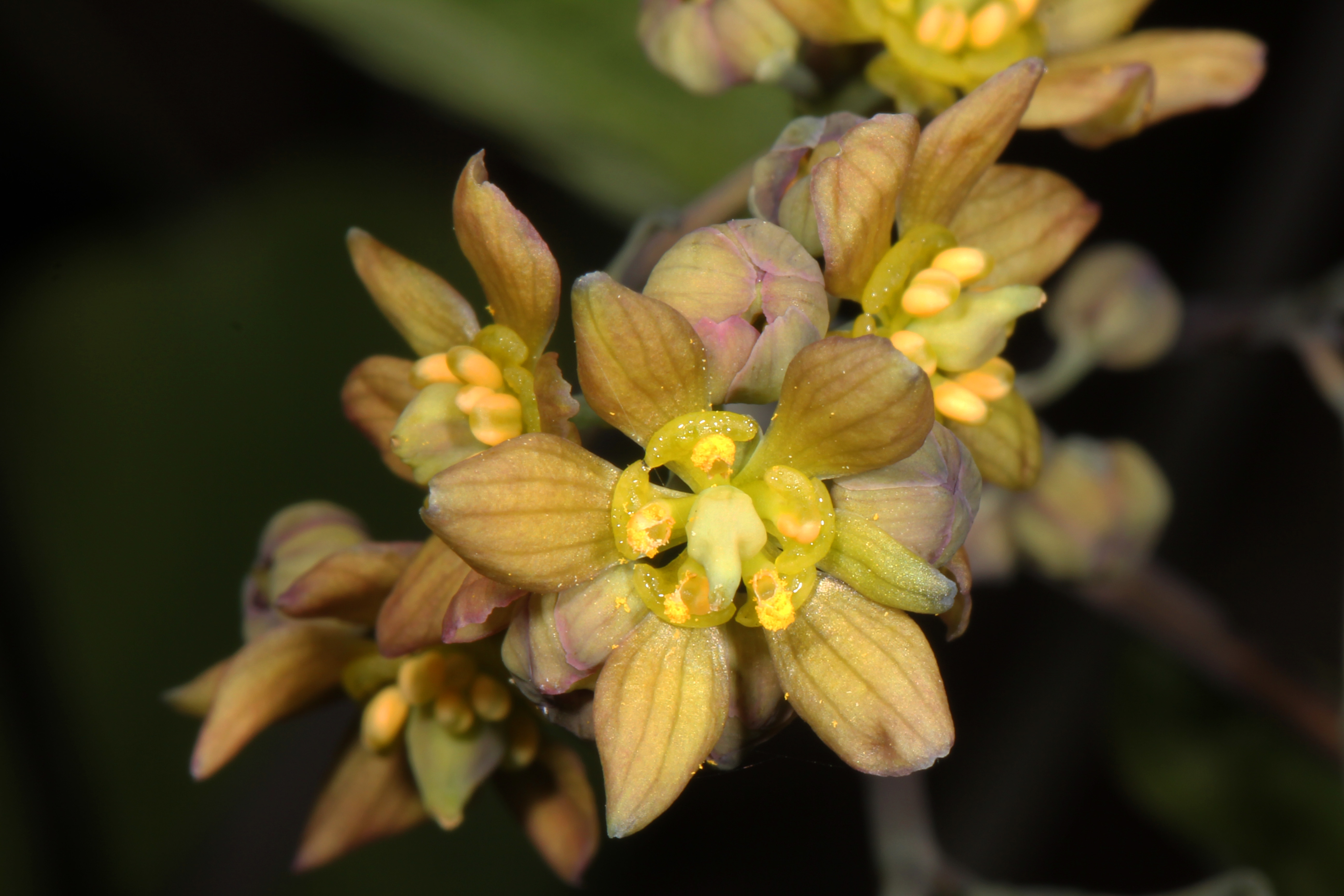
Detail of inflorescence of purplish-green-flowered form, showing single flower full-face

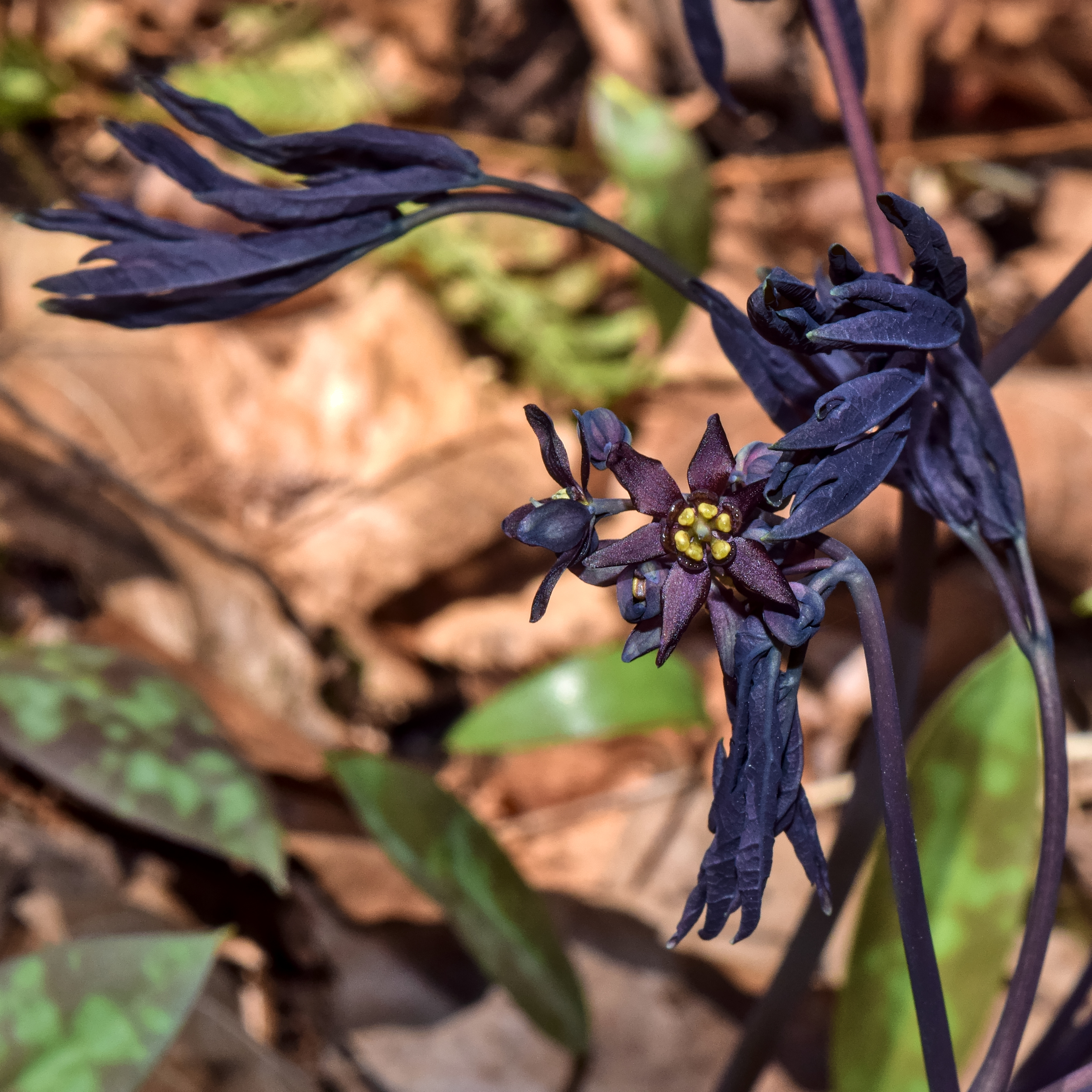
Young, flowering shoot of deep-purple-flowered form (leaves still tightly furled)

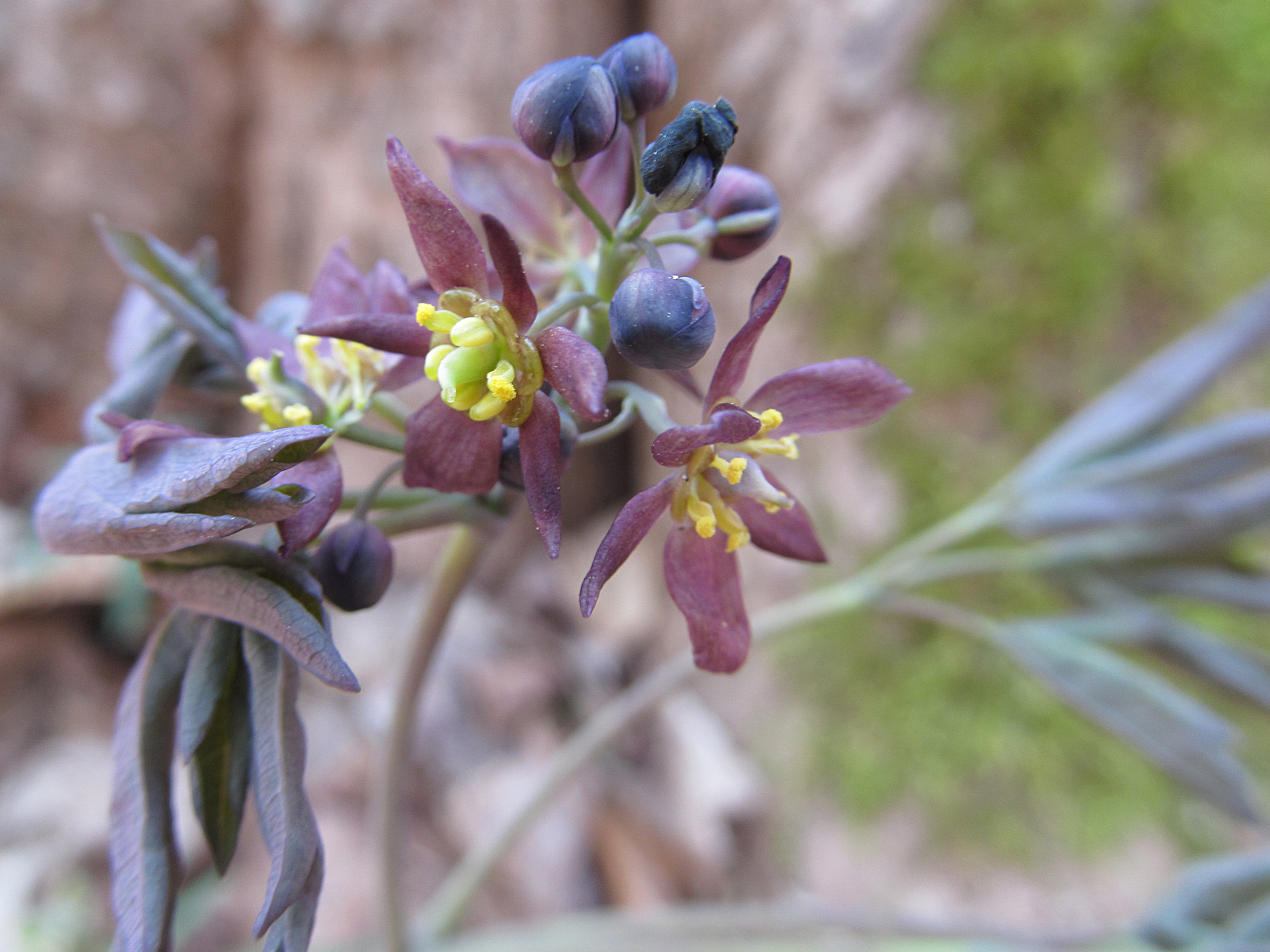
Lateral view of young inflorescence of purple-flowered form (flowers three-quarter-face)

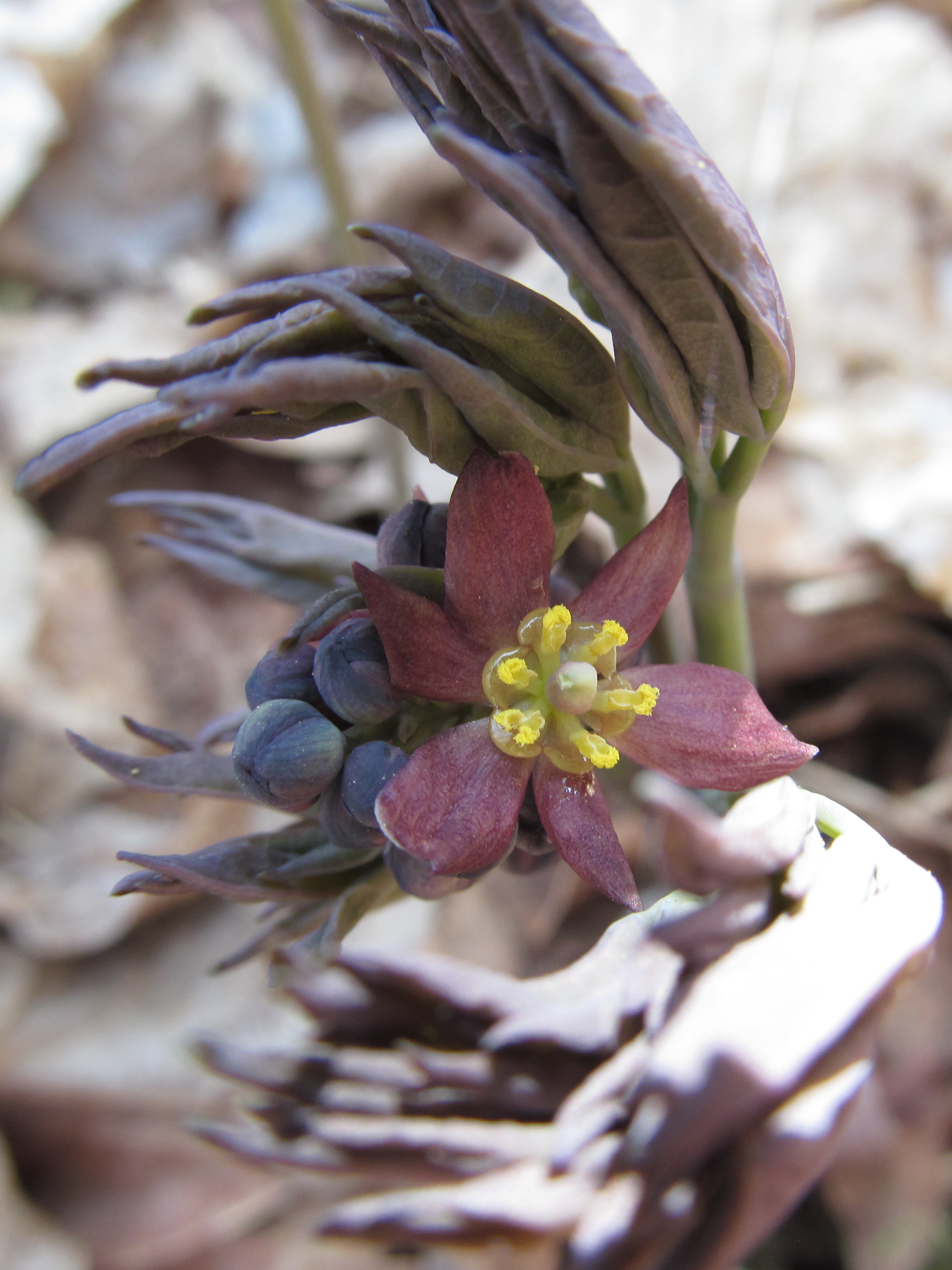
Single flower (full-face), flower buds and still furled young foliage of purple-flowered form

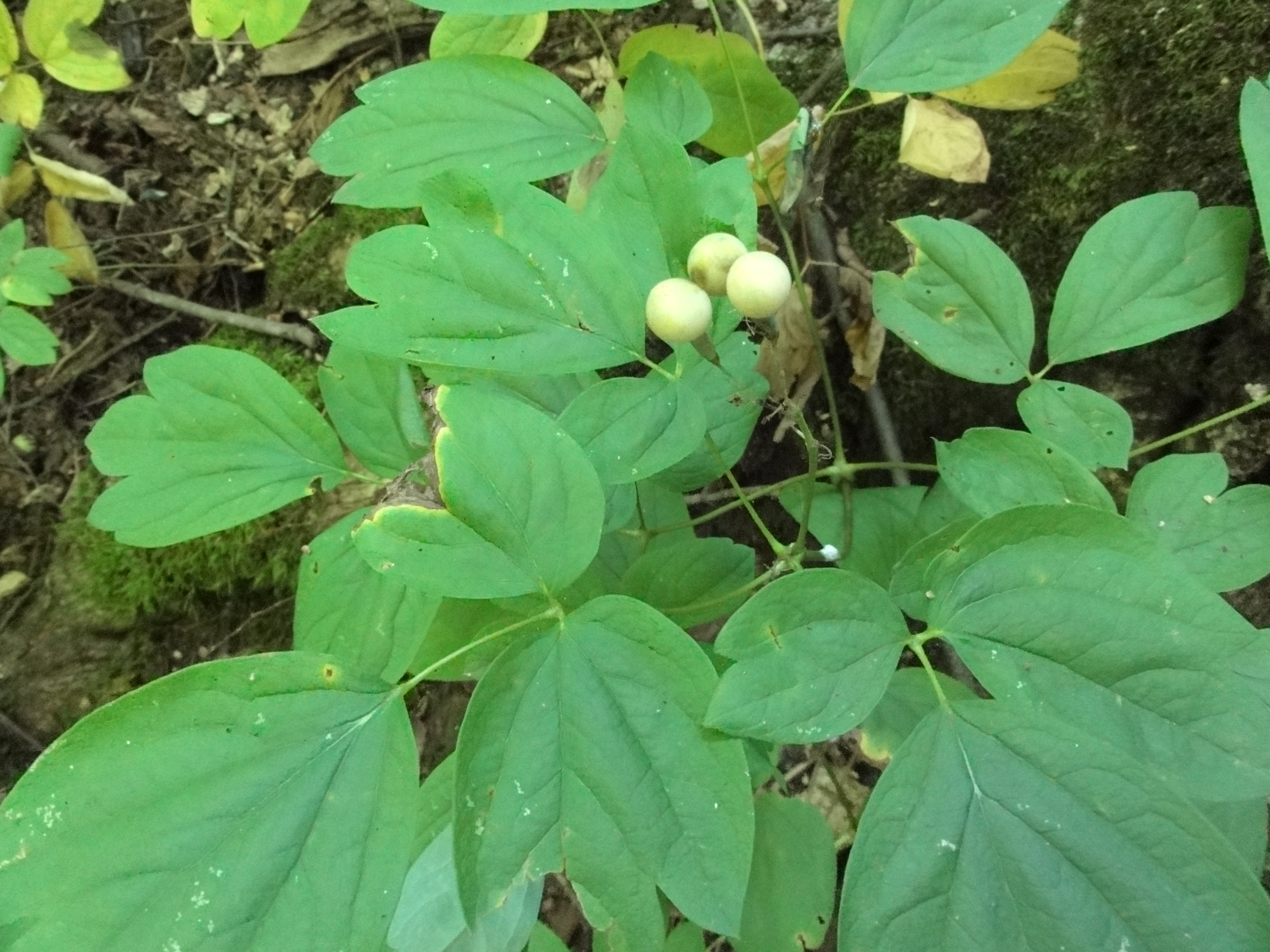
Unripe berries and mature foliage

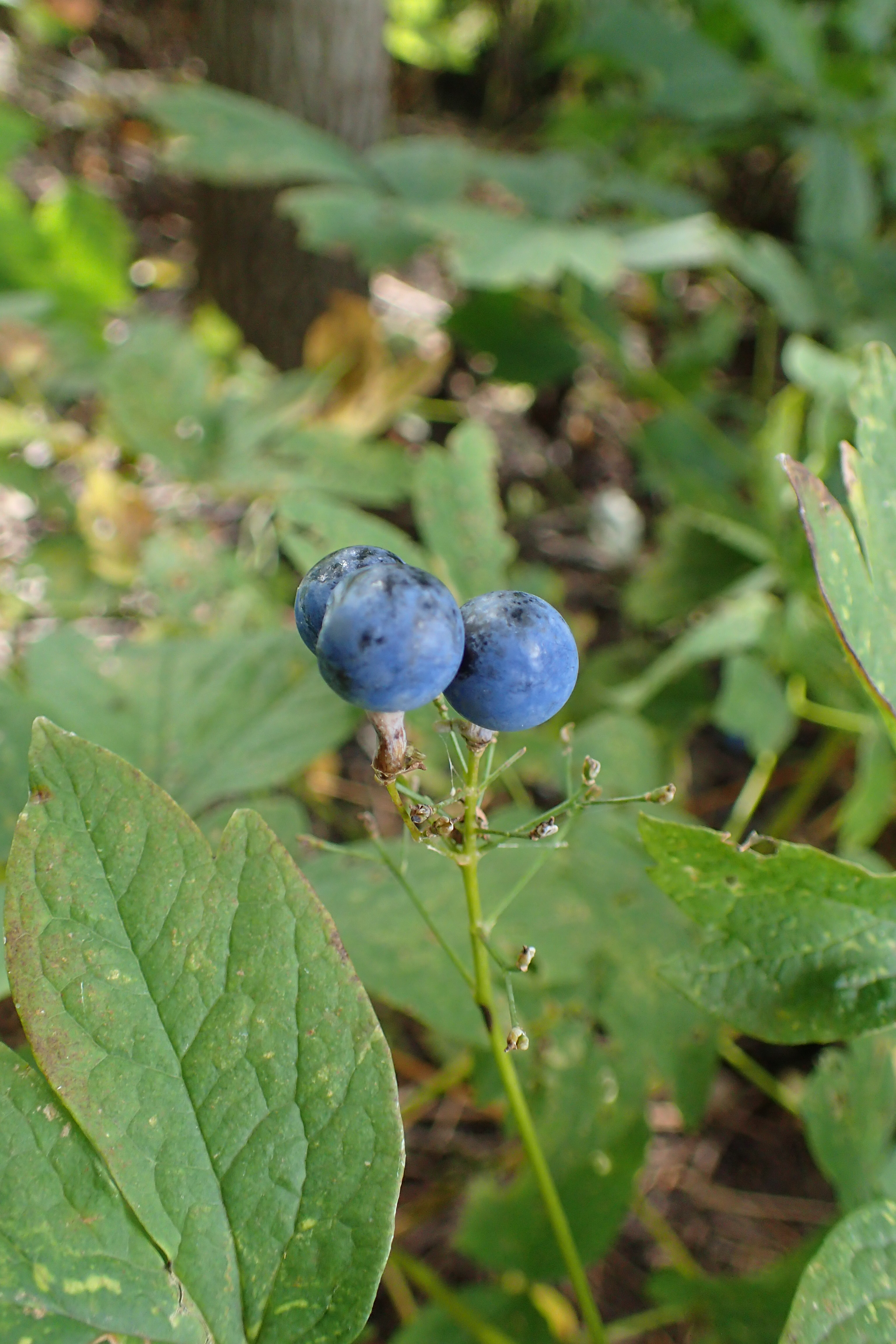
Infructescence, bearing three ripe berries and many tiny, green, undeveloped fruit (lateral view)

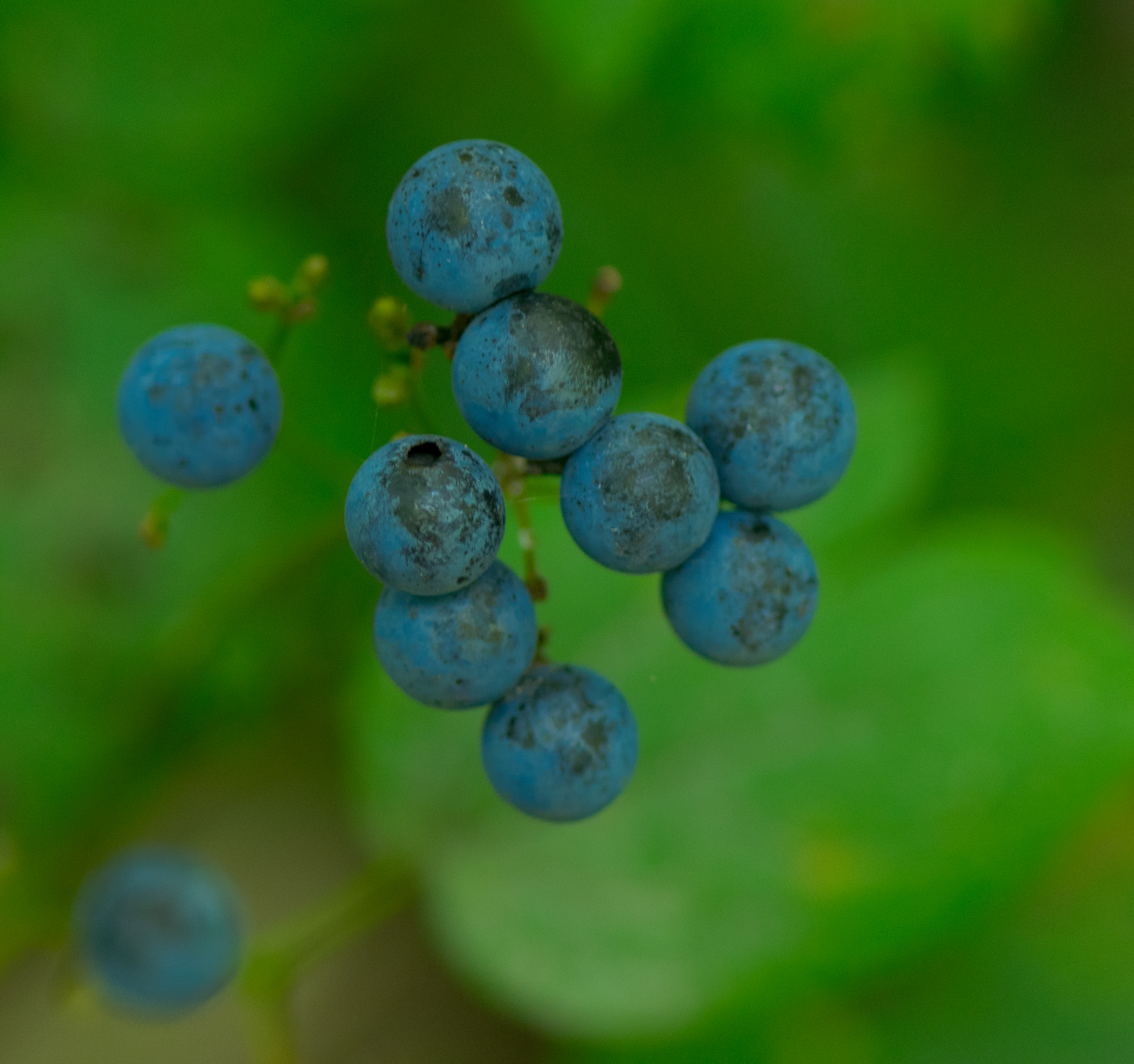
Ripe berries of infructescence, viewed from above

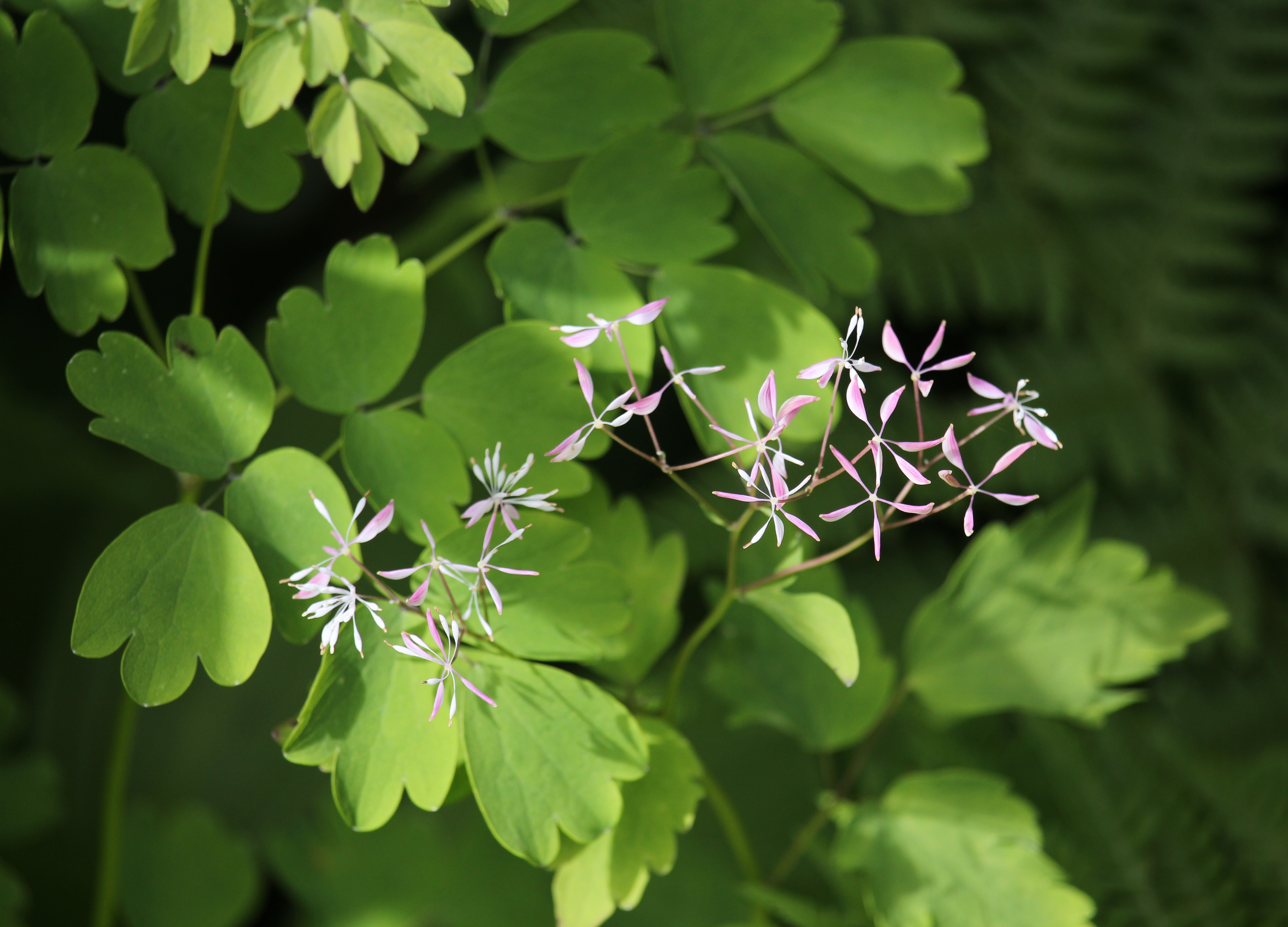
Two Thalictrum species, showing the foliage referenced in the specific name of
C. thalictroides

== Toxicity ==
When used in high doses as an abortifacient, symptoms similar to nicotine poisoning can occur. These are not limited to nausea and emesis, headache, dizziness, muscle fasciculations, tachycardia, tachypnea, hypertension seizure, and respiratory failure.

== Chemical composition ==
The root contains essential fatty acids, glucosides, phytosterols, saponins, and resinous essential oil. Blue cohosh contains the plant alkaloid N-methylcytisine, which is a nicotinic acetylcholine receptor agonist

== See also ==
- Black cohosh (Actaea racemosa), although similarly named, is actually a plant in a different family (Ranunculaceae).
