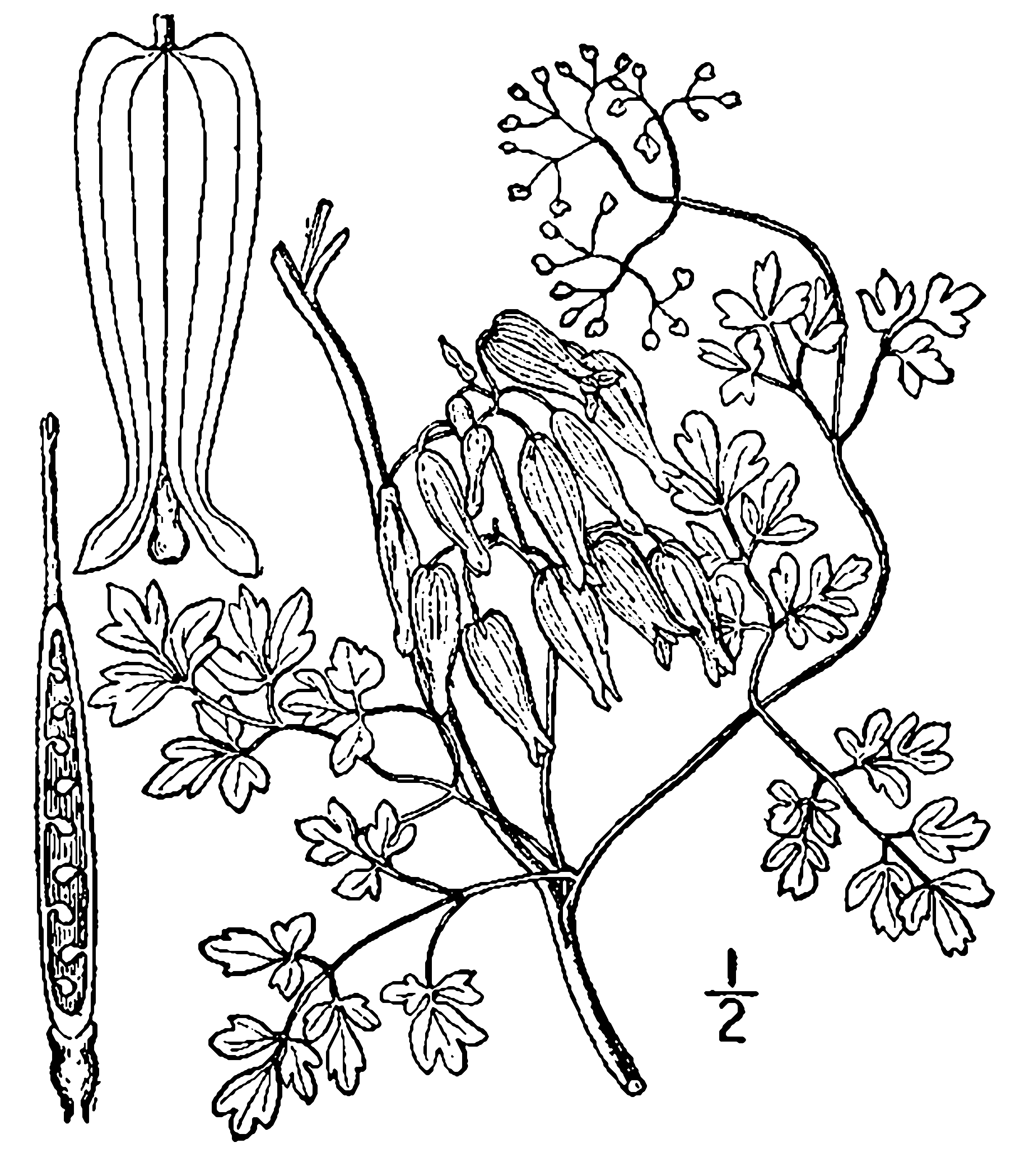
- Adlumia fungosa

Scientific classification
- Kingdom: Plantae
- Clade: Embryophytes
- Clade: Tracheophytes
- Clade: Angiosperms
- Clade: Eudicots
- Order: Ranunculales
- Family: Papaveraceae
- Subfamily: Fumarioideae
- Tribe: Fumarieae
- Subtribe: Corydalinae
- Genus: Adlumia; Raf. ex DC.

Species
- Adlumia asiatica Ohwi; Adlumia fungosa (Aiton) Greene ex Britton, Sterns & Poggenb.

Synonyms
- Bicuculla Borkh.

= Adlumia =

Genus of flowering plants in the poppy family

Adlumia is a genus of two species in the family Papaveraceae. The genus name derives from John Adlum (1759–1836), a surveyor, associate judge, plantsman and agriculturist who ran an 80 hectares (200 acres) experimental farm in Georgetown, Washington, D.C. The genus was first described and published in Syst. Nat. Vol.2 on page 111 in 1821.

One species, Adlumia fungosa, is commonly known as the Allegheny vine, climbing fumitory, or mountain fringe. It is found in the eastern US, north of Virginia and Tennessee, as far west as Iowa and Minnesota, as well as in eastern Canada.

The other species, Adlumia asiatica, is native to Korea and immediately neighbouring parts of China (in Manchuria) and southeast Russia (within Amur and Khabarovsk).
