= Wichí (disambiguation) =

The Wichí are an indigenous people of Argentina and Bolivia.

Wichí may also refer to:

Other uses include:

- Wichí languages, which include:
  - Wichí Lhamtés Güisnay, an indigenous language of Argentina and Chile
  - Wichí Lhamtés Nocten, an indigenous language of Bolivia and Argentina
  - Wichí Lhamtés Vejoz, an indigenous language of Argentina and Bolivia
- Wichí – El Pintado, village and municipality in Chaco Province in northern Argentina
