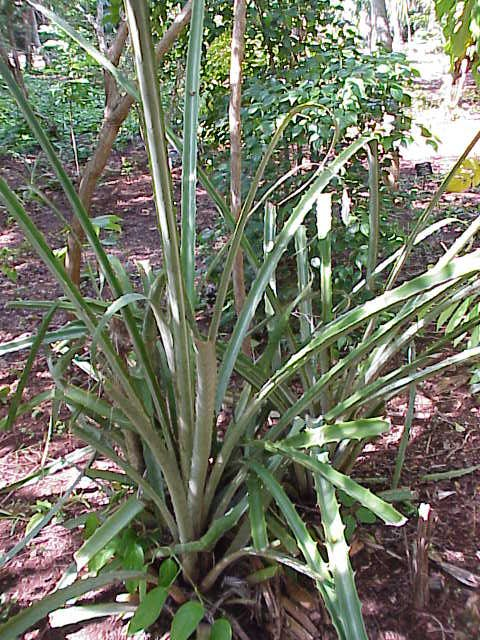
- Bromelia karatas

Scientific classification
- Kingdom: Plantae
- Clade: Tracheophytes
- Clade: Angiosperms
- Clade: Monocots
- Clade: Commelinids
- Order: Poales
- Family: Bromeliaceae
- Subfamily: Bromelioideae
- Genus: Bromelia; L.

Type species
- Bromelia karatas

Synonyms
- Karatas Mill.; Pinguin Adans.; Psedomelia Neck.; Agallostachys Beer; Distiacanthus Linden; Deinacanthon Mez

= Bromelia =

Genus of flowering plants

Bromelia is a genus of about 70 plant species widespread across Latin America and the West Indies. It is the type genus of the family Bromeliaceae, subfamily Bromelioideae, and its type species is B. karatas. Bromelia species are characterized by flowers with a deeply cleft calyx. The genus is named after the Swedish medical doctor and botanist Olof Bromelius (1639-1705).

== Species ==
Image	Scientific name	Distribution
	Bromelia agavifolia Brongniart ex Houllet	French Guiana
	Bromelia alsodes H. St. John	from Sinaloa south to Nicaragua
	Bromelia alta L.B. Smith	Guyana and Suriname
	Bromelia antiacantha Bertoloni	Brazil, Uruguay
	Bromelia araujoi P.J.Braun, Esteves & Scharf	Maranhão
	Bromelia arenaria Ule	Brazil (Bahia)
	Bromelia arubaiensis P.L. Ibisch & R. Vásquez	Bolivia
	Bromelia auriculata L.B. Smith	Ceará
	Bromelia balansae Mez	Brazil, Colombia, Bolivia, Argentina, Paraguay
	Bromelia binotii E. Morren ex Mez	Brazil (Espírito Santo)
	Bromelia braunii Leme & E. Esteves	Tocantins
	Bromelia charlesii P.J.Braun, Esteves & Scharf	Brazil (Bahia)
	Bromelia chrysantha Jacquin	Venezuela, Colombia, Trinidad & Tobago
	Bromelia dilatata Esteves, Hofacker & Scharf	Mato Grosso
	Bromelia eitenorum L.B. Smith	Maranhão
	Bromelia epiphytica L.B. Smith	Brazil (Amazonas)
	Bromelia estevesii Leme	Brazil (Piauí)
	Bromelia exigua Mez	Brazil (Goiás)
	Bromelia flemingii I. Ramírez & Carnevali	Aragua of Venezuela
	Bromelia fosteriana L.B. Smith	Suriname
	Bromelia fragilis L.B. Smith	Colombia
	Bromelia glaziovii Mez	Brazil (Minas Gerais and Goiás)
	Bromelia goeldiana L.B. Smith	Venezuela and Brazil
	Bromelia goyazensis Mez	Brazil (Goiás)
	Bromelia grandiflora Mez	Brazil
	Bromelia granvillei L.B. Smith & Gouda	French Guiana
	Bromelia gurkeniana E. Pereira & Moutinho	Brazil
	Bromelia hemisphaerica Lam.	from Guanajuato south to Panama
	Bromelia hieronymi Mez	Bolivia, Paraguay, Argentina
	Bromelia horstii Rauh	Brazil (Mato Grosso)
	Bromelia humilis Jacquin	Venezuela, Trinidad & Tobago, Netherlands Antilles
	Bromelia ignaciana R. Vásquez & P.L. Ibisch	Bolivia
	Bromelia interior L.B. Smith	Brazil
	Bromelia irwinii L.B. Smith	Goiás
	Bromelia karatas Linnaeus	West Indies; Latin America from San Luis Potosí + Sinaloa south to Brazil
	Bromelia laciniosa Martius ex Schultes f.	Brazil and Argentina
	Bromelia lagopus Mez	Brazil
	Bromelia legrellae (E. Morren) Mez	Brazil (Pará)
	Bromelia lindevaldae Leme & E. Esteves	Brazil (Bahia)
	Bromelia macedoi L.B. Smith	Brazil (Goiás)
	Bromelia michaelii Esteves, Hofacker & Scharf	Brazil (Goiás)
	Bromelia minima Leme & E. Esteves	Brazil (Goiás)
	Bromelia morreniana (Regel) Mez	northern Brazil
	Bromelia nidus-puellae (André) André ex Mez	Colombia
	Bromelia oliveirae L.B. Smith	Brazil (Pará)
	Bromelia palmeri Mez	from Colima south to Oaxaca
	Bromelia pinguin Linnaeus	West Indies; from Mexico to Ecuador and Suriname; naturalized in Florida
	Bromelia poeppigii Mez	Peru
	Bromelia redoutei (Baker) L.B. Smith	Guatemala.
	Bromelia regnellii Mez	Brazil
	Bromelia reversacantha Mez	Brazil (Goiás)
	Bromelia rondoniana L.B. Smith	Rondônia
	Bromelia scarlatina (hortus ex Hérincq) E. Morren	Ecuador and Brazil
	Bromelia serra Grisebach	Brazil, French Guiana, Bolivia, Paraguay, Argentina
	Bromelia superba Mez	Jamaica
	Bromelia sylvicola S. Moore	Brazil (Mato Grosso)
	Bromelia tarapotina Ule	Peru
	Bromelia trianae Mez	Colombia
	Bromelia tubulosa L.B. Smith	Venezuela and Brazil
	Bromelia unaensis Leme & Scharf	Brazil (Bahia)
	Bromelia urbaniana (Mez) L.B.Sm.	Paraguay and Argentina
	Bromelia villosa Mez	Bolivia and Brazil

== Cultivation and uses ==
The resistant fiber obtained from B. serra and B. hieronymi, both known as chaguar, is an essential component of the economy of the Wichí tribe in the semi-arid Gran Chaco region of Argentina. An 1841 publication described the fiber of silk grass (Bromelia karata) as "equal in durability to our best bowstrings."
