= False pineapple =

False pineapple may refer to:

- Ananas macrodontes
- Pandanus kaida
