= Vejoz =

Vejoz, Wejwus, or Wehwos may refer to:

- Vejoz people
- Vejoz language
