= Nocten =

Nocten, Nokten, or Oktenai may refer to:

- Nocten people
- Nocten language
