= Weenhayek =

Weenhayek may refer to:

- Weenhayek people
- Weenhayek language
