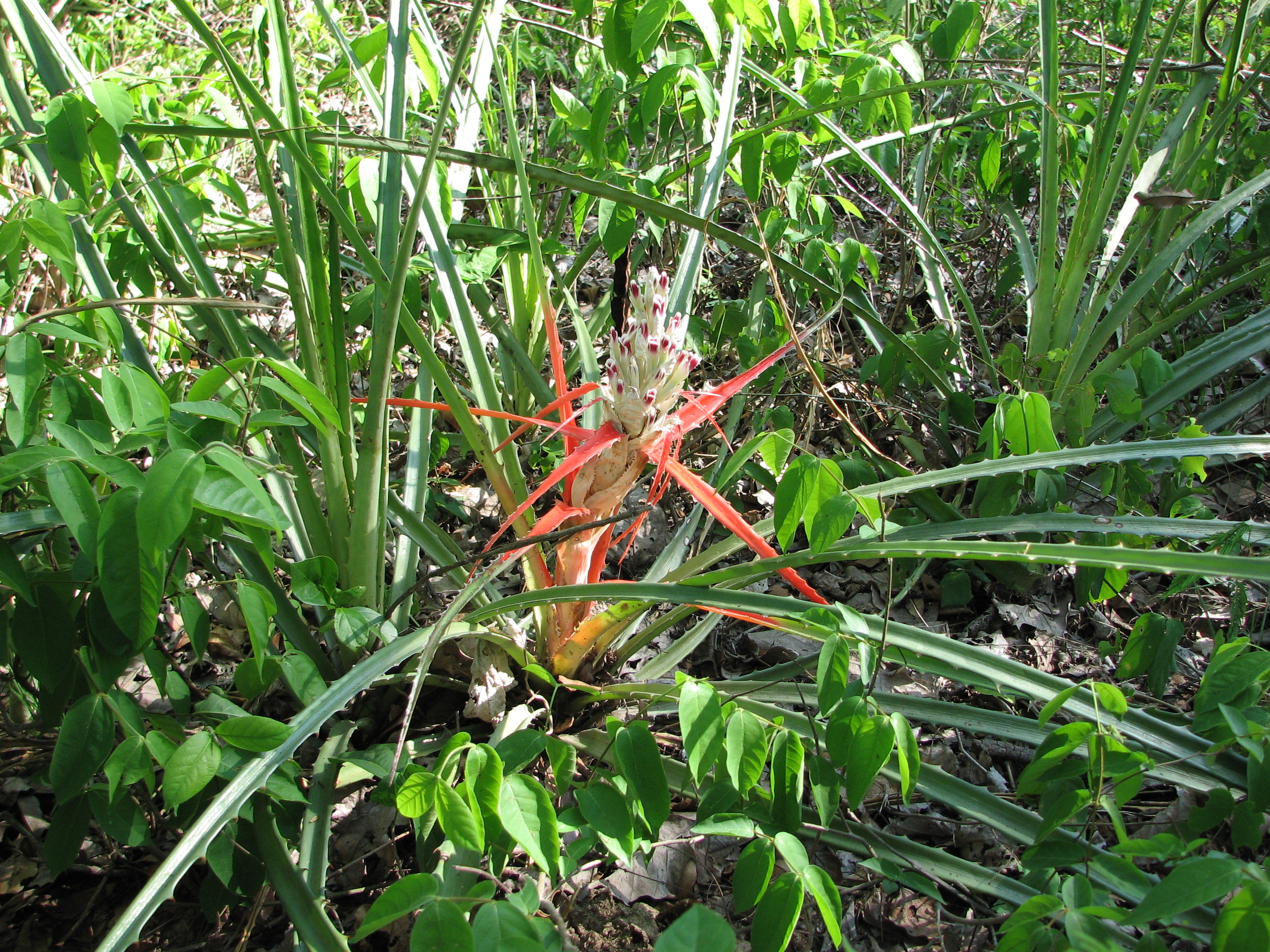

Scientific classification
- Kingdom: Plantae
- Clade: Tracheophytes
- Clade: Angiosperms
- Clade: Monocots
- Clade: Commelinids
- Order: Poales
- Family: Bromeliaceae
- Genus: Bromelia
- Species: B. sylvicola

Binomial name
- Bromelia sylvicola S. Moore 1895

= Bromelia sylvicola =

Species of flowering plant

Bromelia sylvicola is a species of Bromelia from Brazil.
