= Bromelia villosa =

Scientific classification
- Kingdom: Plantae
- Clade: Embryophytes
- Clade: Tracheophytes
- Clade: Spermatophytes
- Clade: Angiosperms
- Clade: Monocots
- Clade: Commelinids
- Order: Poales
- Family: Bromeliaceae
- Genus: Bromelia
- Species: B. villosa

Binomial name
- Bromelia villosa Mez

Species of flowering plant

Bromelia villosa is a species of flowering plant in the family Bromeliaceae. This species is native to Bolivia and Brazil.
