= Bromelia tubulosa =

Scientific classification
- Kingdom: Plantae
- Clade: Tracheophytes
- Clade: Angiosperms
- Clade: Monocots
- Clade: Commelinids
- Order: Poales
- Family: Bromeliaceae
- Genus: Bromelia
- Species: B. tubulosa

Binomial name
- Bromelia tubulosa L.B.Sm.

Species of flowering plant

Bromelia tubulosa is a plant species in the genus Bromelia. This species is native to Venezuela.
