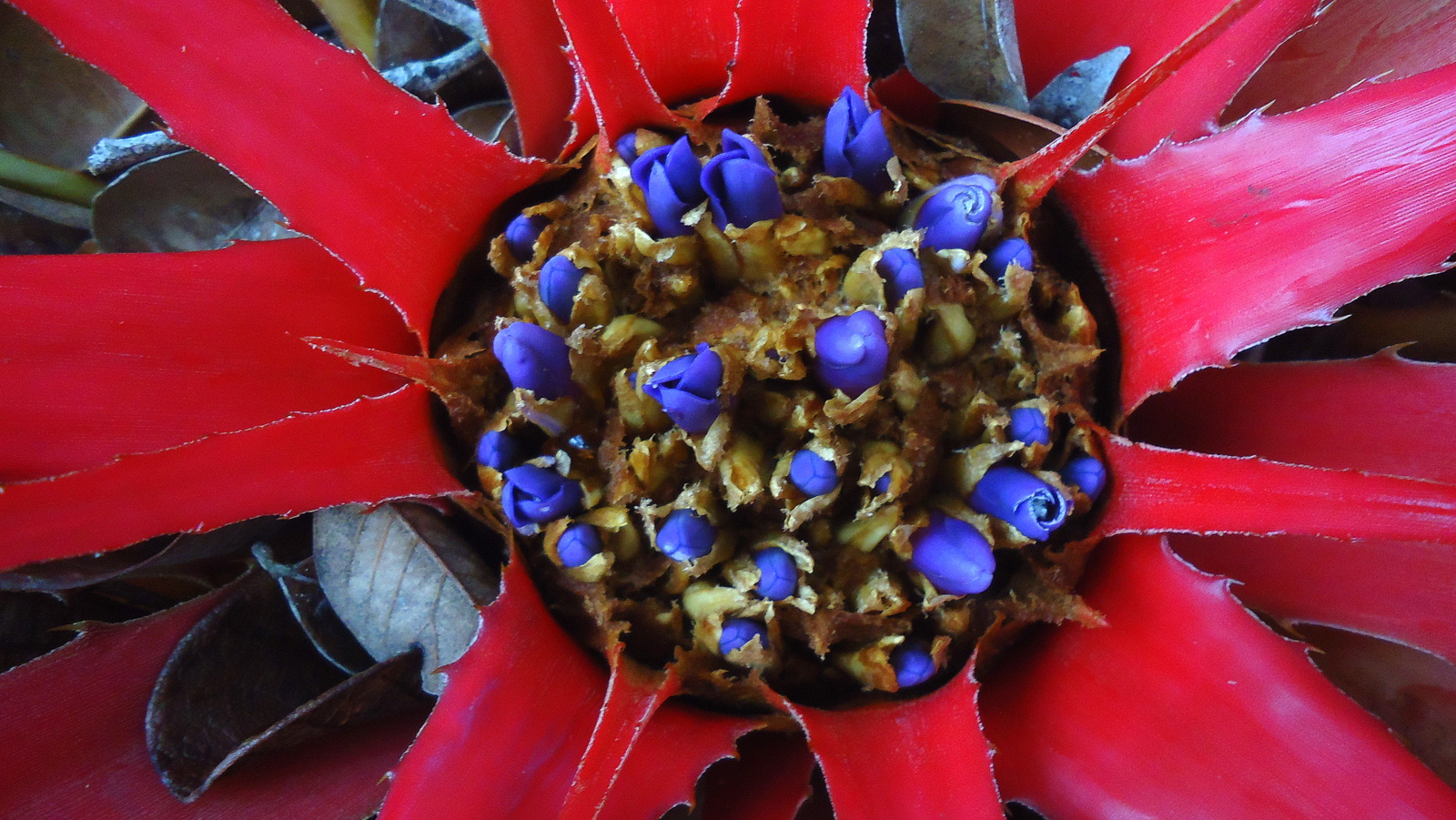

Scientific classification
- Kingdom: Plantae
- Clade: Tracheophytes
- Clade: Angiosperms
- Clade: Monocots
- Clade: Commelinids
- Order: Poales
- Family: Bromeliaceae
- Genus: Bromelia
- Species: B. unaensis

Binomial name
- Bromelia unaensis Leme, C. D. & Scharf 2011

= Bromelia unaensis =

Species of flowering plant

Bromelia unaensis is a species of Bromelia from Brazil.
