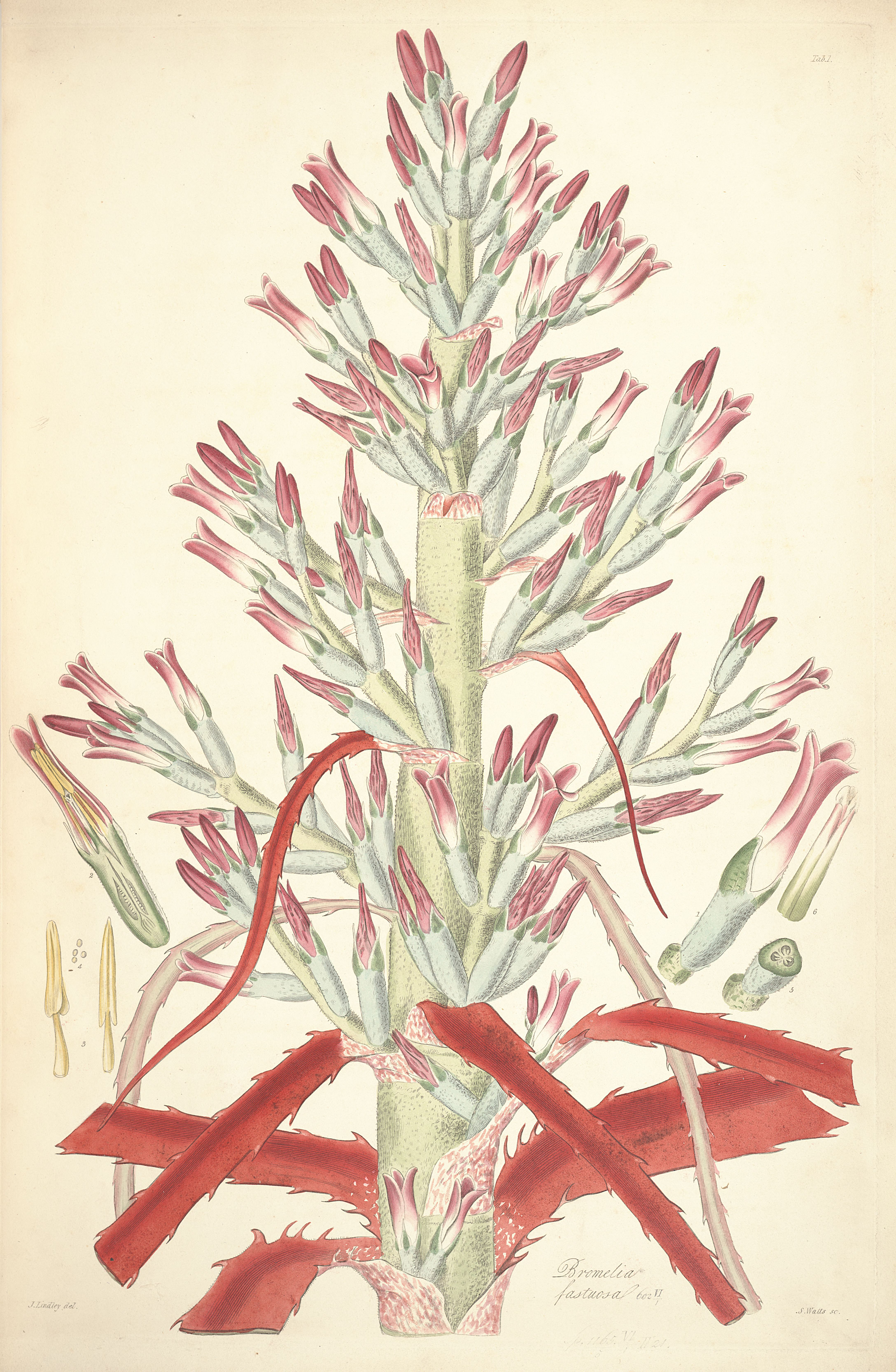
- 1821 illustration

Scientific classification
- Kingdom: Plantae
- Clade: Embryophytes
- Clade: Tracheophytes
- Clade: Spermatophytes
- Clade: Angiosperms
- Clade: Monocots
- Clade: Commelinids
- Order: Poales
- Family: Bromeliaceae
- Genus: Bromelia
- Species: B. pinguin

Binomial name
- Bromelia pinguin L.

Synonyms
- Karatas pinguin (L.) Mill.; Ananas pinguin (L.) Gaertn.; Agallostachys pinguin (L.) Beer; Bromelia fastuosa Lindl.; Bromelia sepiaria Schult. & Schult.f.; Agallostachys fastuosa (Lindl.) Beer; Bromelia ignea Beer

= Bromelia pinguin =

Species of flowering plant

Bromelia pinguin, also called ananas or anana, is a plant species in the genus Bromelia. This species is native to Central America, Mexico, the West Indies, and northern South America. It is also reportedly naturalized in Florida. It is very common in Jamaica, where it is planted as a fence around pasturelands on account of its prickly leaves, and has historically been used as an herbal abortifacient. The plant can be stripped of its pulp, soaked in water, and beaten with a wooden mallet, and it yields a fiber whence thread is made. In Nicaragua and El Salvador it is used to make gruel.

== History ==
Bromelia pinguin is mentioned in the diaries of Thomas Thistlewood, an 18th‑century slave-owner and plantation owner living in Jamaica. Thistlewood notes his use of Bromelia pinguin as a natural fence. Additionally, there is evidence that enslaved women on Thistlewood's plantations used Bromelia pinguin as an herbal abortifacient to terminate pregnancies caused by Thistlewood's sexual assaults.

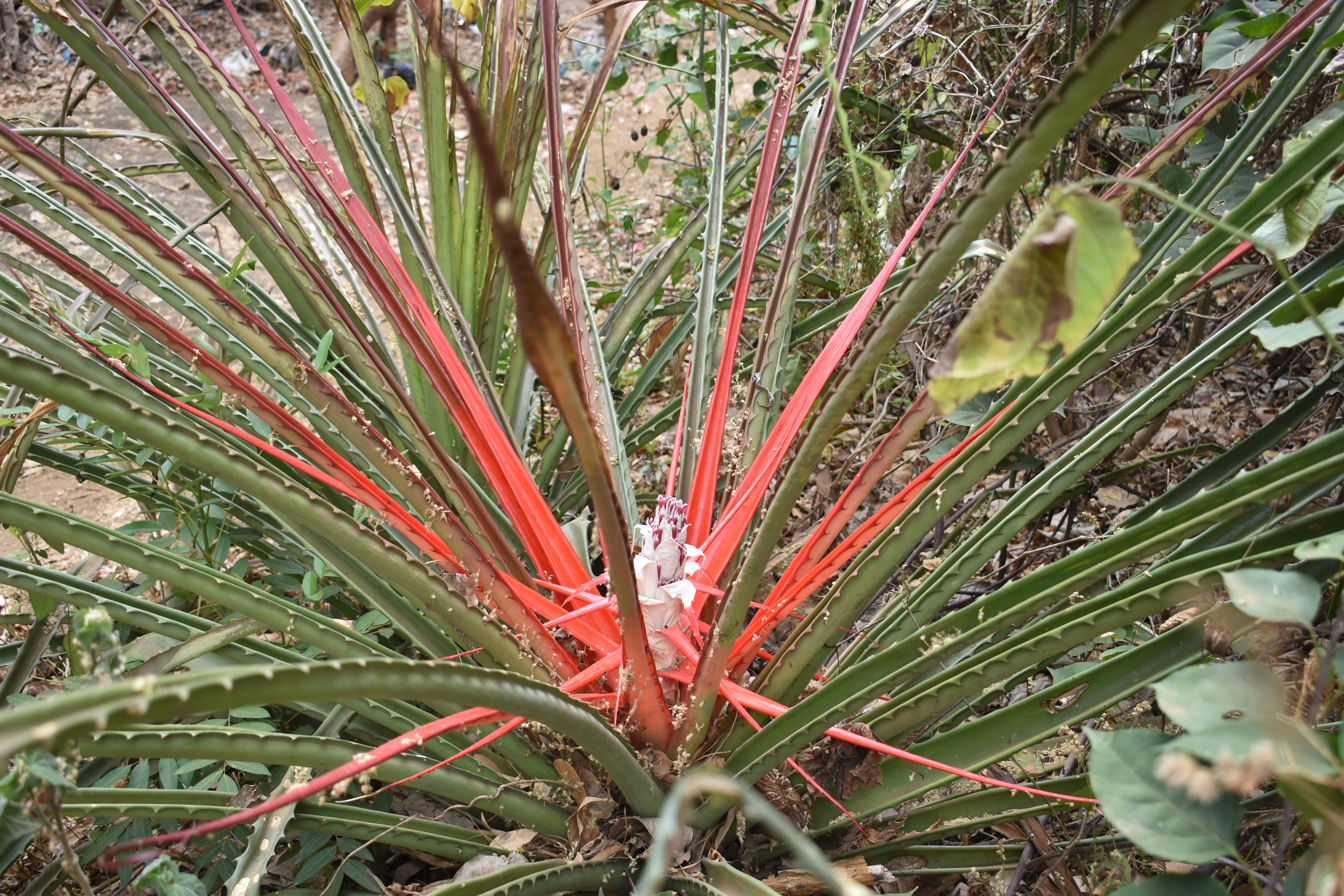
Bromelia pinguin (Piñuela) in El Crucero, Managua, Nicaragua.

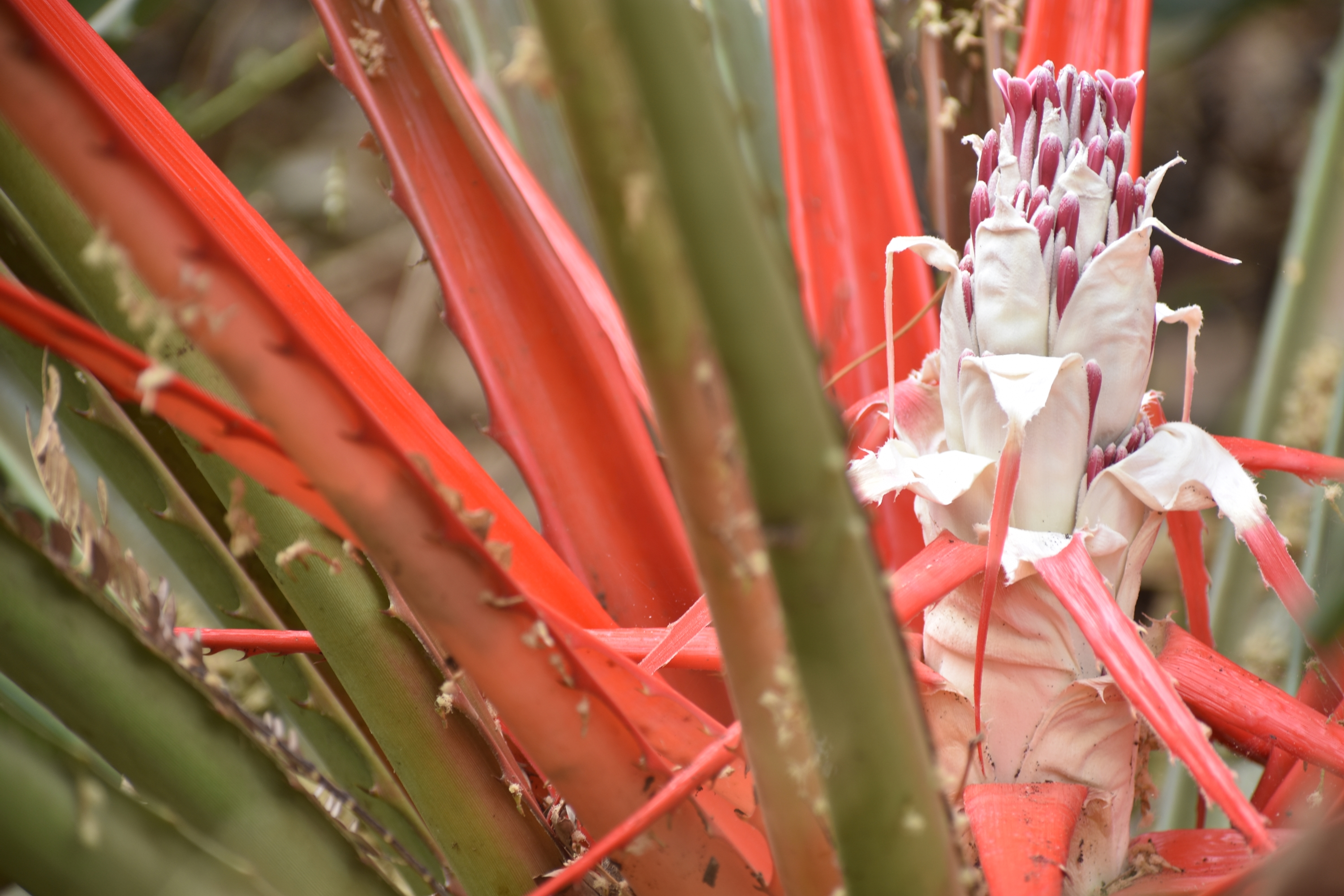
Bromelia pinguin flower in El Crucero, Managua, Nicaragua

== Additional sources ==
- Luther, Harry E. (1995). "An Annotated Checklist of the Bromeliaceae of Costa Rica". Selbyana. 16 (2): 230–234. ISSN 0361-185X. JSTOR 41759911.
- Espejo-Serna, Adolfo; López-Ferrari, Ana Rosa; Ramírez-morillo, Ivón; Holst, Bruce K.; Luther, Harry E.; Till, Walter (1 June 2004). "Checklist of Mexican Bromeliaceae with Notes on Species Distribution and Levels of Endemism". Selbyana. 25 (1): 33–86. ISSN 2689-0682. JSTOR 41760147.
- Holst, Bruce K. (1 February 1994). "Checklist of Venezuelan Bromeliaceae with Notes on Species Distribution by State and Levels of Endemism". Selbyana. 15 (1): 132–149. ISSN 2689-0682. JSTOR 41759858.
- Luther, H.E. (1999). "Bromeliaceae". In Jørgensen, P.M.; León-Yánez, S. (eds.). Catalogue of the vascular plants of Ecuador = Catálogo de las plantas vasculares del Ecuador (PDF). St. Louis, Mo.: Missouri Botanical Garden Press. pp. 337–361. ISBN 978-0915279609. Archived from the original (PDF) on 26 September 2006.
