= Bromelia goeldiana =

Scientific classification
- Kingdom: Plantae
- Clade: Tracheophytes
- Clade: Angiosperms
- Clade: Monocots
- Clade: Commelinids
- Order: Poales
- Family: Bromeliaceae
- Genus: Bromelia
- Species: B. goeldiana

Binomial name
- Bromelia goeldiana L.B.Sm.

Synonyms
- Bromelia cachimbensis L.B.Sm.

Species of flowering plant

Bromelia goeldiana is a plant species in the genus Bromelia. This species is native to Venezuela and Brazil.
