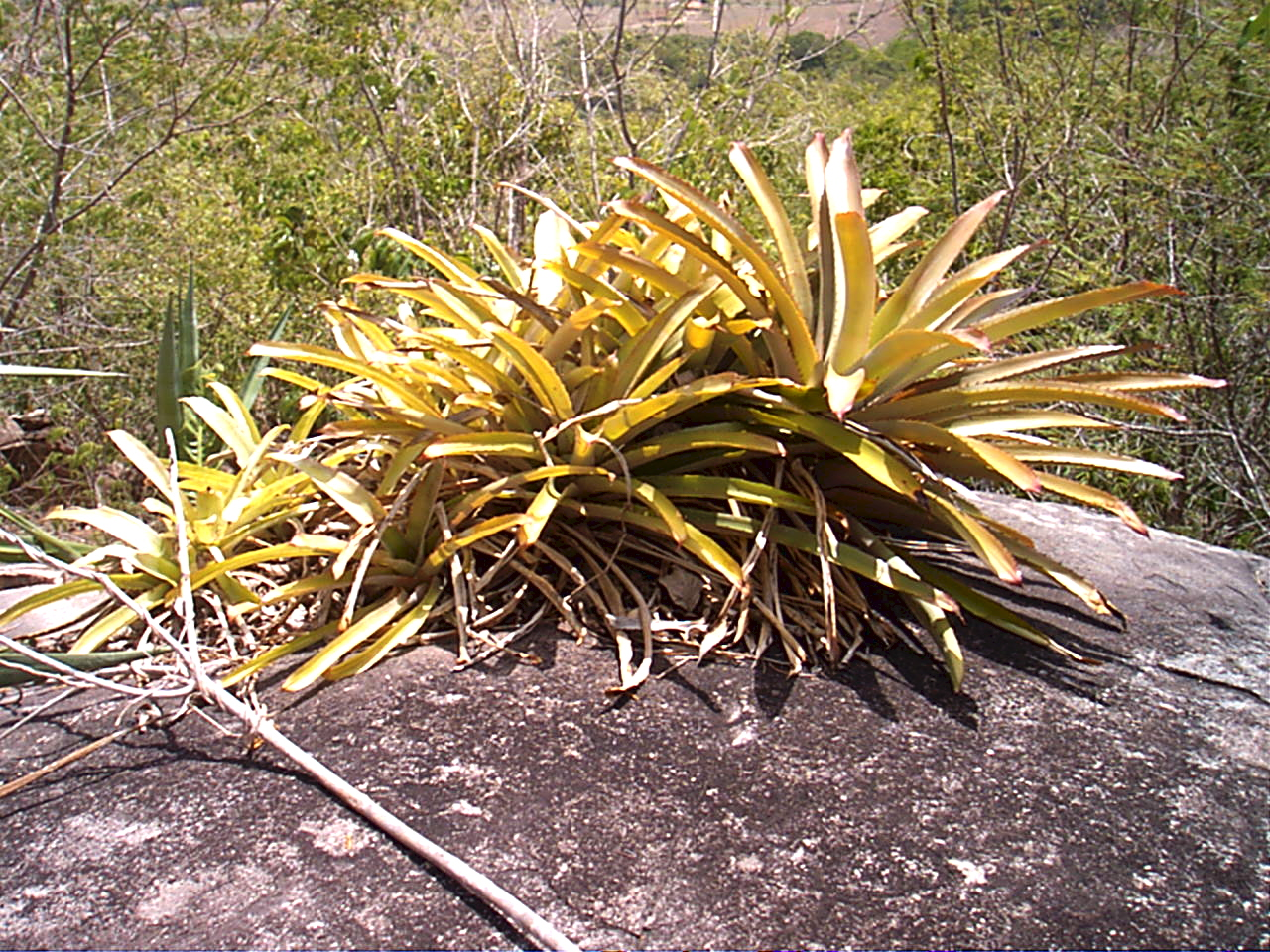

Scientific classification
- Kingdom: Plantae
- Clade: Tracheophytes
- Clade: Angiosperms
- Clade: Monocots
- Clade: Commelinids
- Order: Poales
- Family: Bromeliaceae
- Genus: Bromelia
- Species: B. laciniosa

Binomial name
- Bromelia laciniosa Mart. ex Schult.f.

Synonyms
- Agallostachys laciniosus (Mart. ex Schult. & Schult.f.) K.Koch

= Bromelia laciniosa =

Species of flowering plant

Bromelia laciniosa, natively known as macambira, is plant in the bromeliad family, or in other words, the pineapple family—though not all bromeliads resemble the common pineapple. Bromelia laciniosa is native to Brazil and Argentina but cultivated in many other places.

== Characteristics ==
The appearance of Bromelia laciniosa depends on various factors, like season and soil, but will typically look like a squat, yellowish-green, thorny shrub with streaks of purple and pink that run along its leaves and converge with the striking flower of the plant. The fruit of Bromelia laciniosa are yellow when ripe, though they are not directly eaten but mashed into a pulp to extract the plant's starchy substance that is made into flour. Like all bromeliads, the leaves of Bromelia laciniosa are covered with tiny scales that appear to be white and fuzzy; known as trichomes, these epidermal projections (leaf hairs) help the plant efficiently extract moisture from hot and dry climates. Bromelia laciniosa reproduces like other plants in its genus; bromeliads produce plantlets at their base, shoots that survive off of the mother plant until they reach the stage when they can extend their roots and survive on their own. Bromelia laciniosa is made up of around 63% starch, 4% sugars, 5% proteins, 13% crude fiber, and other various compounds.

== Climate ==
Bromeliads are found in various tropical environments, like rain forests, dry savannas, and semi-arid regions. Bromeliads typically grow under trees or in clearings, though Bromelia laciniosa seeds do not germinate in the absence of light, which means that the plant only begins to flower given the right conditions. If intercropped, it is thus vital that the Bromelia laciniosa is not shaded by other crops. Bromelia laciniosa has also been shown to be moderately successful in areas where soil degradation is a problem. Thus, this plant can be beneficial to locations where mulch is needed and/or where nutrients in the soil are weak. Bromelia laciniosa is extremely acclimated to barren climates, so the security that this plant offers is something that should be considered.

== Planting ==
Soaking the seeds of Bromelia laciniosa in acetone for 60 minutes is an effective treatment that increases vigor and germination. The roots of Bromelia laciniosa are thin to facilitate water absorption and reach over a meter deep and 8 inches in diameter; because of this, bromeliads generally have efficient nitrogen uptake. Therefore, Bromelia laciniosa would intercrop with a plant that doesn't compete for nutrients at its root depth level; also, the efficient nitrogen uptake of Bromelia laciniosa is important to keep in mind when intercropping and rotating crops. There is not much information regarding pests and diseases that are specific to Bromelia laciniosa, so in absence of this, it may be useful to refer to the prominent pathogens of the bromeliad family.

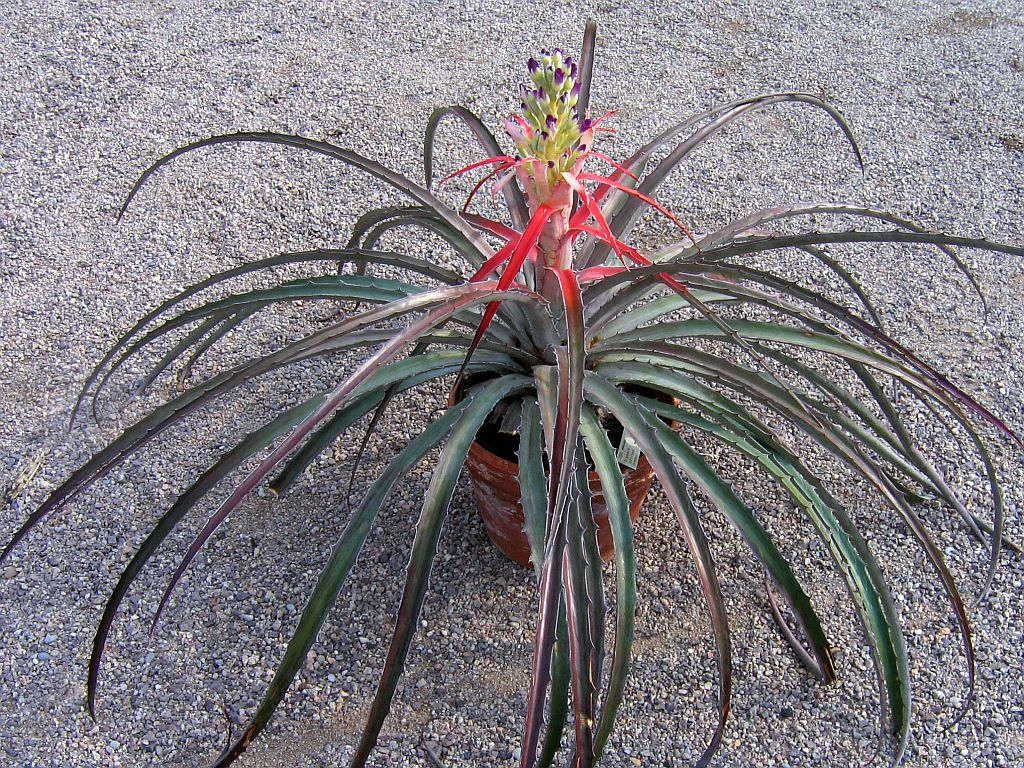
The vibrant flower of Bromelia laciniosa

== Uses ==
A significant negative of working with Bromelia laciniosa is that the extraction of its leaves is very laborious; the plant's blades need to be trimmed and packed into bundles to make the pulverizing of its stalks more productive. Farmers need to make a cost/benefit analysis to determine whether the labour and equipment is worth the rewards of growing Bromelia laciniosa. Strong fibers can also be extracted from Bromelia laciniosa; the blades of the plant are cut, its thorns removed, its leaves fermented for several days to loosen up the fibers, and then its stalks are dried and readied for fiber extraction; a caveat though is that this process gives off a pungent odor, so this task should be performed in a contained area. The leaves and fruit of Bromelia laciniosa can be boiled and ground to extract a starchy substance that, when dried, can be consumed as a flour that is a fiber and calcium rich source; in fact, the calcium content of this plant is the highest of any known plant species, evident by its 15 to 1 ratio of calcium content relative to cow milk. The concentrate of the roots of Bromelia laciniosa roots has been claimed to have various medical uses, such as to combat hepatitis, intestinal viruses, and as a diuretic.
