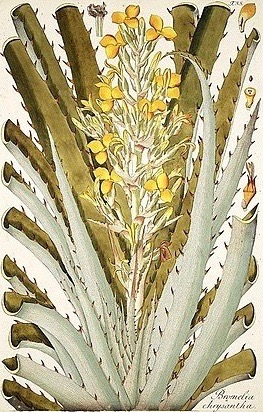

Scientific classification
- Kingdom: Plantae
- Clade: Tracheophytes
- Clade: Angiosperms
- Clade: Monocots
- Clade: Commelinids
- Order: Poales
- Family: Bromeliaceae
- Genus: Bromelia
- Species: B. chrysantha

Binomial name
- Bromelia chrysantha Jacquin

Synonyms
- Agallostachys chrysantha (Jacq.) Beer; Bromelia aurea Britton

= Bromelia chrysantha =

Species of flowering plant

Bromelia chrysantha is a plant species in the genus Bromelia. This species is native to Venezuela, Colombia, and Trinidad and Tobago.
