= Bromelia hemisphaerica =

Scientific classification
- Kingdom: Plantae
- Clade: Tracheophytes
- Clade: Angiosperms
- Clade: Monocots
- Clade: Commelinids
- Order: Poales
- Family: Bromeliaceae
- Genus: Bromelia
- Species: B. hemisphaerica

Binomial name
- Bromelia hemisphaerica Lam.

Species of flowering plant

Bromelia hemisphaerica is a plant species in the genus Bromelia. This species is native to Mexico and Costa Rica.
