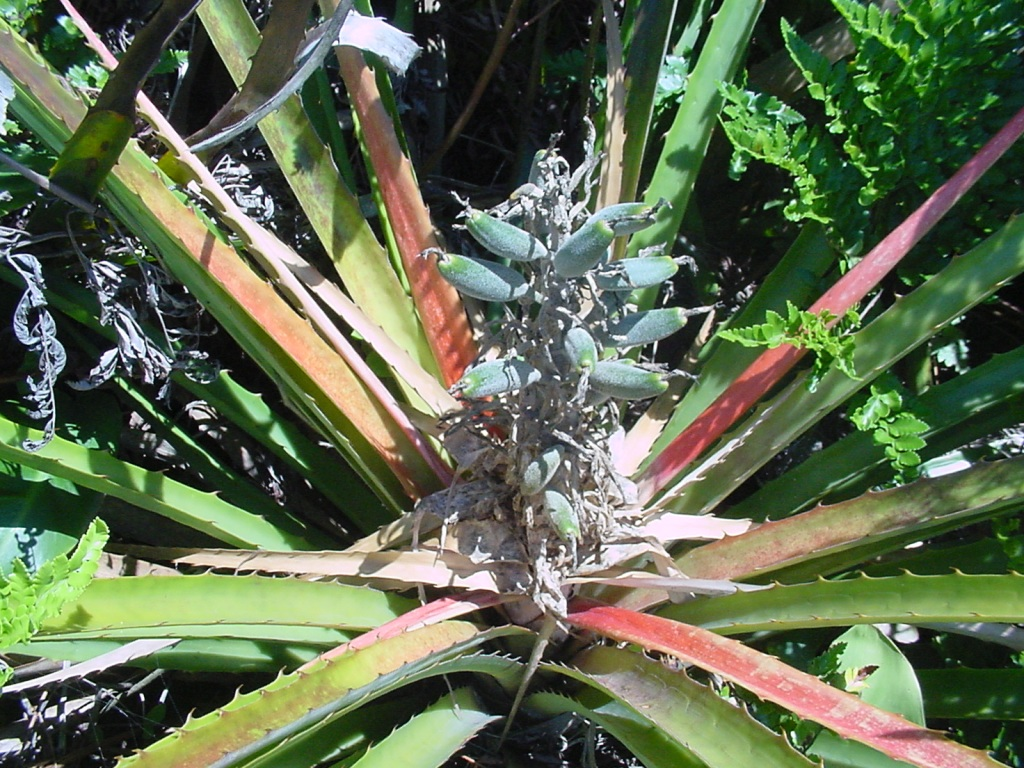

Scientific classification
- Kingdom: Plantae
- Clade: Tracheophytes
- Clade: Angiosperms
- Clade: Monocots
- Clade: Commelinids
- Order: Poales
- Family: Bromeliaceae
- Genus: Bromelia
- Species: B. antiacantha

Binomial name
- Bromelia antiacantha Bertoloni 1824

Synonyms
- Agallostachys antiacantha (Bertol.) Beer; Bromelia sceptrum Fenzl ex Hügel; Bromelia commeliniana de Vriese; Agallostachys commeliniana (de Vriese) Beer; Hechtia longifolia Baker

= Bromelia antiacantha =

Species of flowering plant

Bromelia antiacantha is a plant species in the genus Bromelia. This species is native to Brazil and Uruguay.
