= Bromelia regnellii =

Scientific classification
- Kingdom: Plantae
- Clade: Embryophytes
- Clade: Tracheophytes
- Clade: Spermatophytes
- Clade: Angiosperms
- Clade: Monocots
- Clade: Commelinids
- Order: Poales
- Family: Bromeliaceae
- Genus: Bromelia
- Species: B. regnellii

Binomial name
- Bromelia regnellii Mez

Species of flowering plant

Bromelia regnellii is a species of flowering plant in the family Bromeliaceae. This species is native to Brazil.
