= Bromelia scarlatina =

Scientific classification
- Kingdom: Plantae
- Clade: Tracheophytes
- Clade: Angiosperms
- Clade: Monocots
- Clade: Commelinids
- Order: Poales
- Family: Bromeliaceae
- Genus: Bromelia
- Species: B. scarlatina

Binomial name
- Bromelia scarlatina (Linden) É.Morren ex C.Morren

Synonyms
- Disteganthus scarlatinus (Linden) Rafarin; Distiacanthus scarlatinus Linden; Karatas scarlatina (Linden) Harms; Bromelia amazonica Linden

Species of flowering plant

Bromelia scarlatina is a species of flowering plant in the family Bromeliaceae. It is native to Brazil and Ecuador.
