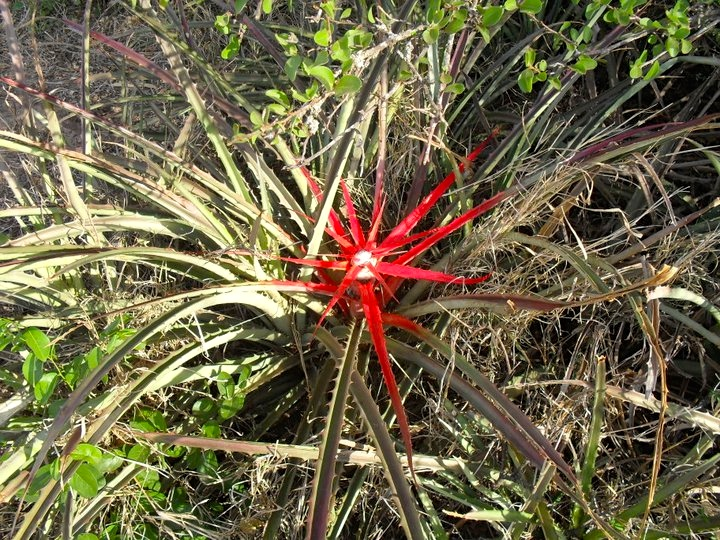

Scientific classification
- Kingdom: Plantae
- Clade: Embryophytes
- Clade: Tracheophytes
- Clade: Spermatophytes
- Clade: Angiosperms
- Clade: Monocots
- Clade: Commelinids
- Order: Poales
- Family: Bromeliaceae
- Genus: Bromelia
- Species: B. hieronymi

Binomial name
- Bromelia hieronymi Mez

= Bromelia hieronymi =

Species of plant

Bromelia hieronymi is a species of plant in the family Bromeliaceae native to Argentina, Bolivia and Paraguay. It is one of several plants used by the Wichí people as a fiber for weaving called chaguar. It has anti-inflammatory agents that are secreted by the fruit.

== Reproduction ==
Bromelia hieronymi is allogamous, self-incompatible and also displays clonal reproduction. It can also produce seedless fruit that develop without fertilization (parthenocarpy).
