= Chaguar =

Common name of several South American plants

Chaguar is the common name of several related species of South American plants of the family Bromeliaceae, among them Bromelia serra, Bromelia hieronymi, Deinacanthon urbanianum and Pseudananas sagenarius, which are non-woody forest plants with sword-shaped evergreen leaves, resembling yucca. The different varieties grow in the semi-arid parts of the Gran Chaco ecoregion.

The term chaguar is of Quechua origin; in areas where the Guaraní have had an influence, it is also known as caraguatá.

This plant is mainly employed by the Wichí tribal groups in the provinces of Salta and Formosa, Argentina, to provide a resistant fiber that can be woven to make bags and purses, ponchos, skirts, fishing nets, string, ropes, hammocks, mats, covers and clothing. Along with those made from hardwoods such as quebracho, chaguar crafts make up an important part of the economy of some Wichí groups, though the profits are scarce.

Chaguar is not cultivated. It grows in the semi-shade of a middle layer of the Chaco forest, and reproduces by stolons. Desertification of the Chaco has decreased its presence, but the plant is neither endangered nor of primary ecological importance. Farmers consider it a pest and, since its spines scare cattle, they sometimes burn the chaguarales (plant colonies) during the dry season.

There are no restrictions on the collection and use of chaguar among the Wichí, but the task is time-consuming and labor-intensive. This fact and the environmental ethics of the tribe discourage overexploitation.
