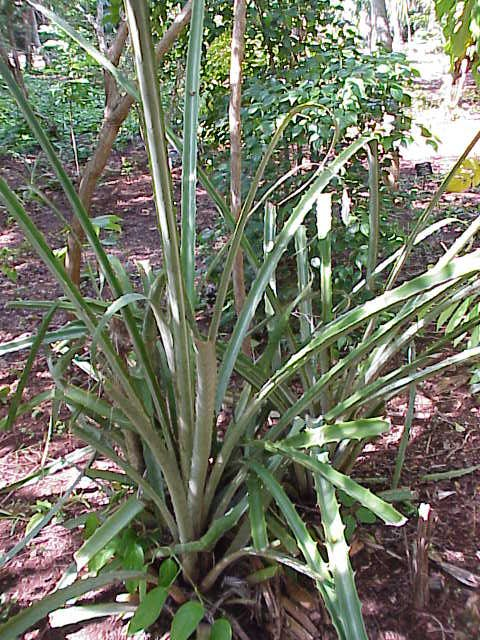

Scientific classification
- Kingdom: Plantae
- Clade: Tracheophytes
- Clade: Angiosperms
- Clade: Monocots
- Clade: Commelinids
- Order: Poales
- Family: Bromeliaceae
- Genus: Bromelia
- Species: B. karatas

Binomial name
- Bromelia karatas L.

Synonyms
- Nidularium karatas (L.) Lem. ex Griseb; Karatas karatas (L.) Voss; Bromelia caratas Hill; Bromelia acanga L.; Bromelia nudicaulis var. caraguata Lam.; Bromelia acaulis Stokes; Karatas plumieri E.Morren; Karatas lagopus E.Morren ex Devans.; Bromelia plumieri (E.Morren) L.B.Sm.

= Bromelia karatas =

Species of flowering plant

Bromelia karatas is a plant species in the genus Bromelia. This species is native to West Indies and to Latin America from San Luis Potosí and Sinaloa south to Brazil.
