= Bromelia binotii =

Scientific classification
- Kingdom: Plantae
- Clade: Embryophytes
- Clade: Tracheophytes
- Clade: Spermatophytes
- Clade: Angiosperms
- Clade: Monocots
- Clade: Commelinids
- Order: Poales
- Family: Bromeliaceae
- Genus: Bromelia
- Species: B. binotii

Binomial name
- Bromelia binotii E.Morren ex Mez

Synonyms
- Heterotypic Synonyms: Bromelia benotii T.Moore & Mast.; Bromelia fastuosa var. bergmannii Regel

Species of flowering plant

Bromelia binotii is a species of flowering plant in the family Bromeliaceae. This species is endemic to Brazil.
