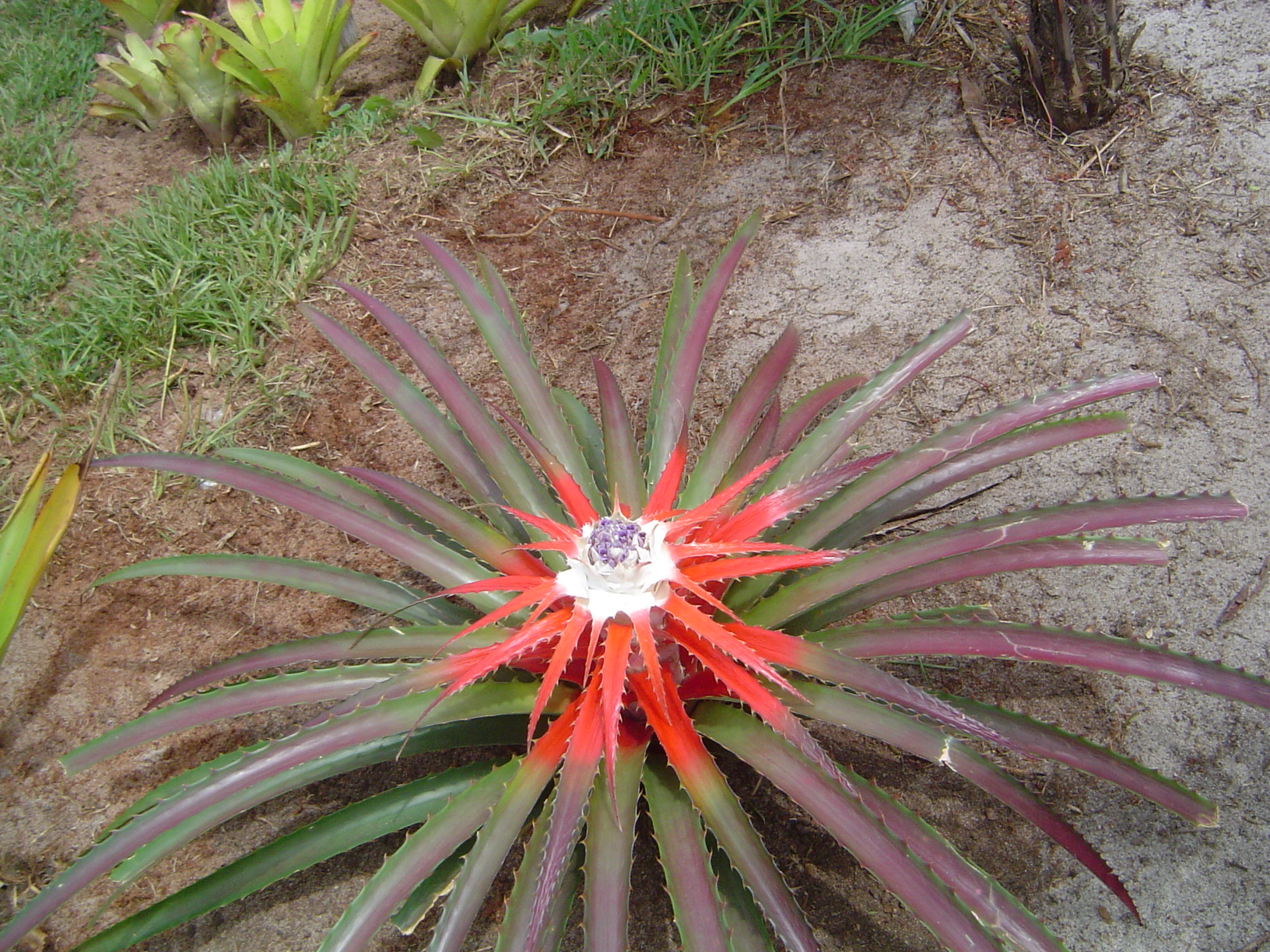

Scientific classification
- Kingdom: Plantae
- Clade: Embryophytes
- Clade: Tracheophytes
- Clade: Spermatophytes
- Clade: Angiosperms
- Clade: Monocots
- Clade: Commelinids
- Order: Poales
- Family: Bromeliaceae
- Genus: Bromelia
- Species: B. balansae

Binomial name
- Bromelia balansae Mez

Synonyms
- Heterotypic Synonyms: Bromelia argentina Baker; Bromelia balansae f. tricolor (M.B.Foster) L.B.Sm.; Bromelia balansae var. tricolor M.B.Foster; Karatas guianensis Baker

= Bromelia balansae =

Species of flowering plant

Bromelia balansae is a species of flowering plant in the family Bromeliaceae. This species is native to Argentina, Brazil, Colombia, Bolivia, and Paraguay where it grows at elevations of 150 to 3,000 feet.

== Description ==
Bromelia balansae is a large terrestrial bromeliad somewhat resembling the pineapple. Bromelias contain green leaves that grow 2–4 feet long with very sharp spines. When prepared to bloom, the center of the plant becomes bright red and then white prior to releasing an orange fruit - for its flower the plant is known as the "heart of flame". The orange-colored fruit it yields is said to make a cooling drink. It was described as the most commonly cultivated bromelia in a book from the last century and may be used as fencing due to its large and rapid growth. It thrives in full sun and is best suited for growing outdoors.

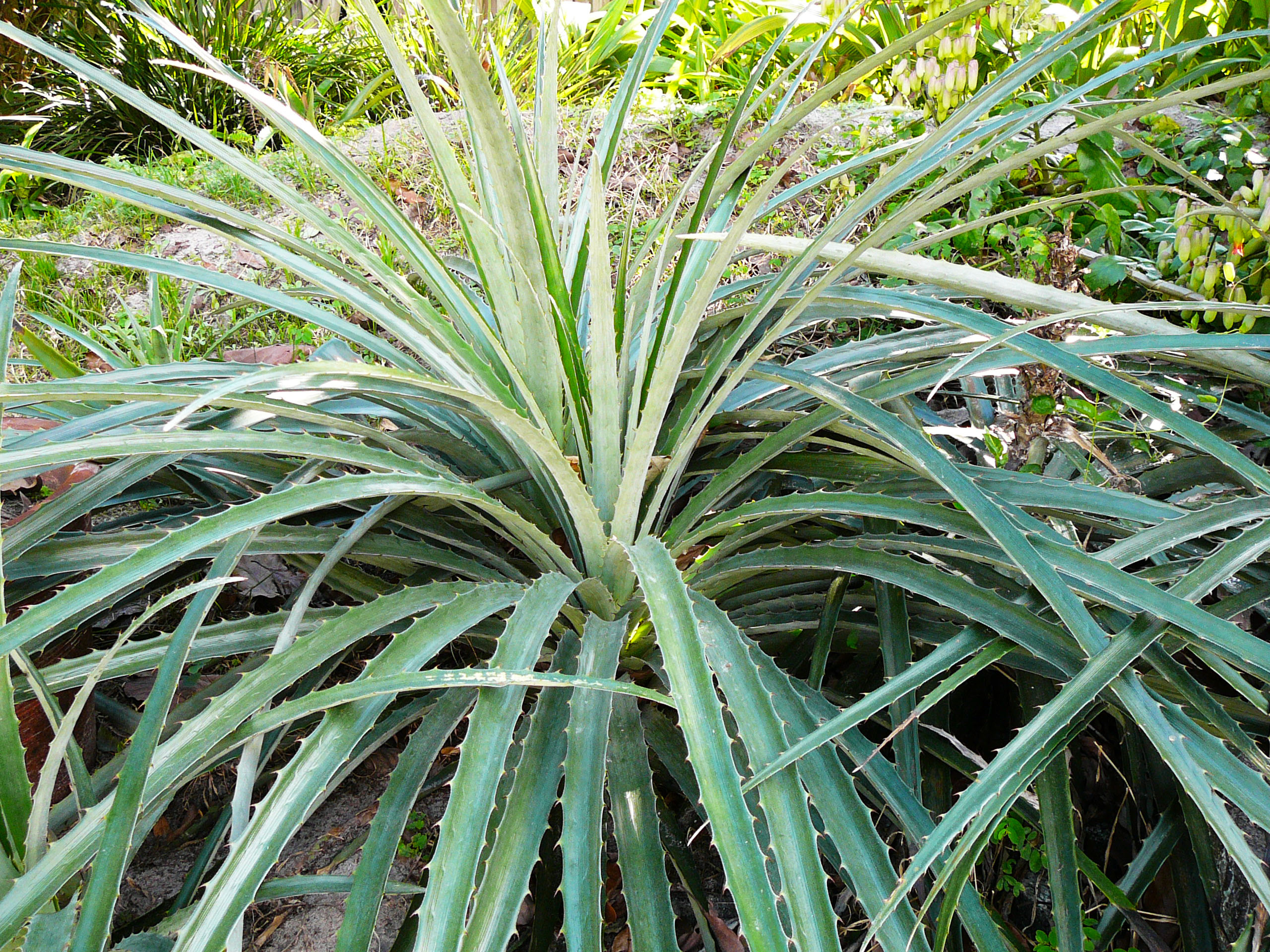
Bromelia balansae, a spiny species that closely resembles the pineapple.
