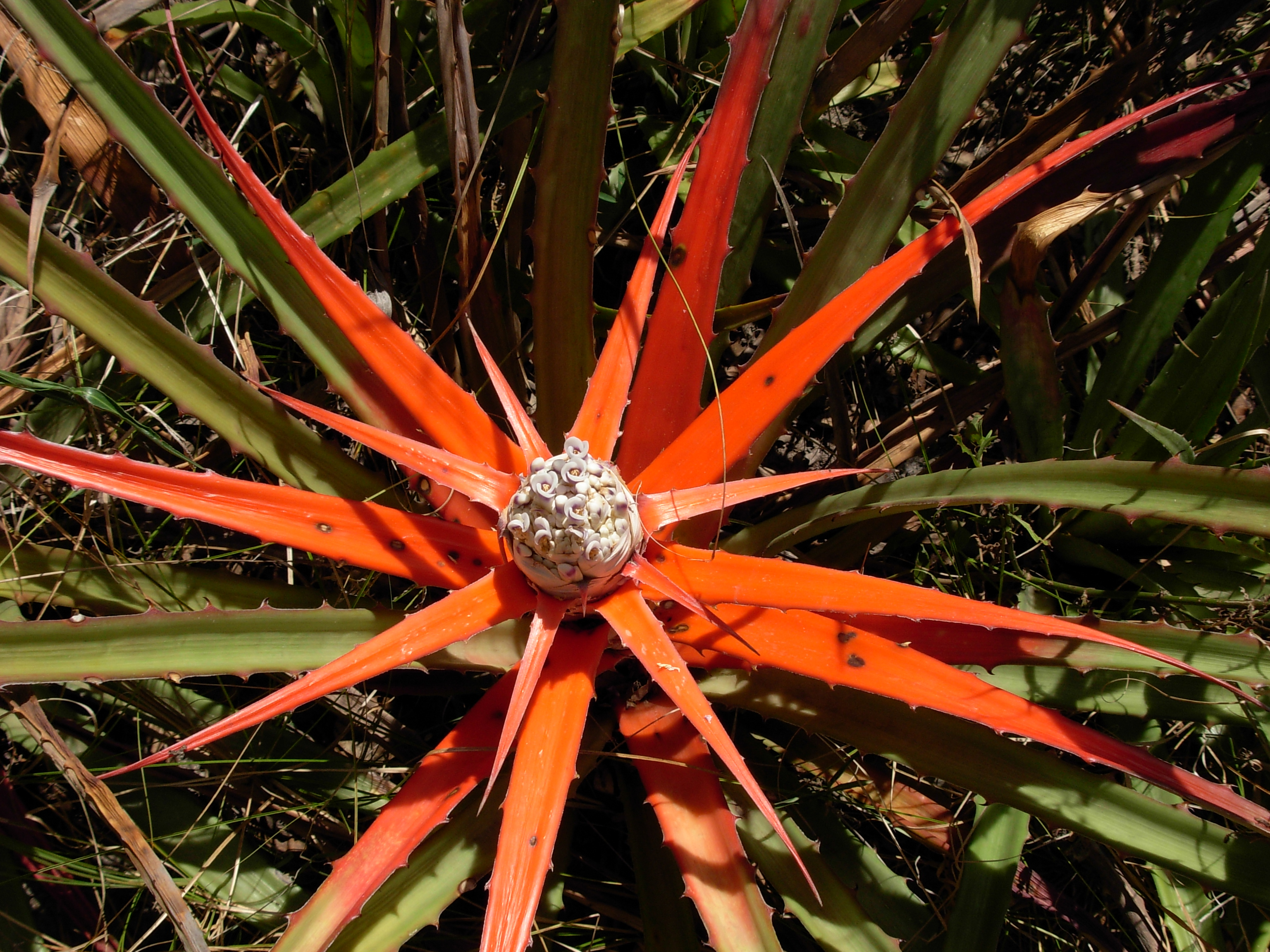

Conservation status
- Data Deficient (IUCN 3.1)

Scientific classification
- Kingdom: Plantae
- Clade: Tracheophytes
- Clade: Angiosperms
- Clade: Monocots
- Clade: Commelinids
- Order: Poales
- Family: Bromeliaceae
- Genus: Bromelia
- Species: B. serra

Binomial name
- Bromelia serra Griseb.

Synonyms
- Karatas serra (Griseb.) Burkill; Rhodostachys argentina Baker; Karatas laciniosa Lindm.; Bromelia lindmanii Mez; Bromelia serra var. variegata M.B.Foster; Bromelia serra f. variegata (M.B.Foster) M.B.Foster ex L.B.Sm.

= Bromelia serra =

Species of flowering plant

Bromelia serra is a species of flowering plant in the family Bromeliaceae. It is native to South America (Brazil, French Guiana, Bolivia, Paraguay, Argentina). It is one of several plants used by the Wichí people as a fiber for weaving called chaguar.
