= Bromelia palmeri =

Scientific classification
- Kingdom: Plantae
- Clade: Embryophytes
- Clade: Tracheophytes
- Clade: Spermatophytes
- Clade: Angiosperms
- Clade: Monocots
- Clade: Commelinids
- Order: Poales
- Family: Bromeliaceae
- Genus: Bromelia
- Species: B. palmeri

Binomial name
- Bromelia palmeri Mez

Synonyms
- Heterotypic Synonyms: Bromelia mucronata Mez

Species of flowering plant

Bromelia palmeri is a species of flowering plant in the family Bromeliaceae. This species is endemic to southwestern Mexico, from Colima south to Oaxaca.
