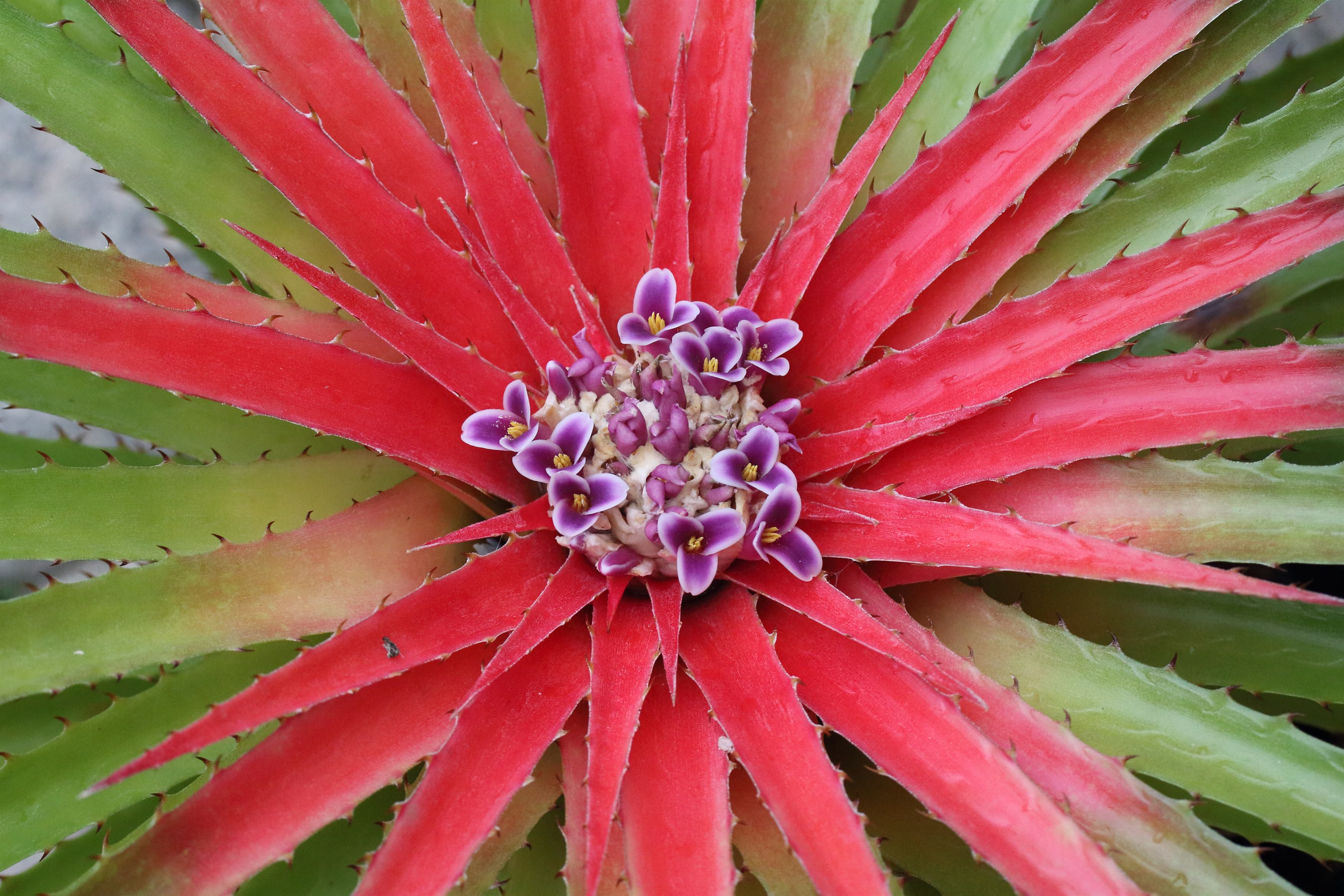

Scientific classification
- Kingdom: Plantae
- Clade: Tracheophytes
- Clade: Angiosperms
- Clade: Monocots
- Clade: Commelinids
- Order: Poales
- Family: Bromeliaceae
- Genus: Bromelia
- Species: B. humilis

Binomial name
- Bromelia humilis Jacquin

Synonyms
- Karatas humilis (Jacq.) E.Morren; Madvigia humilis (Jacq.) Liebm. ex Antoine; Bromelia lasiantha Willd. ex Schult. & Schult.f.; Karatas lasiantha (Willd. ex Schult. & Schult.f.) Harms

= Bromelia humilis =

Dwarf Bromelia

Species of flowering plant

Bromelia humilis, the dwarf bromelia, is a plant species in the genus Bromelia. This species is native to Venezuela, Trinidad and Tobago, and the Netherlands Antilles.
