= Wichí languages =

Indigenous language family of Argentina

Wichí
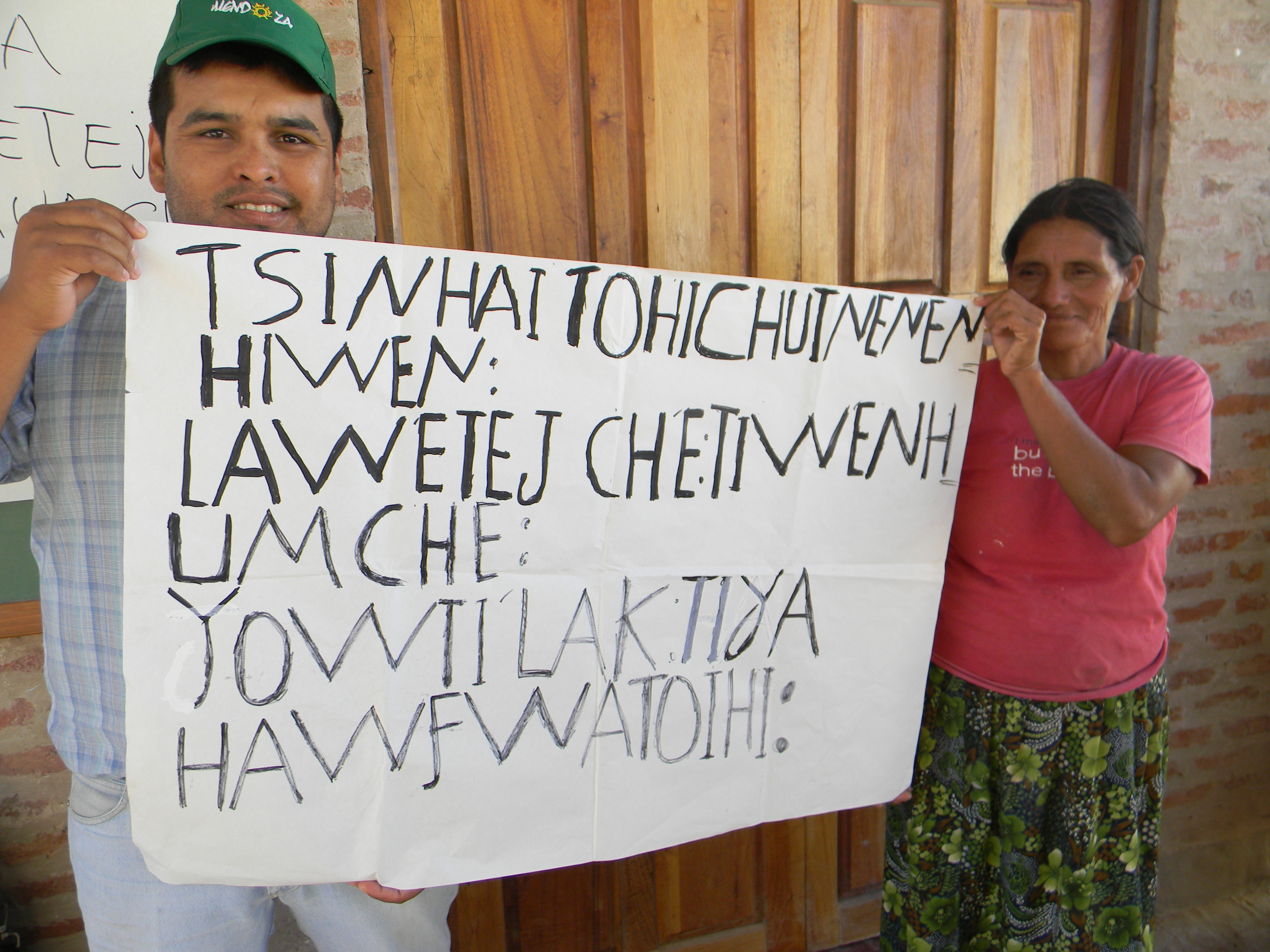
- Sign in Wichí
- Geographic distribution: Argentina, Bolivia
- Linguistic classification: Matacoan: Wichí
- Subdivisions: Güisnay; Nocten; Vejoz

Language codes
- Glottolog: wich1261
- ELP: Wichí

The Wichí languages are an indigenous language family spoken by the Wichí in northwestern Argentina and far-southeastern Bolivia, part of the Matacoan family. They are also known as Mataco, Wichi, Wichí Lhamtés, Weenhayek, Noctenes, Matahuayo, Matako, Weʃwo. The name Mataco is common but pejorative.

== Status ==
Currently, the Argentine government does not have education in indigenous languages in schools. Because the Wichí have to be fluent in Spanish to access government services, and children are only educated in Spanish, Wichí children only speak Spanish among themselves. This has made all Wichí dialects vulnerable to extinction.

In 2010, the province of Chaco in Argentina declared Wichí as one of four provincial official languages alongside Spanish and the indigenous Moqoit and Qom.

== Languages ==
The Wichí languages include the following languages:

- Noktén (a.k.a. Noctén, Wichí Lhamtés Nocten), spoken in Bolivia and Argentina
- Vejoz (a.k.a. Vejo, Pilcomayo, Bermejo, Wichí Lhamtés Vejoz), spoken in Argentina and Bolivia
- Wiznay (a.k.a. Güisnay, Wichí Lhamtés Güisnay), spoken in Argentina.

The Argentine National Institute of Statistics and Censuses (INDEC) gives a figure of 36,135 Wichí speakers in Argentina.

In Rosario, the third biggest city of Argentina, there is a community of about 10,000 Wichí people, all of them fluent in Wichí, and some native speakers. There are a couple of bilingual primary schools.

For Bolivia, Alvarsson estimated between 1,700 and 2,000 speakers in 1988; a census reported 1,912, and Díez Astete & Riester (1996) estimated between 2,300 and 2,600 Weenhayek in sixteen communities.

According to Najlis (1968) and Gordon (2005), three main dialects can be distinguished in the Wichí group: southwestern or Vejós (Wehwós), northeastern or Güisnay (Weenhayek) and northwestern or Nocten (Oktenay). Tovar (1981) and other authors claim the existence of only two dialects (northeastern and southwestern), while Braunstein (1992–3) identifies eleven ethnic subgroups.

Wichí languages are predominantly suffixing and polysynthetic; verbal words have between 2 and 15 morphemes. Alienable and inalienable possession is distinguished. The phonological inventory is large, with simple, glottalized and aspirated stops and sonorants. The number of vowels varies with dialect (five or six).
