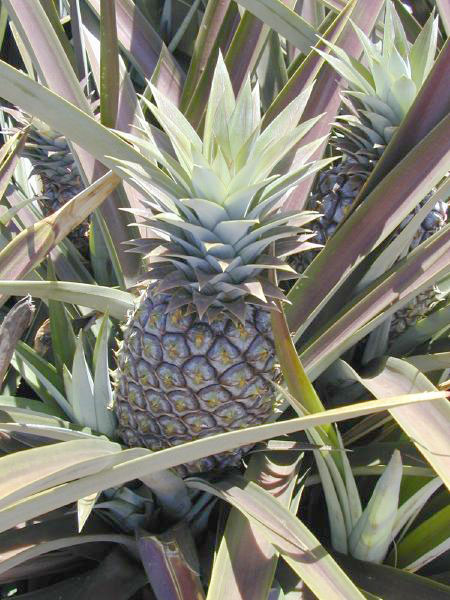
- Pineapple (Ananas comosus)

Scientific classification
- Kingdom: Plantae
- Clade: Tracheophytes
- Clade: Angiosperms
- Clade: Monocots
- Clade: Commelinids
- Order: Poales
- Family: Bromeliaceae
- Subfamily: Bromelioideae
- Genus: Ananas; Mill.
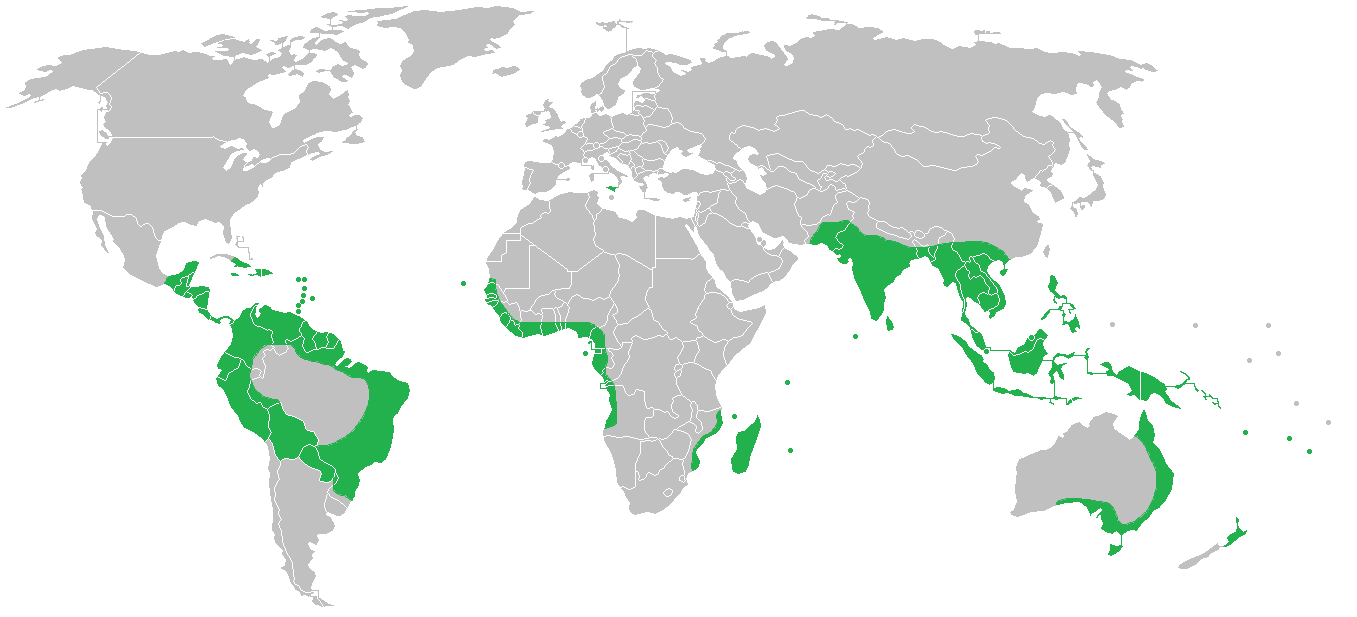

Synonyms
- Ananassa Lindl.; Pseudananas Hassl. ex Harms in H.G.A.Engler

= Ananas =

Genus of fruits and plants

Ananas is a plant genus in the family Bromeliaceae. It is native to South America. The genus contains Ananas comosus, the pineapple.

== Species ==
The genus Ananas includes only two species:

Image	Scientific name	Common name	Native Distribution
	Ananas comosus (L.) Merr.	Pineapple	East of the Andes, from northern South America to northern Argentina.
	Ananas macrodontes E.Morren	False Pineapple	Coastal Brazil and basins of Parana and Paraguay rivers to northern Argentina.

== Gallery ==
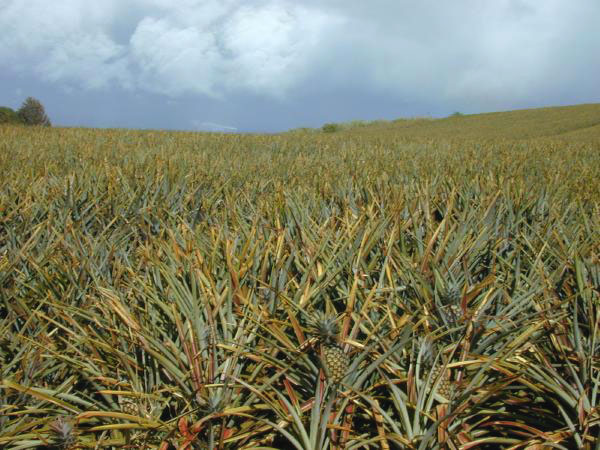
Pineapple plantation

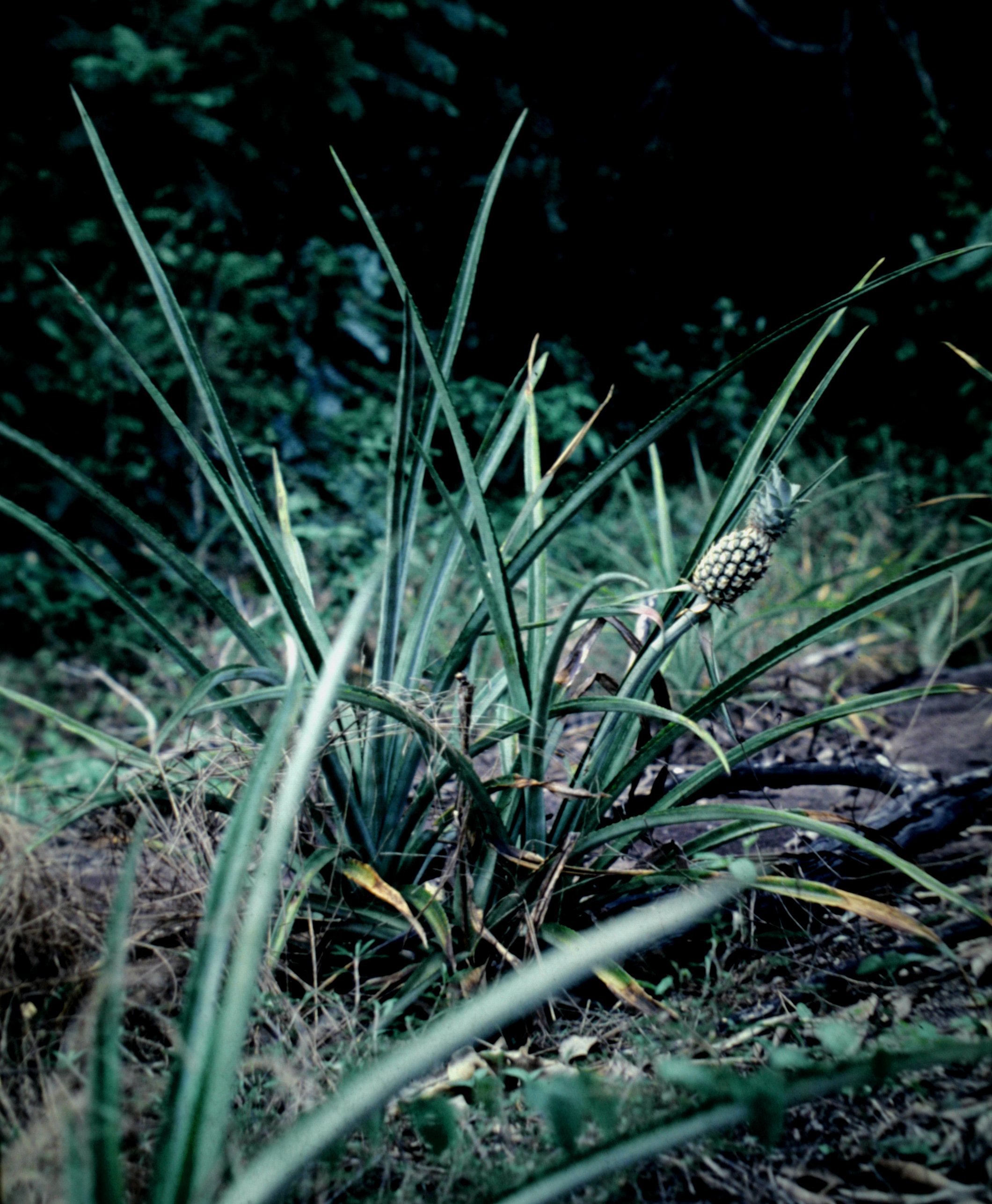
Ananas comosus, habitat, Suriname

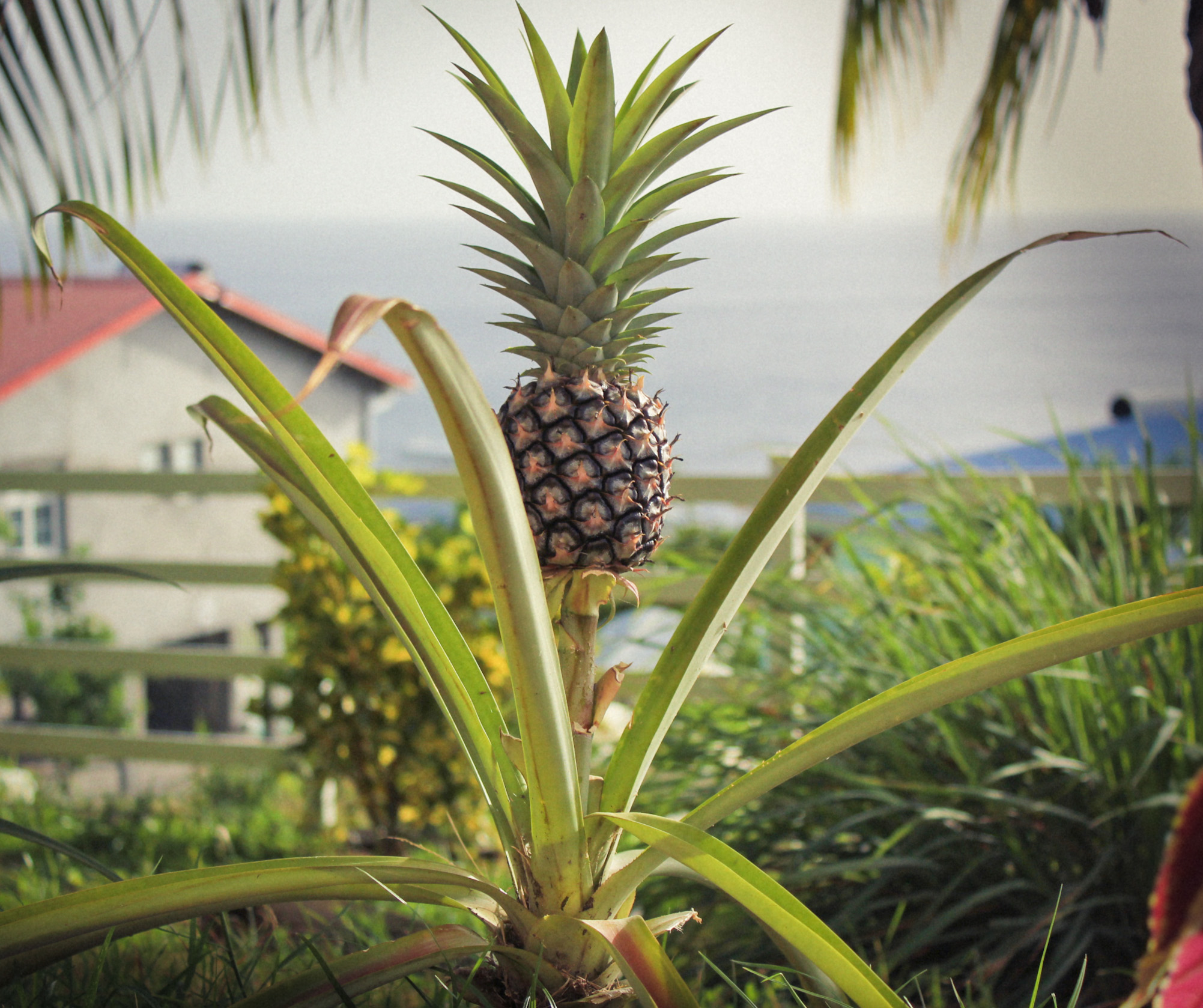
A pineapple in a garden in Martinique (Caribbean Sea)
