= Wichí Lhamtés Güisnay =

Wichí language of Argentina

- Wiznay
- Native to: Argentina
- Ethnicity: Wichí
- Native speakers: 26,500 (2021)
- Language family: Matacoan: Wichi language; Wichí Lhamtés Güisnay

Language codes
- ISO 639-3: mzh
- Glottolog: wich1264
- ELP: Wichí

Wichí Lhamtés Güisnay or Wiznay is a Wichí language. Wichí Lhamtés Güisnay had an estimated 15,000 speakers in 1999 in Argentina. The language is centered in the Pilcomayo River region. Other names for the language include Güisnay, Mataco, Mataco Güisnay, Mataco Pilcomayo, and Wichí Lhamtés. A grammar book has been written for the language.

The Wichí languages are predominantly suffixing and polysynthetic; verbal words have between 2 and 15 morphemes. Alienable and inalienable possession is distinguished. The phonological inventory is large, with simple, glottalized and aspirated stops and sonorants. The number of vowels varies with the language (five or six).

== Phonology ==
Consonants in the Misión La Paz Wichí dialect
		Labial	Alveolar			Palatal	Velar			Glottal	
		Labial	central	sibilant	lateral	Palatal	plain	labial	pal.	plain	labial
Plosive/ Affricate	plain	p	t	ts			k	kʷ	kʲ	ʔ	
Plosive/ Affricate	ejective	pʼ	tʼ	tsʼ			kʼ		kʲʼ		
Fricative				s						h	hʷ
Nasal		m	n								
Lateral	voiced				l						
Lateral	voiceless				l̥						
Approximant						j		w			

- Aspirated sounds [pʰ, tʰ, kʰ~qʰ] only occur as allophones of /p, t, k/.
- /k, kʷ, kʼ/ can also have allophones of [q, qʷ, qʼ].
- /m, n/ can have allophones [m̥, n̥, n̥ʲ] word-medially, when occurring after /h/. [n̥ʲ] occurs when /i/ is preceding the sequence /nh/.
- /h/ can also be heard as [x] word-medially and word-finally.

Vowels in the Misión La Paz Wichí dialect
	Front	Central	Back
Close	i		u
Mid	e		o
Open		a	(ɑ)

- /a/ can have an allophone of [ɑ].

== See also ==
- Wichí Lhamtés Nocten
- Wichí Lhamtés Vejoz
