= Pandanus kaida =

Conservation status
- Least Concern (IUCN 3.1)

Scientific classification
- Kingdom: Plantae
- Clade: Tracheophytes
- Clade: Angiosperms
- Clade: Monocots
- Order: Pandanales
- Family: Pandanaceae
- Genus: Pandanus
- Species: P. kaida

Binomial name
- Pandanus kaida Kurz

Synonyms
- Pandanus candelabrum (Gaudich.) Kurz; Pandanus forceps Martelli; Pandanus siamensis F.N.Williams; Tuckeya candelabrum Gaudich.

Species of flowering plant

Pandanus kaida is a monocot species of plant in the family Pandanaceae. It is cultivated and native to Cambodia, China, India, Sri Lanka, Thailand, and Vietnam. Provided the appearance of its fruit, the species is sometimes referred to as the false pineapple, despite not belonging to the pineapple genus.

== Uses ==
live fencing; medicinal; pollen-insect repellent. leaves- mats, boxes, hats.
