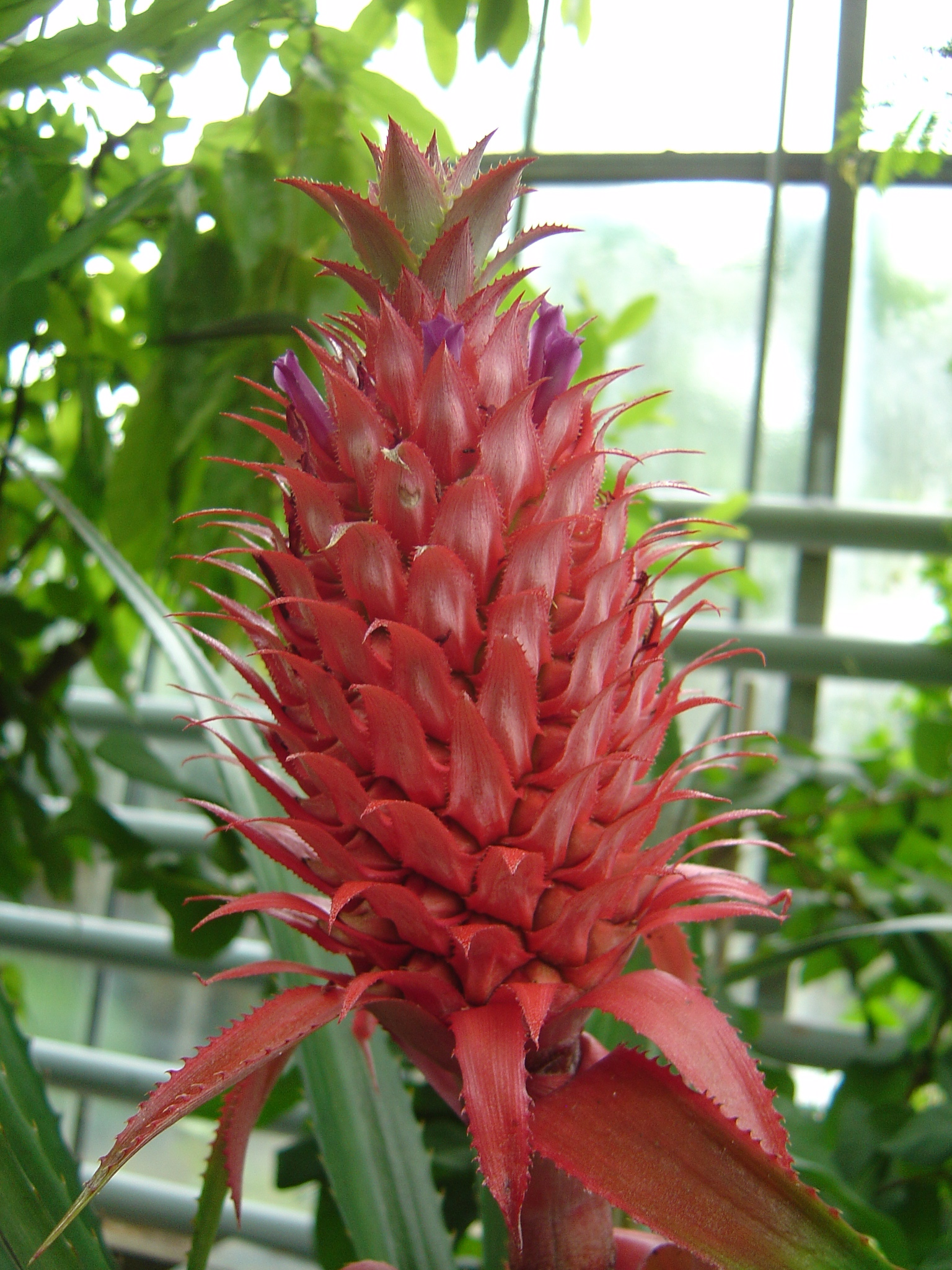

Scientific classification
- Kingdom: Plantae
- Clade: Tracheophytes
- Clade: Angiosperms
- Clade: Monocots
- Clade: Commelinids
- Order: Poales
- Family: Bromeliaceae
- Genus: Ananas
- Species: A. macrodontes

Binomial name
- Ananas macrodontes E.Morren

Synonyms
- List: Ananas microcephalus Bertoni; Ananas microcephalus var. major Bertoni; Ananas microcephalus var. minor Bertoni; Ananas microcephalus var. missionensis Bertoni; Ananas microcephalus var. mondayanus Bertoni; Ananas microcephalus var. robustus Bertoni; Ananas sagenaria (Arruda) Schult. & Schult.f.; Ananas sativus var. macrodontes (E.Morren) Bertoni; Bromelia sagenaria Arruda; Pseudananas macrodontes (E.Morren) Harms in H.G.A.Engler & K.A.E.Prantl; Pseudananas sagenarius (Arruda da Câmara) Camargo; Pseudananas sagenarius var. macrodontes (E.Morren) Camargo

= Ananas macrodontes =

Species of fruit and plant

Ananas macrodontes is a plant species closely related to the pineapple, in the family Bromeliaceae. Its common name is the false pineapple, a name shared with the not closely related Pandanus kaida. There is no consensus whether this species should belong in the same genus as the pineapple (Ananas), or in its own genus (Pseudananas).

It is native to central South America (Brazil, Bolivia, Paraguay, Ecuador, northern Argentina).

== Biology ==
This plant is found as part of the undergrowth of semi-deciduous and tropical rainforests. Like its close relatives, A. macrodontes can asexually reproduce by forming offshoots from the mother plant, known by gardeners as suckers. Like members of Ananas, it forms a composite fruit, which is a fruit formed from the ovaries of multiple flowers. This fruit is edible, but not as large or desirable as that of the pineapple, and typically contains small seeds. This plant is a tetraploid with an extra set of chromosomes, suggesting that this plant's origins may have been a hybrid between a member of genus Ananas and a different bromeliad genus.

== Cultivation ==
This plant is not harvested extensively for its fruit, as the fruit of its cousin the pineapple is much larger and more palatable. It is often used as an ornamental plant for its colorful foliage and as a hedge. This plant is hardier than the pineapple, and can survive light frosts, but will not tolerate very cold winters, being a tropical plant. In these colder climates and in the tropics, this plant is able to be potted and kept as a houseplant.
