= Wichí Lhamtés Vejoz =

Mataco-Guaicuru language of Argentina and Bolivia

- Native to: Argentina, Bolivia
- Ethnicity: Wichí
- Native speakers: 31,500 (2021)
- Language family: Matacoan: Wichi languages; Wichí Lhamtés Vejoz

Language codes
- ISO 639-3: wlv
- Glottolog: wich1263
- ELP: Wichí (shared)

Wichí Lhamtés Vejoz is a Mataco-Guaicuru language of Argentina and Bolivia. Speakers are concentrated in northern parts of Chaco, Formosa, Salta, Jujuy Provinces, as well as west of Toba, the upper Bermejo River valley, and Pilcomayo River. The language is also called Mataco Vejoz and Vejos.

The Wichí languages are predominantly suffixing and polysynthetic; verbal words have between 2 and 15 morphemes. Alienable and inalienable possession is distinguished. The phonological inventory is large, with simple, glottalized and aspirated stops and sonorants. The number of vowels varies with the language (five or six).

== Phonology ==
Consonants in the Chaqueña Wichí dialect
		Labial	Alveolar			Palatal	Velar	Uvular	Glottal
		Labial	central	sibilant	lateral	Palatal	Velar	Uvular	Glottal
Plosive/ Affricate	plain	p	t	ts		tʃ	kʷ	q	ʔ
Plosive/ Affricate	aspirated	pʰ	tʰ	tsʰ				qʰ	
Plosive/ Affricate	ejective	pʼ	tʼ	tsʼ		tʃʼ		qʼ	
Fricative		fʷ		s	ɬ			χ	h
Sonorant	voiced	m	n		l	j	w		
Sonorant	voiceless		n̥			j̊	w̥		
Sonorant	preglottal	ˀm	ˀn		ˀl	ˀj	ˀw		

Vowels in the Chaqueña Wichí dialect
	Front	Central	Back
Close	i		u
Mid	e		o
Open		a	

- /i/ is heard as [ɪ] after palatal consonants.
- /e/ is heard as [ɛ] when preceding uvular consonants.
- /a, o/ sounds can be heard as [ɑ, ɔ] before uvular consonants.
- /u/ can be heard as [ʊ] in syllable-final position.

== See also ==
- Wichí Lhamtés Nocten
- Wichí Lhamtés Güisnay
