= Wichí Lhamtés Nocten =

Wichí language spoken in Bolivia

- Weenhayek
- Native to: Bolivia, Argentina
- Region: Tarija Department (Bolivia), Salta Province (Argentina)
- Ethnicity: Wichí
- Native speakers: (1,900 cited 1994)
- Language family: Matacoan: Wichi languages; Wichí Lhamtés Nocten

Official status
- Official language in: Bolivia

Language codes
- ISO 639-3: mtp
- Glottolog: wich1262
- ELP: Wichí (shared)

Wichí Lhamtés Nocten, or Weenhayek, is a Wichí language spoken primarily in Bolivia, as well as in Argentina. The language is also called "Mataco", "Mataco Nocten", Nocten, Noctenes, and Oktenai, though the name "Mataco" has negative connotations.

== Status ==
An estimated 1,810 Wichí people spoke Weenhayek in Bolivia as of 1994. An additional 100 people spoke the language in Argentina in 1994.

== Official status ==
Weenhayek has been one of the 37 official languages of Bolivia since 2009, as outlined by the Constitution of Bolivia.

== Geographical distribution ==
In Bolivia, the language is spoken in the north-central Tarija Department, southwest of Pilcomayo River, and in Cordillera de Pirapo. In Argentina, it is spoken in from the northern border south to Tartagal, Salta.

== Classification ==
Weenhayek is one of the Wichí languages, a dialect continuum spoken throughout northern Argentina and southern Bolivia. Wichí is a further member of the Mataguayan language family.

== Phonology ==
Weenhayek displays marked phonological differences from the other varieties of Wichí.

=== Consonants ===
Consonants of Nocten
	Labial	Alveolar	Palatal	Velar			Uvular	Glottal
	Labial	central	Palatal	plain	labial	pal.	Uvular	Glottal
Plosive	p	t			kʷ	kʲ	q	ʔ
Affricate		ts						
Fricative		s		x	xʷ			h
Lateral		l						
Nasal	m	n						
Approximant	w		j					

/kʲ/, depending on the dialect and/or speaker, may be realized as an affricate [tʃ]. /p, t, kʲ, kʷ, q, ts/ may be aspirated [pʰ, tʰ, kʲʰ, kʷʰ, qʰ, tsʰ] when preceding /h/, or glottalized [pʼ, tʼ, kʲʼ, kʷʼ, qʼ, tsʼ] when preceding /ʔ/. /m, n, l, j, w/ within the position of /ʔ/ are also glottalized as [ʼm, ʼn, ʼl, ʼj, ʼw].

=== Vowels ===
Vowels in Nocten
	Front	Back
Close	i	u
Mid	e	o
Open	a	ɑ

No contrasts between vowels with respect to lip roundedness exist. Vowel length is considered prosodic.

=== Phonotactics ===
CV syllable structure is the most common in Weenhayek. Word-final syllables must end in a consonant, typically with the form CVC.

== See also ==
- Wichí Lhamtés Vejoz
- Wichí Lhamtés Güisnay
