= Wichí =

South American Indigenous group of mataco-mataguaya origin

- Flag of the Wichí people

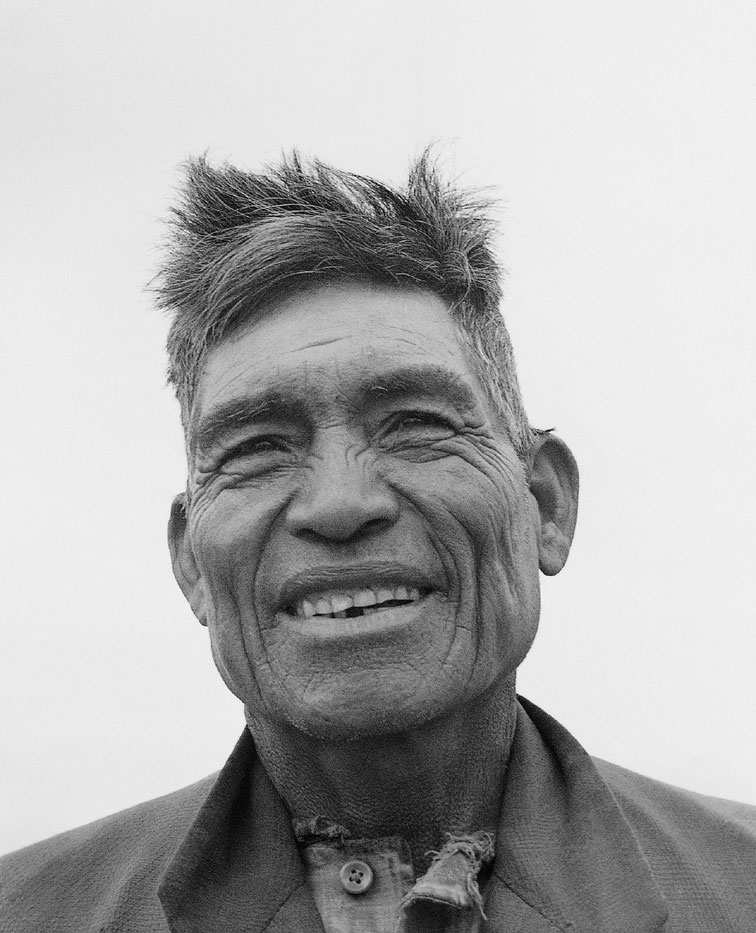
- Wichí man, 1964

Total population
- 55,734

Regions with significant populations
- Argentina, Bolivia
- Argentina: 50,419 (2010)
- Bolivia: 5,315

Languages
- Wichí languages (Wichí Lhamtés Vejoz, Wichí Lhamtés Güisnay, Wichí Lhamtés Nocten), Spanish

Religion
- Traditional tribal religion

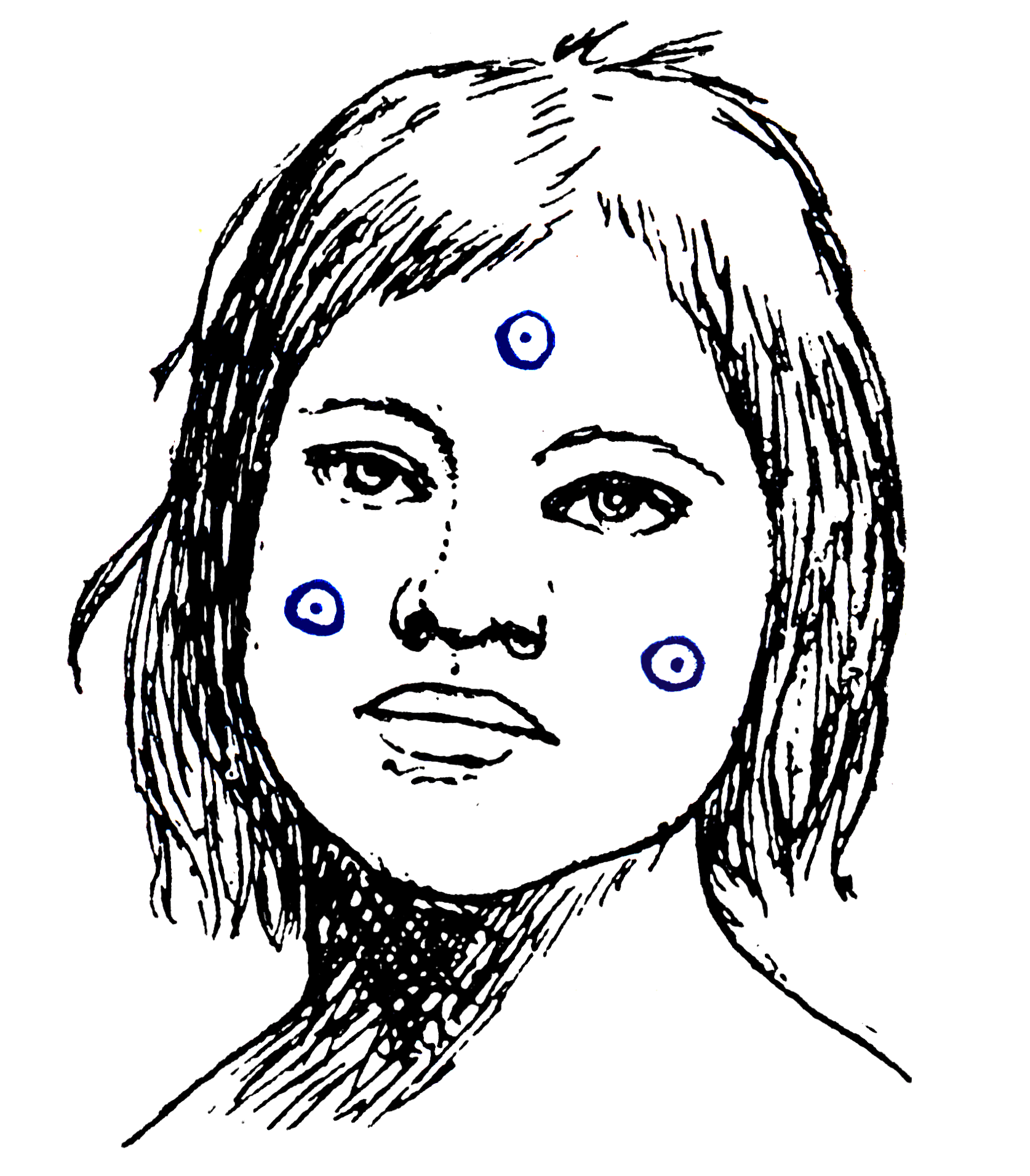
Illustration of a Wichí man with tattoos by Erland Nordenskiöld, 1912

The Wichí are an Indigenous people of South America. They comprise a large group of tribes inhabiting the headwaters of the Bermejo and Pilcomayo rivers in Argentina and Bolivia.

== Notes on designation ==
This ethnic group was referred to by English settlers as Mataco, a term that is still widely used. The etymology of this term is obscure; however, several sources note that the Wichí consider it derogatory. Among the Wichí, a folk etymology relates the term to the Spanish verb matar ("to kill").

Their preferred self-designation is Wichí, meaning "people" (Wichí Lhamtés Güisnay pronunciation: [wiˈkʲi]), and their language is known as Wichí Lhamtés ([wikʲi l̥amˈtes]).

In some areas of Bolivia, there is a pronunciation variant [wikˠiʡ], and the group refers to themselves as Weenhayek Wichí, translated by Alvarsson (1988) as "the different people" (plural: Weenhayey). According to Weenhayey informants interviewed by Alvarsson, the original name was Olhamelh ([oɬameɬ]), meaning simply "us."

Subgroups within the Wichí have been identified and referred to by different names in the literature: Nocten or Octenay in Bolivia; Véjos, more properly Wejwus or Wehwos, for the western subgroup(s); and Güisnay for the eastern subgroups in Argentina. The latter corresponds to Tewoq-lhelej, meaning "the river people."

== Population ==
At present, various Wichí groups can be found in Argentina and Bolivia, distributed as follows:

Argentina:

- Eighteen groups are located in the northwest of Chaco Province, approximately 180 km northwest of the town of Castelli.
- Many communities are found in Formosa Province, in the departments of Bermejo (15 communities), Matacos (10 communities), Patiño (7 communities), and Ramón Lista (33 communities).
- Additional communities are present in Salta Province, in the departments of San Martín (21 communities), Rivadavia (57 communities, some consisting of only a few individuals), Orán, Metán (2 communities), and Anta (3 communities); the latter three are more isolated.
- In Jujuy Province, communities are found in the departments of Santa Bárbara, San Pedro, and Ledesma.

Bolivia:

In Bolivia, Wichí communities are found in Gran Chaco Province, Tarija Department, along the Pilcomayo River. Fourteen communities are located in the area extending from the town of Villa Montes to D'Orbigny, near the Argentine border.

Ethnologue reports:

- Wichí Lhamtés Güisnay / Pilcomayo Wichí: 27,000 speakers in Argentina (2021).
- Wichí Lhamtés Nocten: 1,900 speakers in Bolivia (2012).
- Wichí Lhamtés Vejoz / Bermejo Wichí: 32,000 speakers in Argentina (2021).

== Languages ==
Versions of Wichí are the most widely spoken languages of the Matacoan language family. The Wichí language comprises three main varieties:

- Wichí Lhamtés Vejoz
- Wichí Lhamtés Güisnay
- Wichí Lhamtés Nocten.

The total number of speakers can only be estimated, as no fully reliable figures exist. According to the Argentine National Institute of Statistics and Censuses (INDEC), there are 36,135 speakers in Argentina alone. In Rosario, Argentina's third-largest city, there is a community of approximately 10,000 Wichí people, all fluent in the language, including some native speakers. Multiple bilingual primary schools serve this community.

In Bolivia, Alvarsson estimated between 1,700 and 2,000 speakers in 1988; a census later reported 1,912 speakers, while Diez Astete and Riester (1996) estimated between 2,300 and 2,600 Weenhayek living in sixteen communities.

According to Najlis (1968) and Gordon (2005), three main dialects can be distinguished within Wichí: southwestern or Vejós (Wehwós), northeastern or Güisnay (Weenhayek), and northwestern or Nocten (Oktenay). Tovar (1981) and other authors identify only two dialects (northeastern and southwestern), whereas Braunstein (1992–1993) describes eleven ethnical subgroups.

The Wichí language is predominantly suffixing and polysynthetic; verbal words can contain between two and fifteen morphemes. It distinguishes between alienable and inalienable possession. The phonological inventory is extensive, including simple, glottalized, and aspirated stops and sonorants. The number of vowels varies by dialect (five or six).

The Anglican Church, particularly Bishop David Leake and his father, missionary Alfred Leake, played a significant role in developing a written form of the Wichí language to record stories and foundational myths. Many Wichí people are Christian, and Bishop Leake, with the support of the Bible Society, translated the entire Old and New Testaments into Wichí, enabling the community to read and hear the scriptures in their own language.

== History ==
Much of what is known about the history of the Wichí comes from accounts by Jesuit and Franciscan missionaries in the 17th and 18th centuries. The first mission was established in 1690 but was unsuccessful. In 1771, the Franciscan Mission of Zenta received a more favorable reception; however, with the decline of Spanish power, these missions eventually fell into decay.

The Anglican Church has been closely involved with the Wichí since the early 20th century. There are currently over 140 churches in the region, which are attended almost exclusively by indigenous families. Many priests of the Anglican Church in northern Argentina are from indigenous communities, and three bishops of the Anglican Diocese of Northern Argentina have been indigenous, including members of the Wichí (see Diocese of Northern Argentina; Anglican Indigenous Network).

The Wichí territory has shifted since the 18th century, when the first precise records of their existence and location were documented. In the Pilcomayo River area, their neighbors were the Toba, and their lands along the Bermejo River extended from the present-day town of Embarcación to an area north of the current town of Castelli, in Chaco Province.

The Anglican Diocese of Northern Argentina has advocated for Wichí land rights for over a century, mediating between the provincial governments of Formosa and Salta in efforts to secure indigenous land claims. For more than fifty years, the Anglican Church privately purchased land to allow indigenous communities to live there, as the national government had long refused to acknowledge Wichí land or human rights. In February 2020, the Inter-American Court of Human Rights ruled against the Argentine government in a landmark case, ordering reparations, restitution of land, and the restoration of fishing rights to indigenous communities. ASOCIANA, an ecological charity affiliated with the Anglican Church, has played a significant role in this process and in documenting ecological crimes committed by private corporations and government groups.

According to Father Alejandro Corrado, a Franciscan missionary in Tarija, the Wichí were traditionally nomadic, living in light structures scattered throughout the forest. Corrado wrote that their diet relied primarily on fish and algarroba (the fruit of the algarrobo tree, commonly identified with Prosopis alba or South American mesquite), as well as honey-locust. He described them as eating "anything that was not poisonous, even rats and grasshoppers." From algarroba, they reportedly prepared an intoxicating beverage, likely aloja, made by fermenting the sugary paste (patay) found inside the fruit. The ripening of algarroba was marked by a ceremonial celebration.

Corrado also noted that among the Wichí, "everything is in common." There was a clear division of labor: men primarily engaged in fishing and occasional hunting with bows or clubs, while women carried out most other tasks.

Regarding spiritual beliefs, Corrado reported that Wichí shamans, or medicine men, fought disease "with singing and rattles," and that the Wichí believed in both a good spirit and an evil spirit, with the souls of the deceased reincarnating in animals. There is also evidence of the use of the entheogen Anadenanthera colubrina by Wichí shamans in Argentina.

The Pentecostal Church of Sweden began working among the Wichí community in the early 20th century, leading to a Christian majority among the Weenhayek population. The absence of concepts of individual possession and ownership within the community facilitated this conversion; everything was traditionally held in common, aligning with descriptions of the early Christian church. Other factors helped contextualize the gospel, such as the Weenhayek's identity as fishermen on the Pilcomayo River, similar to several disciples in the Bible. These cultural connections have allowed the Weenhayek to maintain their unique identity and traditions despite adopting Christianity.

== Current threats ==
The Wichí have traditionally depended on hunting, fishing, and small-scale agriculture for their subsistence. Since the beginning of the 20th century, significant portions of their ancestral lands have been taken over by outsiders. Areas that were once grasslands have undergone desertification as a result of deforestation, cattle ranching, and, more recently, the introduction of non-native crops such as soybeans. A 1998 study by a graduate student from Clark University (Worcester, MA), based on satellite imagery, showed that between 1984 and 1996, 20% of the forest was lost.

The Wichí were also affected by the economic recession from 1999 to 2002. However, their economic self-sufficiency, physical isolation, and the general lack of governmental recognition mitigated the impact. The crisis primarily resulted in price increases for goods they do not produce themselves (such as sugar and red meat, which they often substitute with wild honey and fish) and disruptions in the supply of medicines and healthcare services.

For many years, the Wichí have struggled to obtain legal title to their ancestral lands, which have been repeatedly seized and fenced off by non-Indigenous cattle ranchers and farmers. Their land claims center on two large public land areas in eastern Salta Province, known as Lote 55 (approximately 2,800 km²) and Lote 14. While their rights to these lands have been recognized by law, the Salta provincial government has taken no practical enforcement measures.

In early 2004, the government of Salta decided to revoke the protected status of the General Pizarro Natural Reserve, an area of 250 km² in Anta Department inhabited by approximately 100 Wichí people, and to sell part of the land to two private companies, Everest SA and Initium Aferro SA, for deforestation and soybean cultivation. Following months of protests, legal challenges, and a campaign supported by Greenpeace, on 29 September 2005 — after the issue was covered on a popular television program — a group of Argentine artists, actors, musicians, models, environmental organizations, and Wichí representatives arranged a meeting with Chief of Cabinet Alberto Fernández, Director of the National Parks Administration Héctor Espina, and President Néstor Kirchner. The national government promised to discuss the matter with Salta Governor Juan Carlos Romero.

On 14 October 2005, the National Parks Administration and the government of Salta signed an agreement to create a new national protected area in General Pizarro. Of the approximately 213 km² included in the new reserve, the Wichí were granted use rights over 22 km² and ownership of 8 km².

El Chaco, where many Wichí also live, is the largest remaining subtropical dry broadleaf forest in the world. Currently, the Wichí and other Indigenous groups face the threat of losing their land and livelihoods to expanding agribusinesses operations. Soy and cotton farmers have cleared vast areas of forest to increase cultivation. The Chaco forest is being deforested at a rate six times faster than that of the Amazon rainforest, with logging companies among the primary profiteers. In addition, soy cultivation has further accelerated deforestation and led to the use of large quantities of fertilizers and pesticides, which contaminate the water sources on which Indigenous communities depend.

Since 2008, many Indigenous people have organized through the Movimiento Nacional Campesino Indígena (National Movement of Indigenous Peasants) to fight for legal recognition of their land rights.

== Wichí society ==
The Wichí, like other hunter-gatherer peoples, have traditionally been semi-nomadic. Even today, despite significant transculturation, a considerable number of montaraces (nomadic) communities or clans continue this way of life. Each Wichí village has its own territory, though several communities often share overlapping areas. Each community consists of one or more clans.

Wichí society is matrilocal; individuals belong to their mothers' clans, and upon marriage, men move to their wives' villages. Individuals and families from neighboring peoples—such as the Iyojwaja (Chorote), Nivaklé, Qomlek (Toba), and Tapy'y (Tapieté)—often live among the Wichí, sometimes marrying into their society.

The Wichí typically build small mud houses with roofs made of leaves and branches, structures that are well adapted to the high summer temperatures, which can reach up to 50 °C (120 °F). During the dry season (winter), they rely on fishing in the Bermejo and Pilcomayo rivers. In summer, they cultivate crops such as corn, pumpkins, beans, and watermelons.

Throughout the year, the Wichí hunt various animals, including deer (such as Mazama goauzoubira and Mazama americana), armadillos (Dasypus, Tolypeutes, and Euphractus), rabbits (Sylvilagus brasiliensis), iguanas, and peccaries (Tayassu albirostris and Tayassu tajacu). They also gather wild honey and collect fruits.

For centuries, the Wichí have used the strong fibers of chaguar (Bromelia serra, Bromelia hieronymi) to weave nets, bags, and other textile items; in some communities, the sale of chaguar handicrafts represents a significant part of the local economy.

The most popular traditional game among the Wichí is a team sport known as yaj ha'lä, which resembles lacrosse. Matches usually last from dawn to dusk without interruption and are organized between clans. While the original cultural significance of the game has been lost, it remains a focus of intense gambling, with rival clans betting animals, clothing, seeds, and horses on the outcome.

== See also ==
- Hamilton's Pharmacopeia
