= List of Theraphosidae species =

This page lists all described genera and species of the spider family Theraphosidae. As of August 2022, the World Spider Catalog accepted 1192 species in 186 genera:

== A ==
=== Abdomegaphobema ===
Abdomegaphobema Sherwood, Gabriel, Peñaherrera-R., Léon-E., Cisneros-Heredia, Brescovit & Lucas, 2023

- Abdomegaphobema mesomelas O. Pickard-Cambridge, 1892 - Costa Rica
- Abdomegaphobema peterklaasi (Schmidt, 1994) - Costa Rica

=== Acanthopelma ===
Acanthopelma F. O. Pickard-Cambridge, 1897

- Acanthopelma beccarii Caporiacco, 1947 - Guyana
- Acanthopelma rufescens F. O. Pickard-Cambridge, 1897 (type) - Central America

=== Acanthoscurria ===
Acanthoscurria

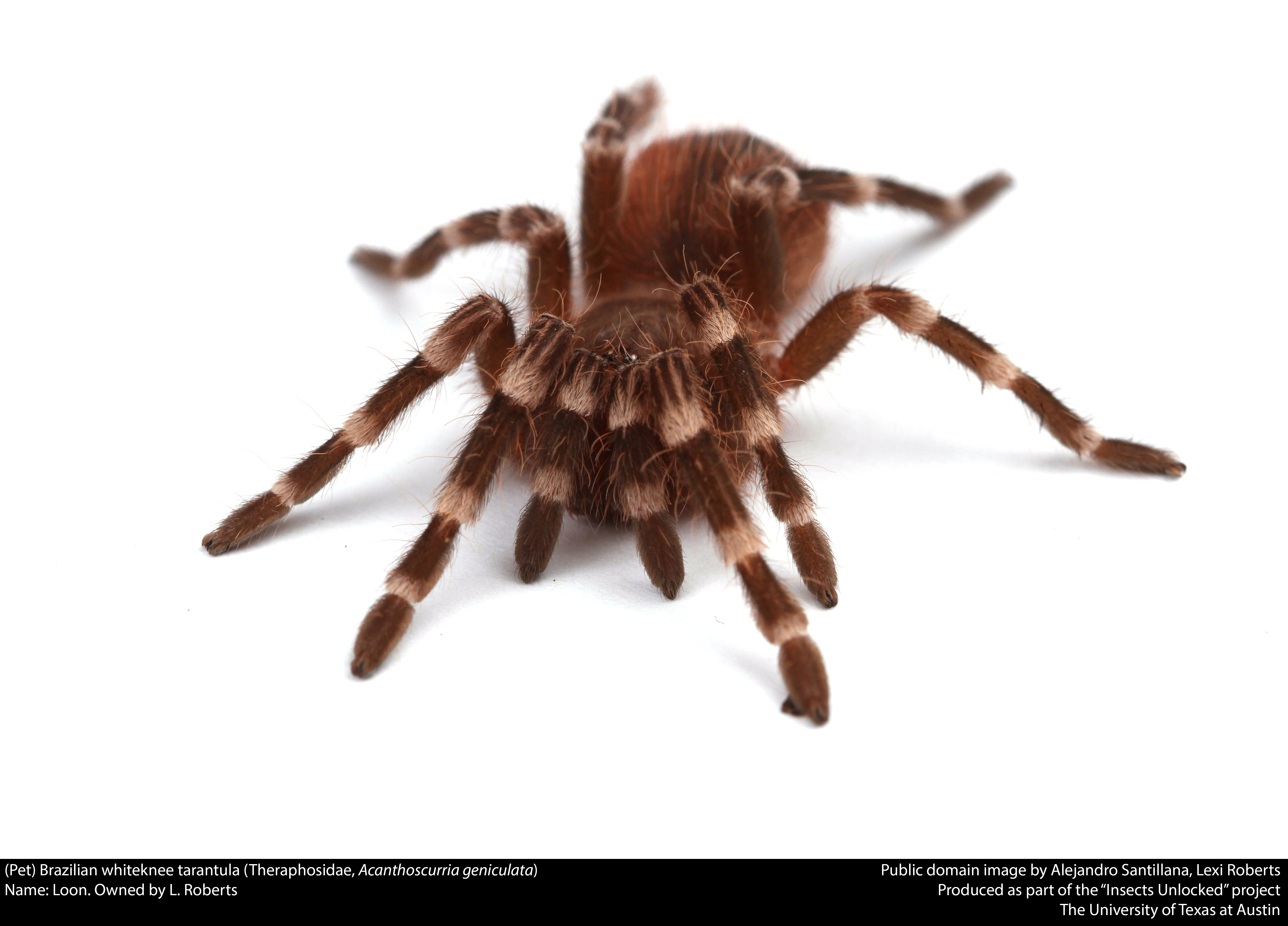
Brazilian white knee tarantula
(Acanthoscurria geniculata)

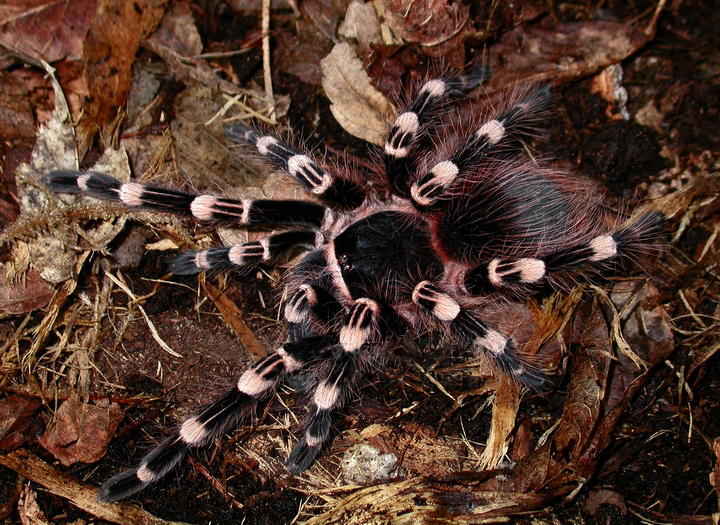
Acanthoscurria geniculata

Acanthoscurria Ausserer, 1871

- Acanthoscurria armasi Sherwood, Gabriel, Peñaherrera-R. & Alayón, 2025 - Colombia
- Acanthoscurria belterrensis Paula, Gabriel, Indicatti, Brescovit & Lucas, 2014 - Brazil
- Acanthoscurria chacoana Brèthes, 1909 - Brazil, Bolivia, Paraguay, Argentina
- Acanthoscurria cordubensis Thorell, 1894 - Argentina
- Acanthoscurria geniculata (C. L. Koch, 1841) (type) - Brazil
- Acanthoscurria gomesiana Mello-Leitão, 1923 - Brazil
- Acanthoscurria insubtilis Simon, 1892 - Bolivia, Brazil
- Acanthoscurria juruenicola Mello-Leitão, 1923 - Brazil
- Acanthoscurria maga Simon, 1892 - South America
- Acanthoscurria melloleitaoi Bertani, 2023 - Brazil
- Acanthoscurria musculosa Simon, 1892 - Bolivia
- Acanthoscurria natalensis Chamberlin, 1917 - Brazil
- Acanthoscurria paulensis Mello-Leitão, 1923 - Brazil
- Acanthoscurria rhodothele Mello-Leitão, 1923 - Brazil
- Acanthoscurria simoensi Vol, 2000 - French Guiana, Brazil
- Acanthoscurria tarda Pocock, 1903 - Brazil
- Acanthoscurria theraphosoides (Doleschall, 1871) - Peru, Bolivia, Brazil, French Guiana
- Acanthoscurria turumban Rodríguez-Manzanilla & Bertani, 2010 - Venezuela
- Acanthoscurria urens Vellard, 1924 - Brazil

=== Acentropelma ===
Acentropelma Pocock, 1901

- Acentropelma gutzkei (Reichling, 1997) - Colombia
- Acentropelma spinulosum (F. O. Pickard-Cambridge, 1897) (type) - Guatemala

=== Aenigmarachne ===
Aenigmarachne Schmidt, 2005

- Aenigmarachne colombiana Osorio, Polo, Sabbatino & Martínez, 2025 - Colombia
- Aenigmarachne sinapophysis Schmidt, 2005 (type) - Costa Rica

=== Agnostopelma ===
Agnostopelma Pérez-Miles & Weinmann, 2010

- Agnostopelma gardel Pérez-Miles & Weinmann, 2010 - Colombia
- Agnostopelma tota Pérez-Miles & Weinmann, 2010 (type) - Colombia

=== Aguapanela ===
Aguapanela Perafán & Cifuentes, 2015

- Aguapanela arvi Perafán, Cifuentes & Estrada, 2015 (type) - Colombia

=== Amazonius ===
Amazonius Cifuentes & Bertani, 2022

- Amazonius elenae (Schmidt, 1994) - Ecuador, Brazil
- Amazonius germani Cifuentes & Bertani, 2022 - French Guiana, Brazil
- Amazonius giovaninii Cifuentes & Bertani, 2022 - Brazil
- Amazonius subcaeruleus (Bauer & Antonelli, 1997) - Columbia, Ecuador, Venezuela

=== Annandaliella ===
Annandaliella

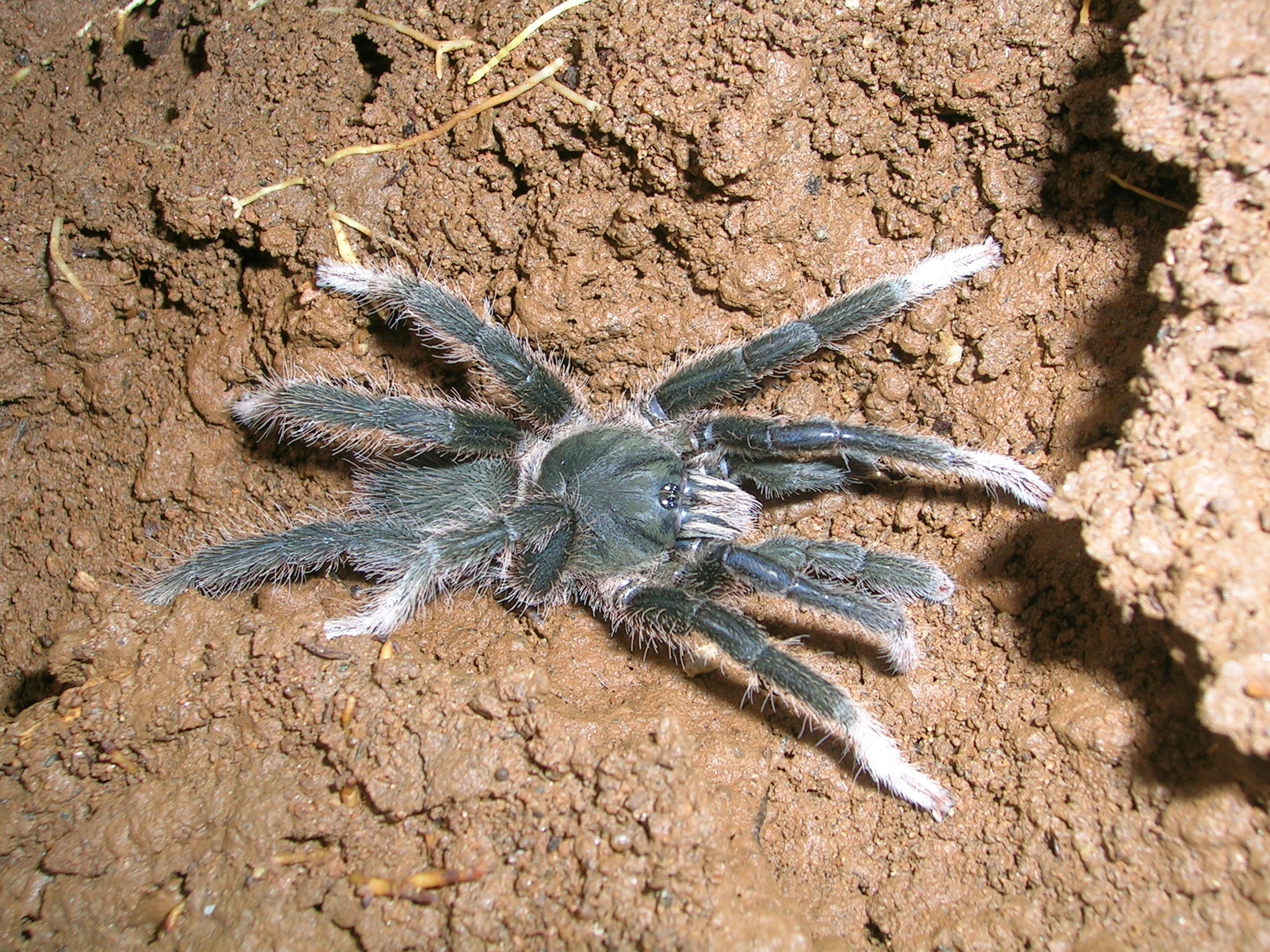
Annandaliella travancorica

Annandaliella Hirst, 1909

- Annandaliella ernakulamensis Sunil Jose & Sebastian, 2008 - India
- Annandaliella pectinifera Gravely, 1935 - India
- Annandaliella travancorica Hirst, 1909 (type) - India

=== Anoploscelus ===
Anoploscelus Pocock, 1897

- Anoploscelus celeripes Pocock, 1897 (type) - Uganda, Tanzania
- Anoploscelus lesserti Laurent, 1946 - Rwanda

=== Anqasha ===
Anqasha Sherwood & Gabriel, 2022

- Anqasha lima Sherwood, Peñaherrera-R., Gabriel, León-E., Rollard, Leguin, Brescovit & Lucas, 2025 - Peru
- Anqasha minaperinensis Kaderka, 2023 - Peru
- Anqasha picta (Pocock, 1903) - Peru

=== Antikuna ===
Antikuna Kaderka, Ferretti, West, Lüddecke & Hüsser, 2021

- Antikuna cernickai Kaderka, Ferretti & Lüddecke, 2021 - Peru
- Antikuna cimrmani Kaderka, Ferretti & Hüsser, 2021 - Peru
- Antikuna cyanofemur Kaderka, Ferretti & Hüsser, 2021 - Peru
- Antikuna majkusi Kaderka, Ferretti & Lüddecke, 2021 - Peru
- Antikuna sapallanga Kaderka, Ferretti & Lüddecke, 2021 - Peru
- Antikuna urayrumi Ferretti, Kaderka & West, 2021 - Peru
- Antikuna valladaresi Ferretti, Kaderka & West, 2021 - Peru

=== Antillena ===
Antillena Bertani, Huff & Fukushima, 2017

- Antillena miguelangeli Santos & Bertani, 2024 - Dominican Rep.
- Antillena rickwesti (Bertani & Huff, 2013) - Dominican Rep.

=== Aphonopelma ===
Aphonopelma

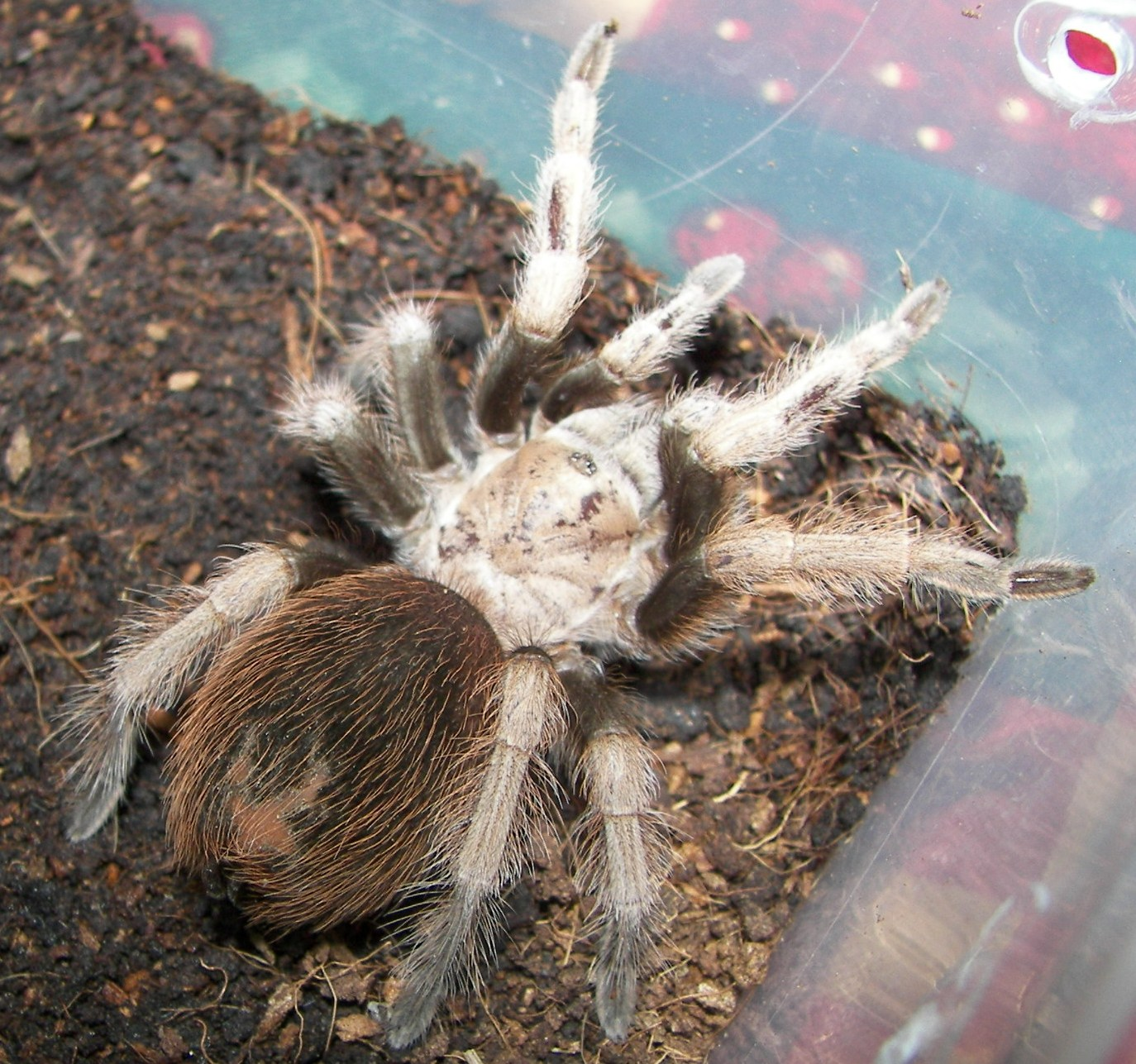
Western desert tarantula
(Aphonopelma chalcodes)

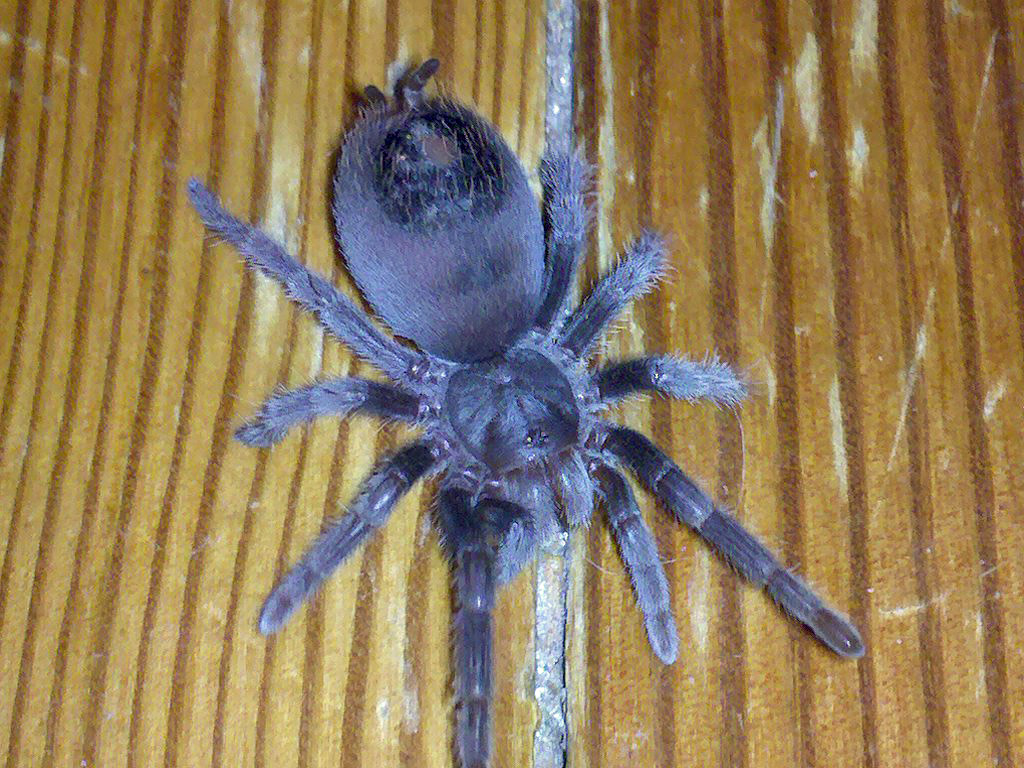
Aphonopelma marxi

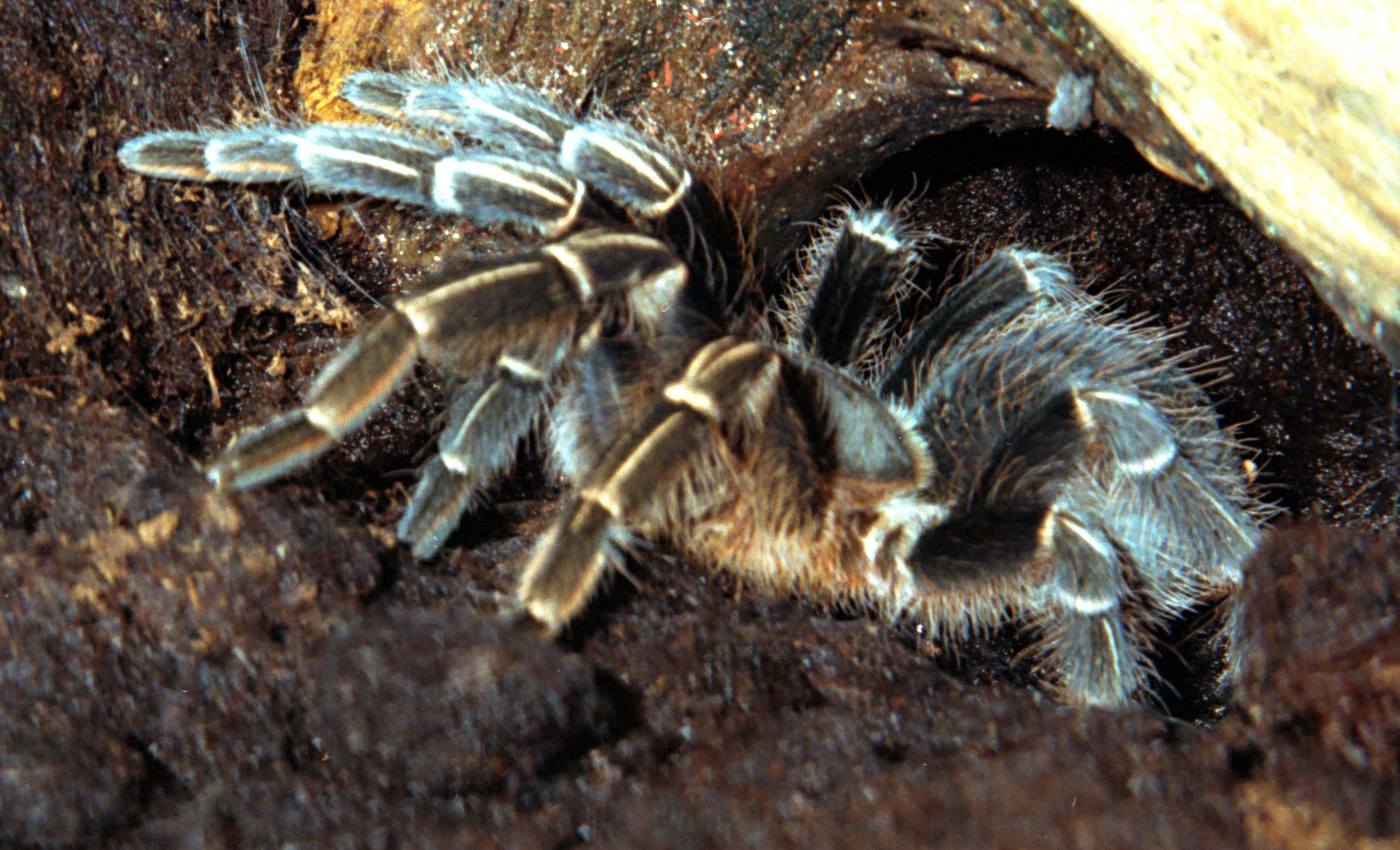
Costa Rican zebra tarantula
(Aphonopelma seemanni)

Aphonopelma Pocock, 1901

- Aphonopelma anax (Chamberlin, 1940) – United States, Mexico
- Aphonopelma armada (Chamberlin, 1940) – United States
- Aphonopelma atomicum Hamilton, 2016 – United States
- Aphonopelma bacadehuachi Hendrixson, 2019 – Mexico
- Aphonopelma belindae Gabriel, 2011 – Panama
- Aphonopelma bicoloratum Struchen, Brändle & Schmidt, 1996 – Mexico
- Aphonopelma burica Valerio, 1980 – Costa Rica
- Aphonopelma caniceps (Simon, 1891) – Mexico
- Aphonopelma catalina Hamilton, Hendrixson & Bond, 2016 – United States
- Aphonopelma chalcodes Chamberlin, 1940 – United States
- Aphonopelma chiricahua Hamilton, Hendrixson & Bond, 2016 – United States
- Aphonopelma cookei Smith, 1995 – Mexico
- Aphonopelma crinirufum (Valerio, 1980) – Costa Rica
- Aphonopelma eustathes (Chamberlin, 1940) – Mexico
- Aphonopelma eutylenum Chamberlin, 1940 – United States
- Aphonopelma gabeli Smith, 1995 – United States
- Aphonopelma geotoma (Chamberlin, 1937) – Mexico
- Aphonopelma gertschi Smith, 1995 – Mexico
- Aphonopelma griseum Chamberlin, 1940 – Mexico
- Aphonopelma hageni (Strand, 1906) – Mexico
- Aphonopelma helluo (Simon, 1891) – Mexico
- Aphonopelma hentzi (Girard, 1852) – United States
- Aphonopelma icenoglei Hamilton, Hendrixson & Bond, 2016 – United States
- Aphonopelma iodius (Chamberlin & Ivie, 1939) – United States
- Aphonopelma jacobii Hamilton & Hendrixson, 2024 - United States
- Aphonopelma johnnycashi Hamilton, 2016 – United States
- Aphonopelma joshua Prentice, 1997 – United States
- Aphonopelma levii Smith, 1995 – Mexico
- Aphonopelma madera Hamilton, Hendrixson & Bond, 2016 – United States
- Aphonopelma mareki Hamilton, Hendrixson & Bond, 2016 – United States
- Aphonopelma marxi (Simon, 1891) – United States
- Aphonopelma moderatum (Chamberlin & Ivie, 1939) – United States
- Aphonopelma moellendorfi Hamilton, 2016 – United States
- Aphonopelma mojave Prentice, 1997 – United States
- Aphonopelma mooreae Smith, 1995 – Mexico
- Aphonopelma nayaritum Chamberlin, 1940 – Mexico
- Aphonopelma pallidum (F. O. Pickard-Cambridge, 1897) – Mexico
- Aphonopelma paloma Prentice, 1993 – United States
- Aphonopelma parvum Hamilton, Hendrixson & Bond, 2016 – United States
- Aphonopelma peloncillo Hamilton, Hendrixson & Bond, 2016 – United States
- Aphonopelma phasmus Chamberlin, 1940 – United States
- Aphonopelma platnicki Smith, 1995 – Mexico
- Aphonopelma prenticei Hamilton, Hendrixson & Bond, 2016 – United States
- Aphonopelma prosoicum Chamberlin, 1940 – Mexico
- Aphonopelma ruedanum Chamberlin, 1940 – Mexico
- Aphonopelma saguaro Hamilton, 2016 – United States
- Aphonopelma sclerothrix (Valerio, 1980) – Costa Rica
- Aphonopelma seemanni (F. O. Pickard-Cambridge, 1897) (type species) – Central America
- Aphonopelma steindachneri (Ausserer, 1875) – United States
- Aphonopelma superstitionense Hamilton, Hendrixson & Bond, 2016 – United States
- Aphonopelma truncatum (F. O. Pickard-Cambridge, 1897) – Mexico
- Aphonopelma vorhiesi (Chamberlin & Ivie, 1939) – United States
- Aphonopelma xanthochromum (Valerio, 1980) – Costa Rica
- Aphonopelma xwalxwal Hamilton, 2016 – United States

=== Arboriticus ===
Arboriticus Borges & Bertani, 2025

- Arboriticus celsoi Borges & Bertani, 2025 (type species)
- Arboriticus giganteus Borges & Bertani, 2025
- Arboriticus maculatus Borges, Abegg & Bertani, 2025
- Arboriticus minor Borges & Bertani, 2025
- Arboriticus petropolis Borges & Bertani, 2025
- Arboriticus spinosissimus (Mello-Leitão, 1923)
- Arboriticus tarsicrassus (Bücherl, 1947)

=== Aspinochilus ===
Aspinochilus Müller, Fardiansah, Schneider, Wanke, von Wirth & Wendt, 2024

- Aspinochilus rufus Müller, Fardiansah, Schneider, Wanke, von Wirth & Wendt, 2024 - Indonesia

=== Augacephalus ===
Augacephalus Gallon, 2002

- Augacephalus breyeri (Hewitt, 1919) (type) - South Africa, Mozambique, Eswatini
- Augacephalus ezendami (Gallon, 2001) - Mozambique
- Augacephalus junodi (Simon, 1904) - East, South Africa

=== Avicularia ===
Avicularia

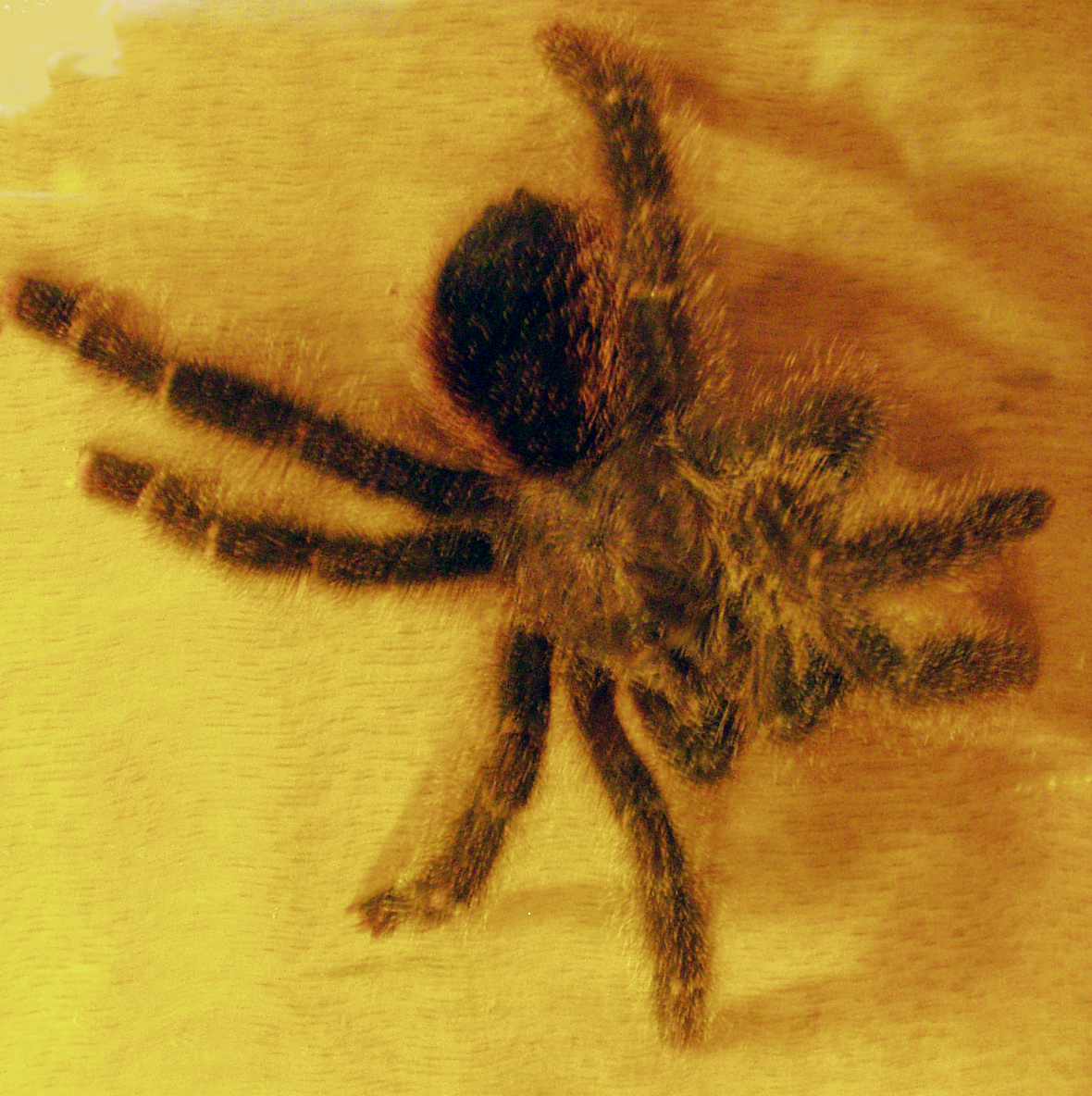
Avicularia bicegoi

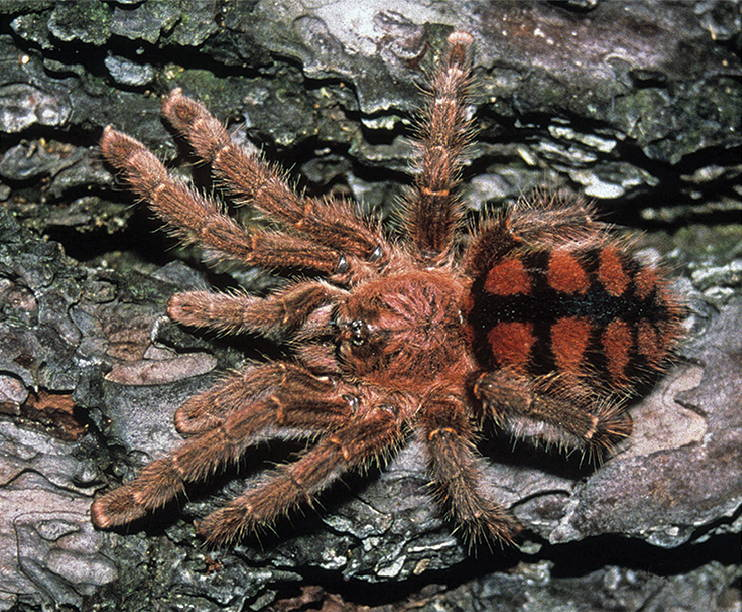
Avicularia minatrix, female

Avicularia Lamarck, 1818

- Avicularia avicularia (Linnaeus, 1758) (type) - Venezuela, Guyana, Suriname, French Guiana, Trinidad and Tobago, Brazil, Peru, Bolivia
- Avicularia caei Fukushima & Bertani, 2017 - Brazil
- Avicularia glauca Simon, 1891 - Panama
- Avicularia hirschii Bullmer, Thierer-Lutz & Schmidt, 2006 - Ecuador, Peru, Brazil
- Avicularia juruensis Mello-Leitão, 1923 - Colombia, Ecuador, Peru, Brazil
- Avicularia lynnae Fukushima & Bertani, 2017 - Peru, Ecuador
- Avicularia merianae Fukushima & Bertani, 2017 - Peru
- Avicularia minatrix Pocock, 1903 - Venezuela, Brazil
- Avicularia purpurea Kirk, 1990 - Colombia, Ecuador, Peru
- Avicularia rufa Schiapelli & Gerschman, 1945 - Ecuador, Peru, Bolivia, Brazil
- Avicularia taunayi (Mello-Leitão, 1920) - Brazil
- Avicularia variegata F. O. Pickard-Cambridge, 1896 - Venezuela, Brazil

== B ==
=== Bacillochilus ===
Bacillochilus Gallon, 2010

- Bacillochilus xenostridulans Gallon, 2010 (type) - Angola

=== Batesiella ===
Batesiella Pocock, 1903

- Batesiella crinita Pocock, 1903 (type) - Cameroon

=== Birupes ===
Birupes Gabriel & Sherwood, 2019

- Birupes simoroxigorum Gabriel & Sherwood, 2019 - Malaysia (Borneo)

=== Bistriopelma ===
Bistriopelma Kaderka, 2015

- Bistriopelma fabianae Quispe-Colca & Kaderka, 2020 - Peru
- Bistriopelma kiwicha Nicoletta, Chaparro, Mamani, Ochoa, West & Ferretti, 2020 - Peru
- Bistriopelma lamasi Kaderka, 2015 (type) - Peru
- Bistriopelma matuskai Kaderka, 2015 - Peru
- Bistriopelma peyoi Nicoletta, Chaparro, Mamani, Ochoa, West & Ferretti, 2020 - Peru
- Bistriopelma titicaca Kaderka, 2017 - Peru

=== Bonnetina ===
Bonnetina Vol, 2000

- Bonnetina alagoni Locht & Medina, 2008 - Mexico
- Bonnetina aviae Estrada-Alvarez & Locht, 2011 - Mexico
- Bonnetina cyaneifemur Vol, 2000 (type) - Mexico
- Bonnetina flammigera Ortiz & Francke, 2017 - Mexico
- Bonnetina hijmenseni Ortiz & Francke, 2017 - Mexico
- Bonnetina hobbit Ortiz & Francke, 2017 - Mexico
- Bonnetina julesvernei Ortiz & Francke, 2017 - Mexico
- Bonnetina malinalli Ortiz & Francke, 2017 - Mexico
- Bonnetina megagyna Ortiz & Francke, 2017 - Mexico
- Bonnetina minax Ortiz & Francke, 2017 - Mexico
- Bonnetina papalutlensis Mendoza, 2012 - Mexico
- Bonnetina tanzeri Schmidt, 2012 - Mexico
- Bonnetina tenuiverpis Ortiz & Francke, 2015 - Mexico
- Bonnetina tindoo Ortiz & Francke, 2017 - Mexicoa
- Bonnetina unam Ortiz & Francke, 2017 - Mexico
- Bonnetina vittata Ortiz & Francke, 2017 - Mexico

=== Brachionopus ===
Brachionopus Pocock, 1897

- Brachionopus annulatus Purcell, 1903 - South Africa
- Brachionopus pretoriae Purcell, 1904 - South Africa
- Brachionopus robustus Pocock, 1897 (type) - South Africa
- Brachionopus tristis Purcell, 1903 - South Africa

=== Brachypelma ===
Brachypelma

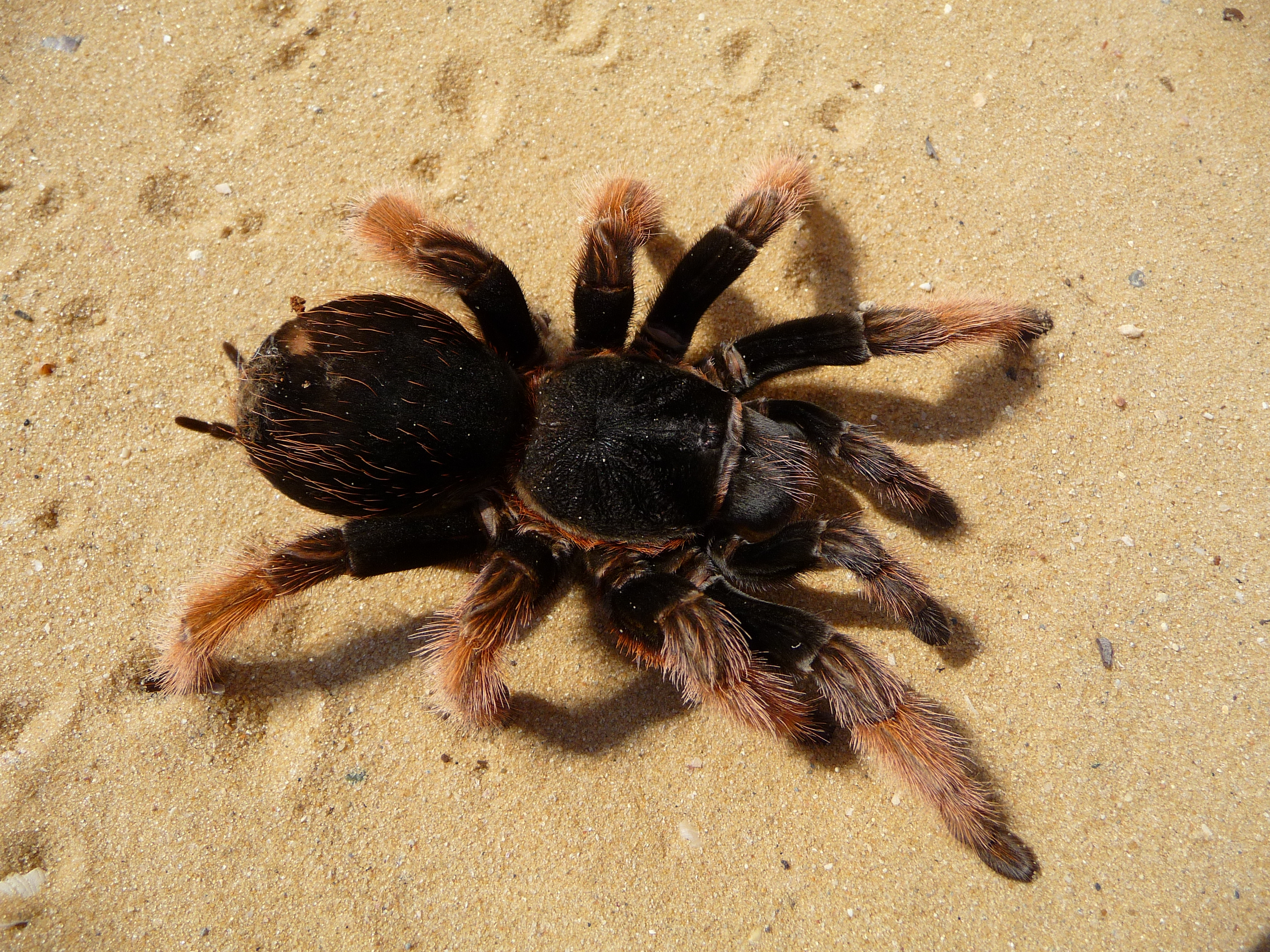
Brachypelma klaasi

Brachypelma Simon, 1891

- Brachypelma albiceps Pocock, 1903 - Mexico
- Brachypelma auratum Schmidt, 1992 - Mexico
- Brachypelma baumgarteni Smith, 1993 - Mexico
- Brachypelma boehmei Schmidt & Klaas, 1993 - Mexico
- Brachypelma emilia (White, 1856) (type) - Mexico
- Brachypelma hamorii Tesmoingt, Cleton & Verdez, 1997 - Mexico
- Brachypelma klaasi (Schmidt & Krause, 1994) - Mexico
- Brachypelma smithi (F. O. Pickard-Cambridge, 1897) - Mexico

=== Bumba ===
Bumba Pérez-Miles, Bonaldo & Miglio, 2014

- Bumba cuiaba Lucas, Passanha & Brescovit, 2020 - Brazil
- Bumba horrida (Schmidt, 1994) - Venezuela, Brazil
- Bumba humilis (Vellard, 1924) - Brazil
- Bumba lennoni Pérez-Miles, Bonaldo & Miglio, 2014 - Brazil
- Bumba mineiros Lucas, Passanha & Brescovit, 2020 - Brazil, Paraguay
- Bumba paunaka Ferretti, 2021 - Bolivia
- Bumba rondonia Lucas, Passanha & Brescovit, 2020 - Brazil
- Bumba tapajos Lucas, Passanha & Brescovit, 2020 - Brazil

== C ==
=== Cardiopelma ===
Cardiopelma Vol, 1999

- Cardiopelma mascatum Vol, 1999 (type) -Mexico

=== Caribena ===
Caribena

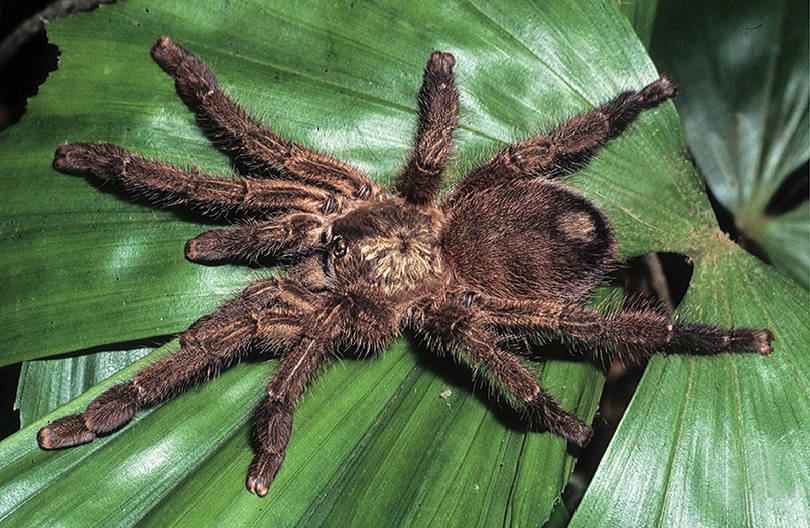
Caribena laeta, female

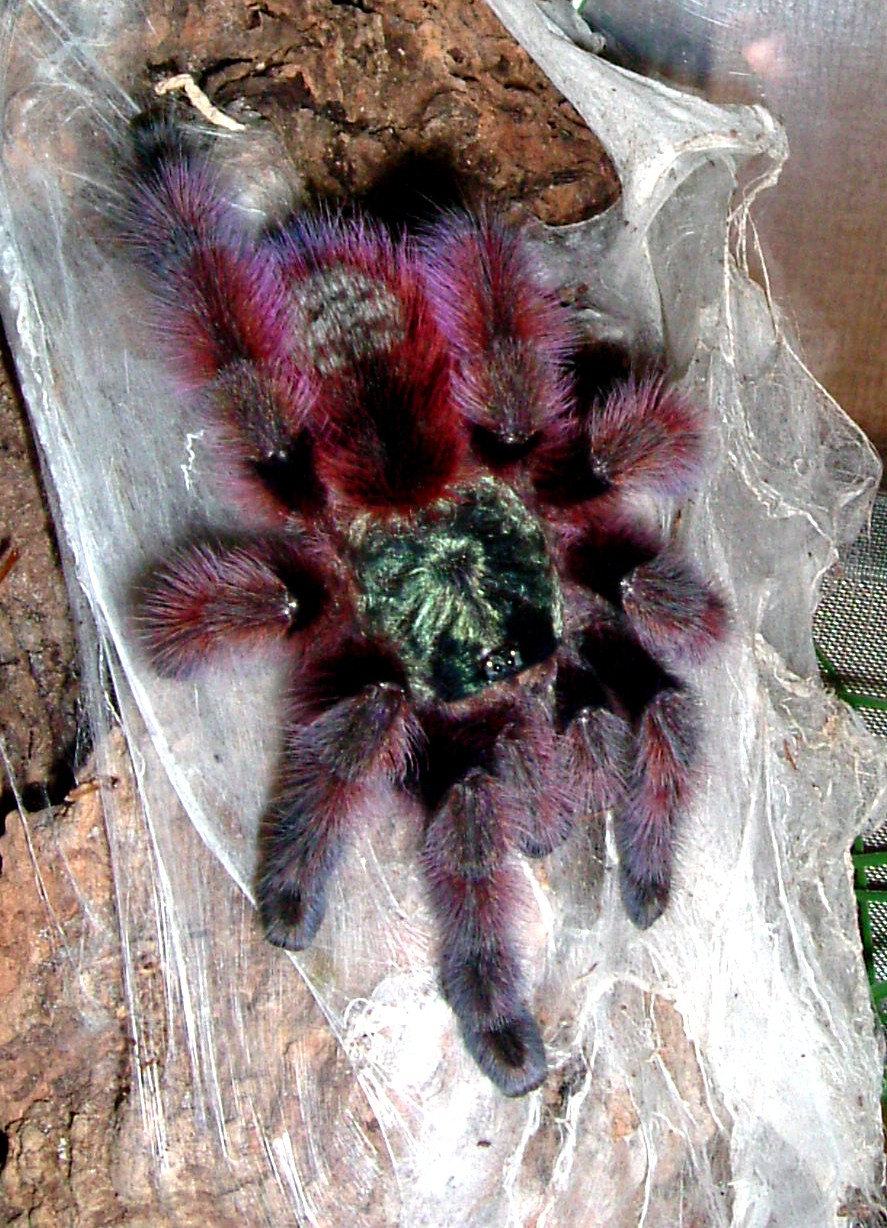
Martinique pinktoe
(Caribena versicolor)

Caribena Fukushima & Bertani, 2017

- Caribena laeta (C. L. Koch, 1842) (type) - Puerto Rico, Cuba, US Virgin Is.
- Caribena versicolor (Walckenaer, 1837) - Martinique

=== Catanduba ===
Catanduba Yamamoto, Lucas & Brescovit, 2012

- Catanduba araguaia Yamamoto, Lucas & Brescovit, 2012 - Brazil
- Catanduba canabrava Yamamoto, Lucas & Brescovit, 2012 - Brazil
- Catanduba flavohirta (Simon, 1889) - Brazil
- Catanduba peruacu Yamamoto, Lucas & Brescovit, 2012 - Brazil
- Catanduba piauiensis Yamamoto, Lucas & Brescovit, 2012 - Brazil
- Catanduba simoni (Soares & Camargo, 1948) - Brazil
- Catanduba tuskae Yamamoto, Lucas & Brescovit, 2012 (type) - Brazil

=== Catumiri ===
Catumiri Guadanucci, 2004

- Catumiri argentinense (Mello-Leitão, 1941) - Chile, Argentina
- Catumiri chicaoi Guadanucci, 2004 - Brazil
- Catumiri parvum (Keyserling, 1878) - Brazil, Uruguay
- Catumiri petropolium Guadanucci, 2004 (type) - Brazil
- Catumiri sapucai (Nicoletta, Panchuk, Peralta-Seen & Ferretti, 2022) – Argentina

=== Ceratogyrus ===
Ceratogyrus

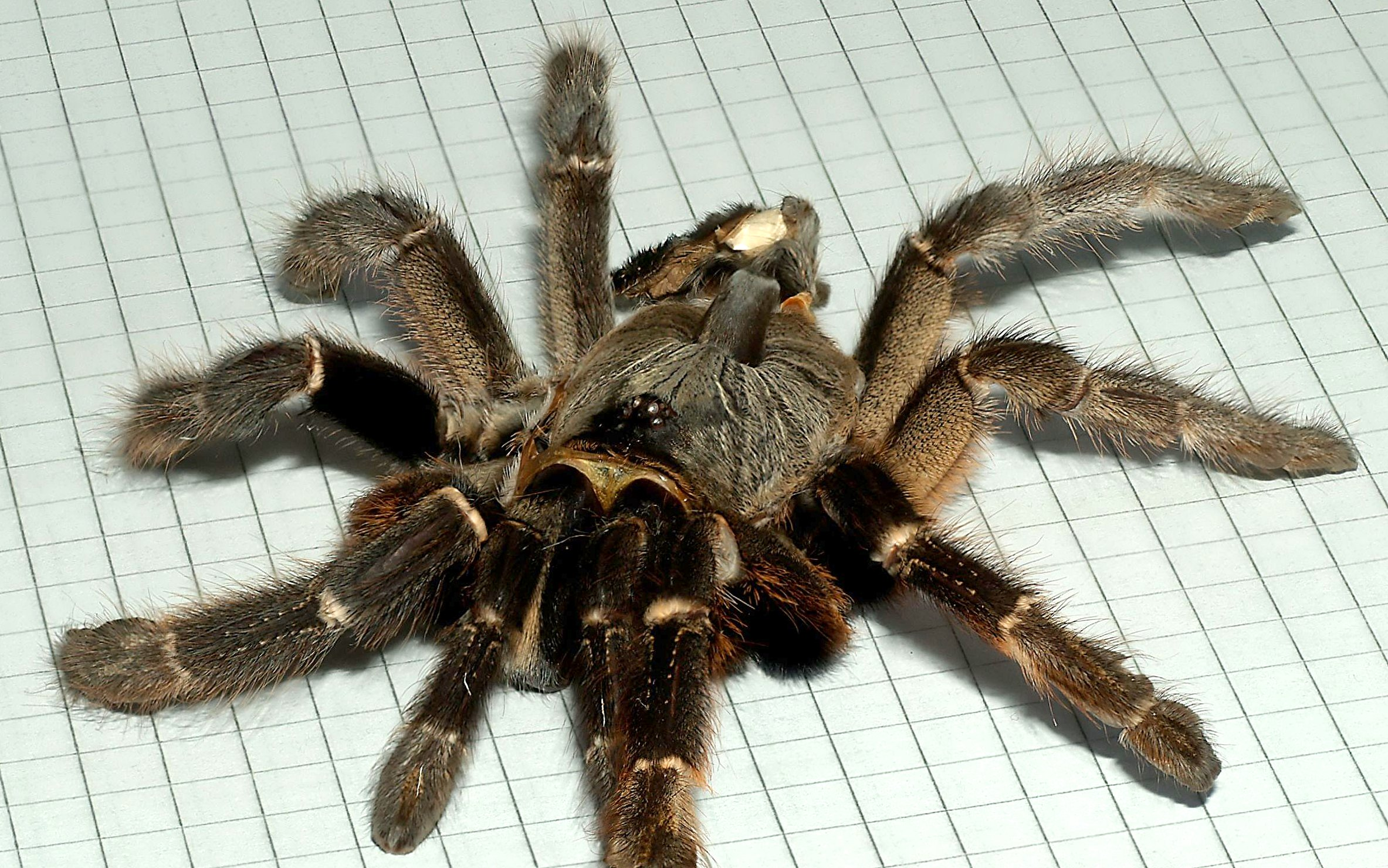
Ceratogyrus darlingi

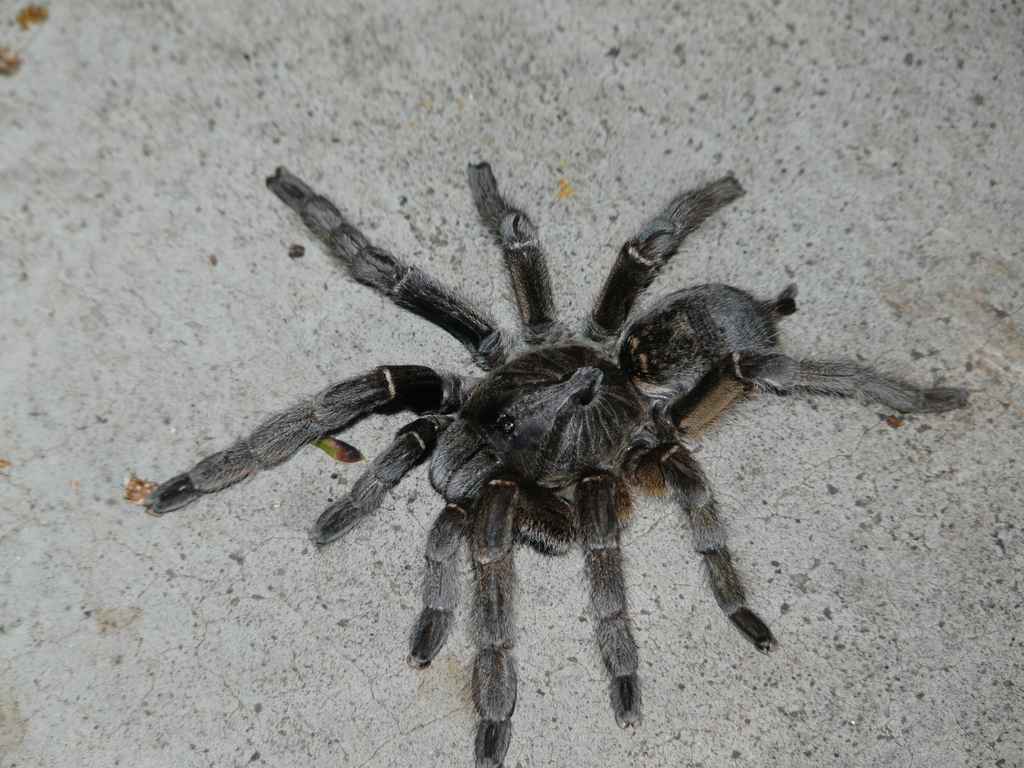
Ceratogyrus dolichocephalus

Ceratogyrus Pocock, 1897

- Ceratogyrus attonitifer Engelbrecht, 2019 - Angola
- Ceratogyrus brachycephalus Hewitt, 1919 - Botswana, Zimbabwe, South Africa
- Ceratogyrus darlingi Pocock, 1897 (type) - Southern Africa
- Ceratogyrus dolichocephalus Hewitt, 1919 - Zimbabwe
- Ceratogyrus hillyardi (Smith, 1990) - Malawi
- Ceratogyrus marshalli Pocock, 1897 - Zimbabwe, Mozambique
- Ceratogyrus meridionalis (Hirst, 1907) - Malawi, Mozambique
- Ceratogyrus paulseni Gallon, 2005 - South Africa
- Ceratogyrus pillansi (Purcell, 1902) - Zimbabwe, Mozambique
- Ceratogyrus sanderi Strand, 1906 - Namibia, Zimbabwe

=== Chaetopelma ===
Chaetopelma

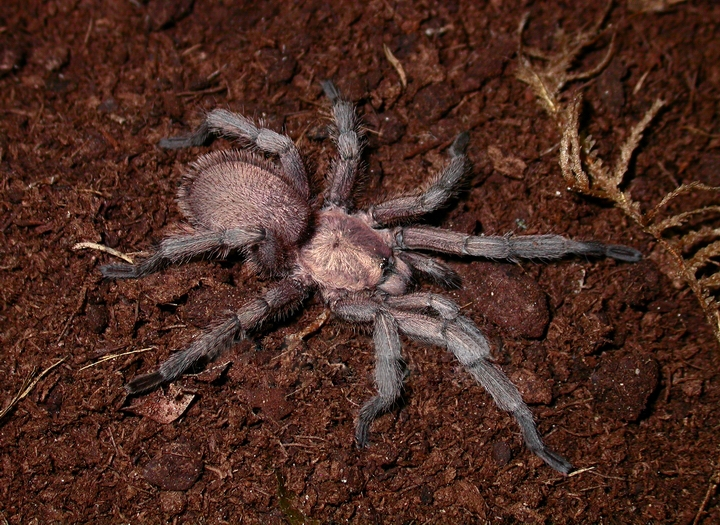
Black furry
(Chaetopelma olivaceum)

Chaetopelma Ausserer, 1871

- Chaetopelma altugkadirorum Gallon, Gabriel & Tansley, 2012 - Turkey, Syria
- Chaetopelma concolor (Simon, 1873) - Turkey, Syria, Egypt
- Chaetopelma karlamani Vollmer, 1997 - Cyprus
- Chaetopelma lymberakisi Chatzaki & Komnenov, 2019 - Greece (Crete)
- Chaetopelma olivaceum (C. L. Koch, 1841) (type) - Cyprus, Turkey, Sudan, Egypt, Middle East
- Chaetopelma turkesi Topçu & Demircan, 2014 - Turkey
- Chaetopelma webborum Smith, 1990 - Cameroon

=== Chilobrachys ===
Chilobrachys

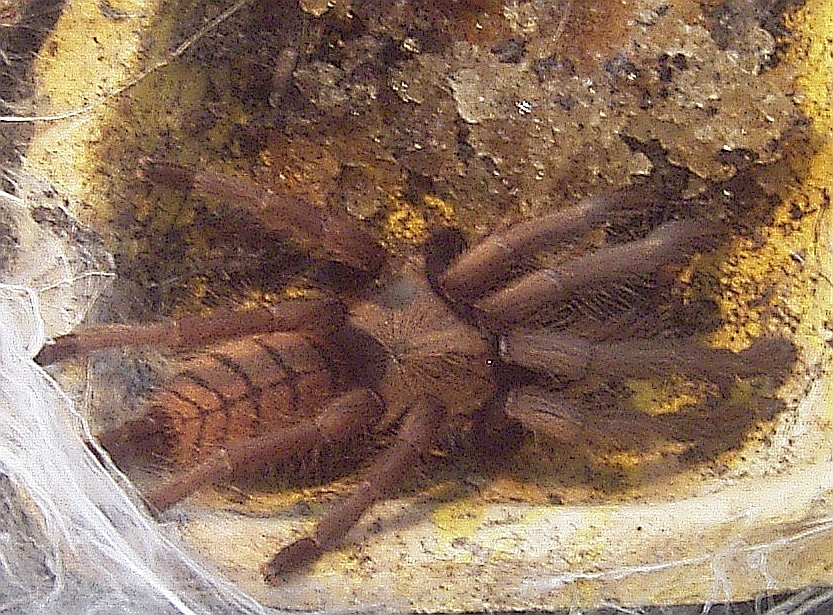
Chilobrachys fimbriatus

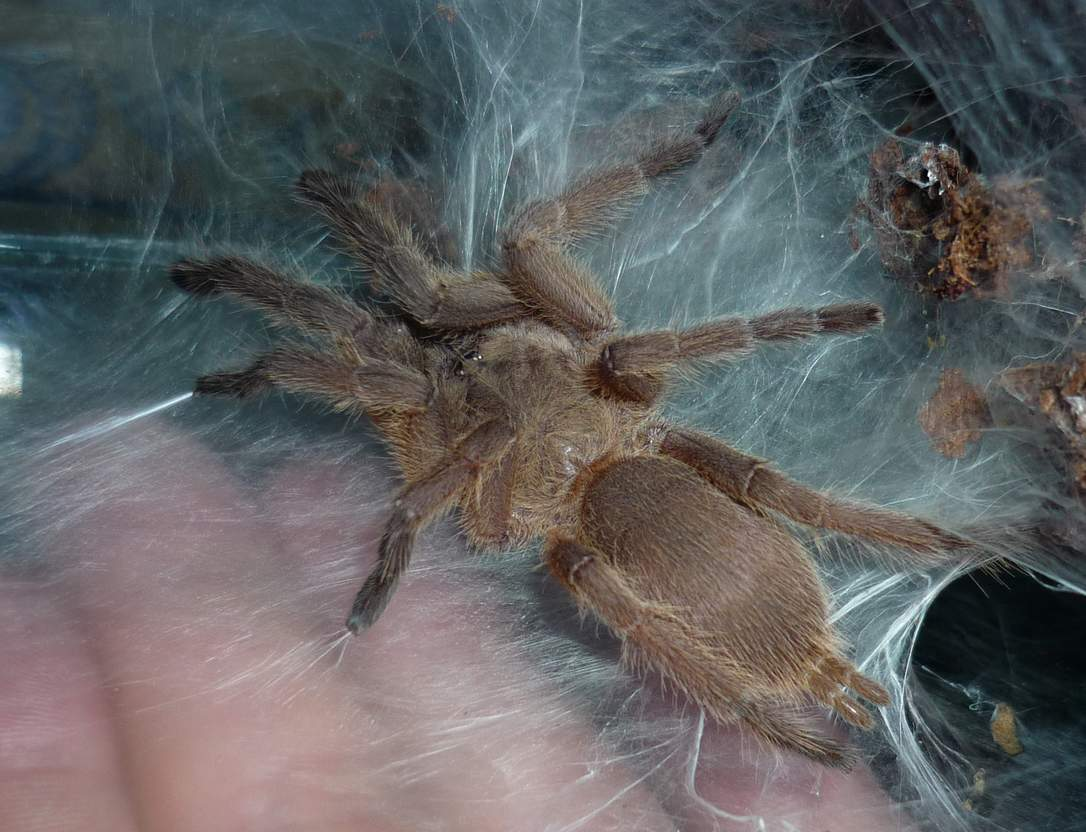
Chilobrachys huahini

Chilobrachys Karsch, 1892

- Chilobrachys andersoni (Pocock, 1895) - India, Myanmar, Malaysia
- Chilobrachys annandalei Simon, 1901 - Malaysia
- Chilobrachys assamensis Hirst, 1909 - India
- Chilobrachys bicolor (Pocock, 1895) - Myanmar
- Chilobrachys brevipes (Thorell, 1897) - Myanmar
- Chilobrachys dominus Lin & Li, 2022 - China
- Chilobrachys dyscolus (Simon, 1886) - Vietnam
- Chilobrachys femoralis Pocock, 1900 - India
- Chilobrachys fimbriatus Pocock, 1899 - India
- Chilobrachys flavopilosus (Simon, 1884) - India, Myanmar
- Chilobrachys fumosus (Pocock, 1895) - India
- Chilobrachys guangxiensis (Yin & Tan, 2000) - China
- Chilobrachys hardwickei (Pocock, 1895) - India
- Chilobrachys himalayensis (Tikader, 1977) - India
- Chilobrachys huahini Schmidt & Huber, 1996 - Thailand
- Chilobrachys hubei Song & Zhao, 1988 - China
- Chilobrachys jinchengi Lin & Li, 2022 - China
- Chilobrachys jonitriantisvansickleae Nanayakkara, Sumanapala & Kirk, 2019 - Sri Lanka
- Chilobrachys khasiensis (Tikader, 1977) - India
- Chilobrachys liboensis Zhu & Zhang, 2008 - China
- Chilobrachys lubricus Yu, S. Y. Zhang, F. Zhang, Li & Yang, 2021 - China
- Chilobrachys natanicharum Chomphuphuang, Sippawat, Sriranan, Piyatrakulchai, & Songsangchote, 2023 - Thailand
- Chilobrachys nitelinus Karsch, 1892 (type) - Sri Lanka
- Chilobrachys oculatus (Thorell, 1895) - Myanmar
- Chilobrachys paviei (Simon, 1886) - Thailand
- Chilobrachys pococki (Thorell, 1897) - Myanmar
- Chilobrachys sericeus (Thorell, 1895) - Myanmar
- Chilobrachys soricinus (Thorell, 1887) - Myanmar
- Chilobrachys stridulans (Wood Mason, 1877) - India
- Chilobrachys subarmatus (Thorell, 1891) - India (Nicobar Is.)
- Chilobrachys thorelli Pocock, 1900 - India

=== Chromatopelma ===
Chromatopelma

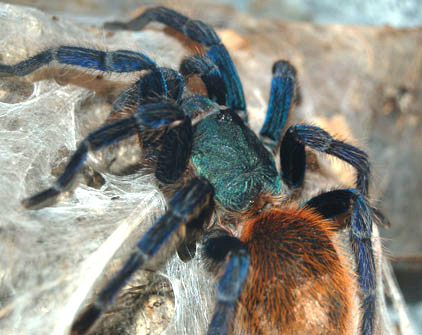
Greenbottle blue tarantula
(Chromatopelma cyaneopubescens)

Chromatopelma Schmidt, 1995

- Chromatopelma cyaneopubescens (Strand, 1907) (type) - Venezuela

=== Citharacanthus ===
Citharacanthus Pocock, 1901

- Citharacanthus alayoni Rudloff, 1995 - Cuba
- Citharacanthus cyaneus (Rudloff, 1994) - Cuba
- Citharacanthus livingstoni Schmidt & Weinmann, 1996 - Guatemala
- Citharacanthus longipes (F. O. Pickard-Cambridge, 1897) (type) - Mexico, Central America
- Citharacanthus meermani Reichling & West, 2000 - Belize, Mexico
- Citharacanthus niger Franganillo, 1931 - Cuba
- Citharacanthus sargi (Strand, 1907) - Guatemala
- Citharacanthus spinicrus (Latreille, 1819) - Cuba, Hispaniola

=== Citharognathus ===
Citharognathus Pocock, 1895

- Citharognathus hosei Pocock, 1895 (type) - Borneo
- Citharognathus tongmianensis Zhu, Li & Song, 2002 - China

=== Clavopelma ===
Clavopelma Chamberlin, 1940

- Clavopelma tamaulipeca (Chamberlin, 1937) (type) - Mexico

=== Coremiocnemis ===
Coremiocnemis Simon, 1892

- Coremiocnemis cunicularia (Simon, 1892) (type) - Malaysia
- Coremiocnemis hoggi West & Nunn, 2010 - Malaysia
- Coremiocnemis kotacana West & Nunn, 2010 - Indonesia (Sumatra)
- Coremiocnemis obscura West & Nunn, 2010 - Malaysia
- Coremiocnemis tropix Raven, 2005 - Australia (Queensland)
- Coremiocnemis valida Pocock, 1895 - Borneo

=== Cotztetlana ===
Cotztetlana Mendoza, 2012

- Cotztetlana omiltemi Mendoza, 2012 (type) - Mexico
- Cotztetlana villadai Estrada-Alvarez, 2014 - Mexico

=== Crassicrus ===
Crassicrus Reichling & West, 1996

- Crassicrus bidxigui Candia-Ramírez & Francke, 2017 - Mexico
- Crassicrus cocona Candia-Ramírez & Francke, 2017 - Mexico
- Crassicrus lamanai Reichling & West, 1996 (type) - Belize
- Crassicrus stoicum (Chamberlin, 1925) - Mexico
- Crassicrus tochtli Candia-Ramírez & Francke, 2017 - Mexico
- Crassicrus yumkimil Candia-Ramírez & Francke, 2017 - Mexico

=== Cubanana ===
Cubanana Ortiz, 2008

- Cubanana cristinae Ortiz, 2008 (type) - Cuba

=== Cyclosternum ===
Cyclosternum Ausserer, 1871

- Cyclosternum darienense Gabriel & Sherwood, 2022 - Panama
- Cyclosternum familiare (Simon, 1889) - Venezuela
- Cyclosternum garbei (Mello-Leitão, 1923) - Brazil
- Cyclosternum gaujoni Simon, 1889 - Ecuador
- Cyclosternum janthinum (Simon, 1889) - Ecuador
- Cyclosternum kochi (Ausserer, 1871) - Venezuela
- Cyclosternum ledezmae (Vol, 2001) - Bolivia
- Cyclosternum palomeranum West, 2000 - Mexico
- Cyclosternum rufohirtum (Simon, 1889) - Venezuela
- Cyclosternum schmardae Ausserer, 1871 (type) - Colombia, Ecuador
- Cyclosternum spinopalpus (Schaefer, 1996) - Paraguay
- Cyclosternum viridimonte Valerio, 1982 - Costa Rica

=== Cymbiapophysa ===
Cymbiapophysa Gabriel & Sherwood, 2020

- Cymbiapophysa magna Sherwood, Gabriel, Brescovit & Lucas, 2021 - Colombia
- Cymbiapophysa marimbai (Perafán & Valencia-Cuéllar, 2018) - Colombia
- Cymbiapophysa velox (Pocock, 1903) - Ecuador
- Cymbiapophysa yimana Gabriel & Sherwood, 2020 - Peru or Ecuador

=== Cyriocosmus ===
Cyriocosmus

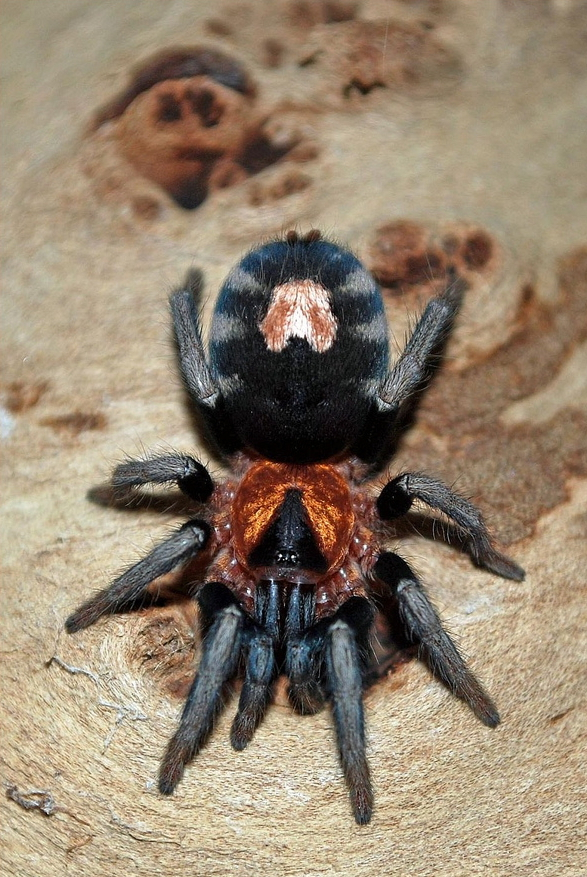
Cyriocosmus elegans

Cyriocosmus Simon, 1903

- Cyriocosmus aueri Kaderka, 2016 - Peru
- Cyriocosmus bertae Pérez-Miles, 1998 - Brazil
- Cyriocosmus bicolor (Schiapelli & Gerschman, 1945) - Brazil
- Cyriocosmus blenginii Pérez-Miles, 1998 - Bolivia
- Cyriocosmus elegans (Simon, 1889) - Venezuela, Trinidad and Tobago
- Cyriocosmus fasciatus (Mello-Leitão, 1930) - Brazil
- Cyriocosmus fernandoi Fukushima, Bertani & da Silva, 2005 - Brazil
- Cyriocosmus foliatus Kaderka, 2019 - Peru
- Cyriocosmus giganteus Kaderka, 2016 - Peru
- Cyriocosmus hoeferi Kaderka, 2016 - Brazil
- Cyriocosmus itayensis Kaderka, 2016 - Peru
- Cyriocosmus leetzi Vol, 1999 - Colombia, Venezuela
- Cyriocosmus nicholausgordoni Kaderka, 2016 - Venezuela
- Cyriocosmus nogueiranetoi Fukushima, Bertani & da Silva, 2005 - Brazil
- Cyriocosmus paredesi Kaderka, 2019 - Peru
- Cyriocosmus perezmilesi Kaderka, 2007 - Bolivia
- Cyriocosmus peruvianus Kaderka, 2016 - Peru
- Cyriocosmus pribiki Pérez-Miles & Weinmann, 2009 - Peru
- Cyriocosmus ritae Pérez-Miles, 1998 - Peru, Brazil
- Cyriocosmus sellatus (Simon, 1889) (type) - Peru, Brazil
- Cyriocosmus venezuelensis Kaderka, 2010 - Venezuela
- Cyriocosmus versicolor (Simon, 1897) - Paraguay, Argentina
- Cyriocosmus williamlamari Kaderka, 2016 - Venezuela

=== Cyriopagopus ===
Cyriopagopus

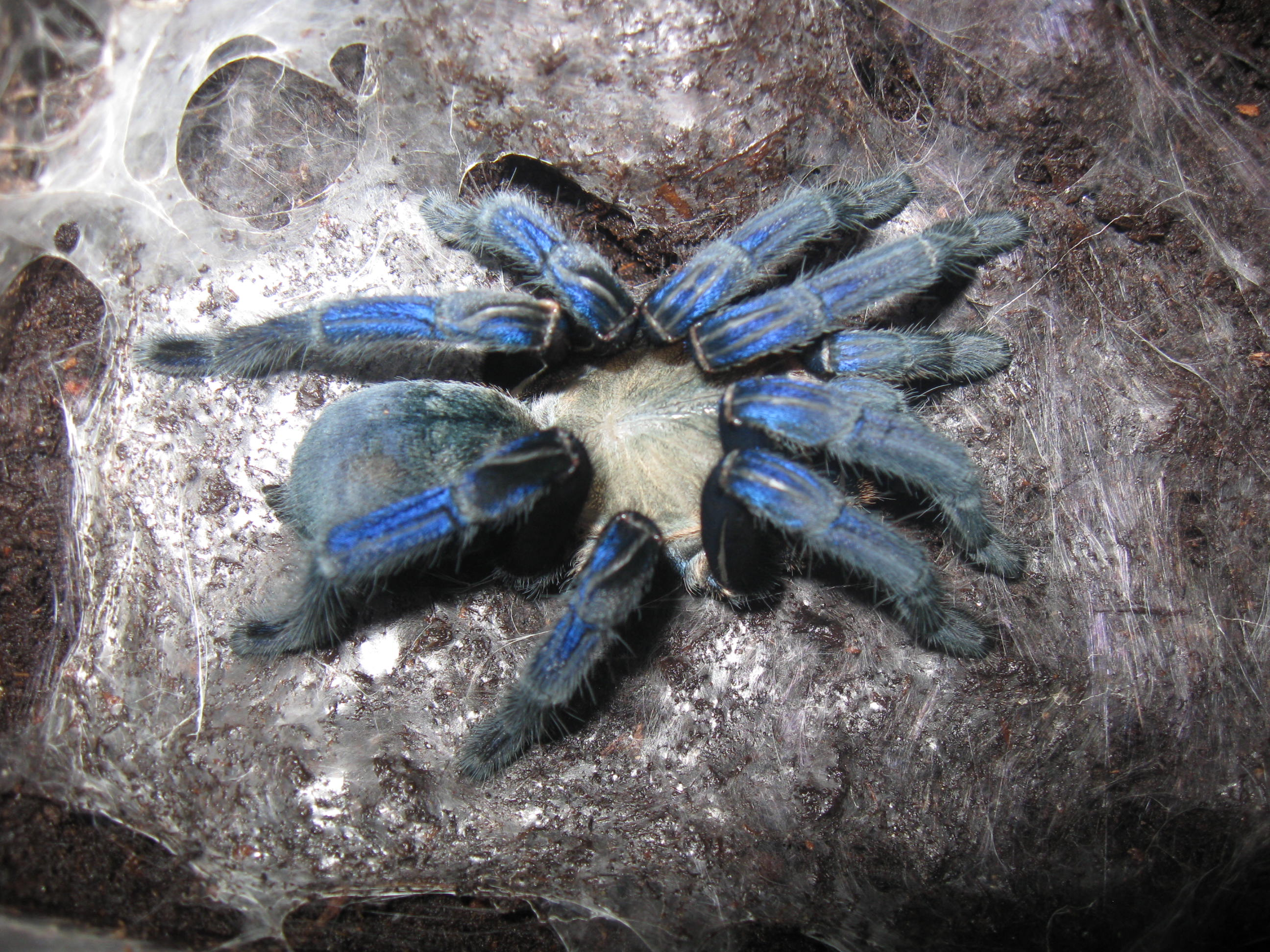
Cobalt blue tarantula
(Cyriopagopus lividus)

Cyriopagopus Simon, 1887

- Cyriopagopus albostriatus (Simon, 1886) - Myanmar, Thailand, Cambodia
- Cyriopagopus doriae (Thorell, 1890) - Malaysia (Borneo)
- Cyriopagopus hainanus (Liang, Peng, Huang & Chen, 1999) - China
- Cyriopagopus lividus (Smith, 1996) - Myanmar, Thailand
- Cyriopagopus longipes (von Wirth & Striffler, 2005) - Thailand, Cambodia, Laos
- Cyriopagopus minax (Thorell, 1897) - Myanmar, Thailand
- Cyriopagopus paganus Simon, 1887 (type) - Myanmar
- Cyriopagopus schmidti (von Wirth, 1991) - China, Vietnam
- Cyriopagopus vonwirthi (Schmidt, 2005) - Southeast Asia

=== Cyrtogrammomma ===
Cyrtogrammomma Pocock, 1895

- Cyrtogrammomma frevo Gonzalez-Filho, Fonseca-Ferreira, Brescovit & Guadanucci, 2022 - Brazil
- Cyrtogrammomma monticola Pocock, 1895 - Guyana, Brazil
- Cyrtogrammomma raveni Mori & Bertani, 2020 - Guyana

=== Cyrtopholis ===
Cyrtopholis Simon, 1892

- Cyrtopholis agilis Pocock, 1903 - Hispaniola
- Cyrtopholis anacanta Franganillo, 1935 - Cuba
- Cyrtopholis annectans Chamberlin, 1917 - Barbados
- Cyrtopholis bartholomaei (Latreille, 1832) - St. Thomas, Antigua
- Cyrtopholis bonhotei (F. O. Pickard-Cambridge, 1901) - Bahama Is.
- Cyrtopholis bryantae Rudloff, 1995 - Cuba
- Cyrtopholis culebrae (Petrunkevitch, 1929) - Puerto Rico
- Cyrtopholis cursor (Ausserer, 1875) (type) - Hispaniola
- Cyrtopholis femoralis Pocock, 1903 - Montserrat
- Cyrtopholis flavostriata Schmidt, 1995 - Virgin Is.
- Cyrtopholis gibbosa Franganillo, 1936 - Cuba
- Cyrtopholis innocua (Ausserer, 1871) - Cuba
- Cyrtopholis intermedia (Ausserer, 1875) - South America
- Cyrtopholis ischnoculiformis (Franganillo, 1926) - Cuba
- Cyrtopholis jamaicola Strand, 1908 - Jamaica
- Cyrtopholis major (Franganillo, 1926) - Cuba
- Cyrtopholis obsoleta (Franganillo, 1935) - Cuba
- Cyrtopholis plumosa Franganillo, 1931 - Cuba
- Cyrtopholis portoricae Chamberlin, 1917 - Puerto Rico
- Cyrtopholis ramsi Rudloff, 1995 - Cuba
- Cyrtopholis regibbosa Rudloff, 1994 - Cuba
- Cyrtopholis unispina Franganillo, 1926 - Cuba

== D ==
=== Davus ===
Davus

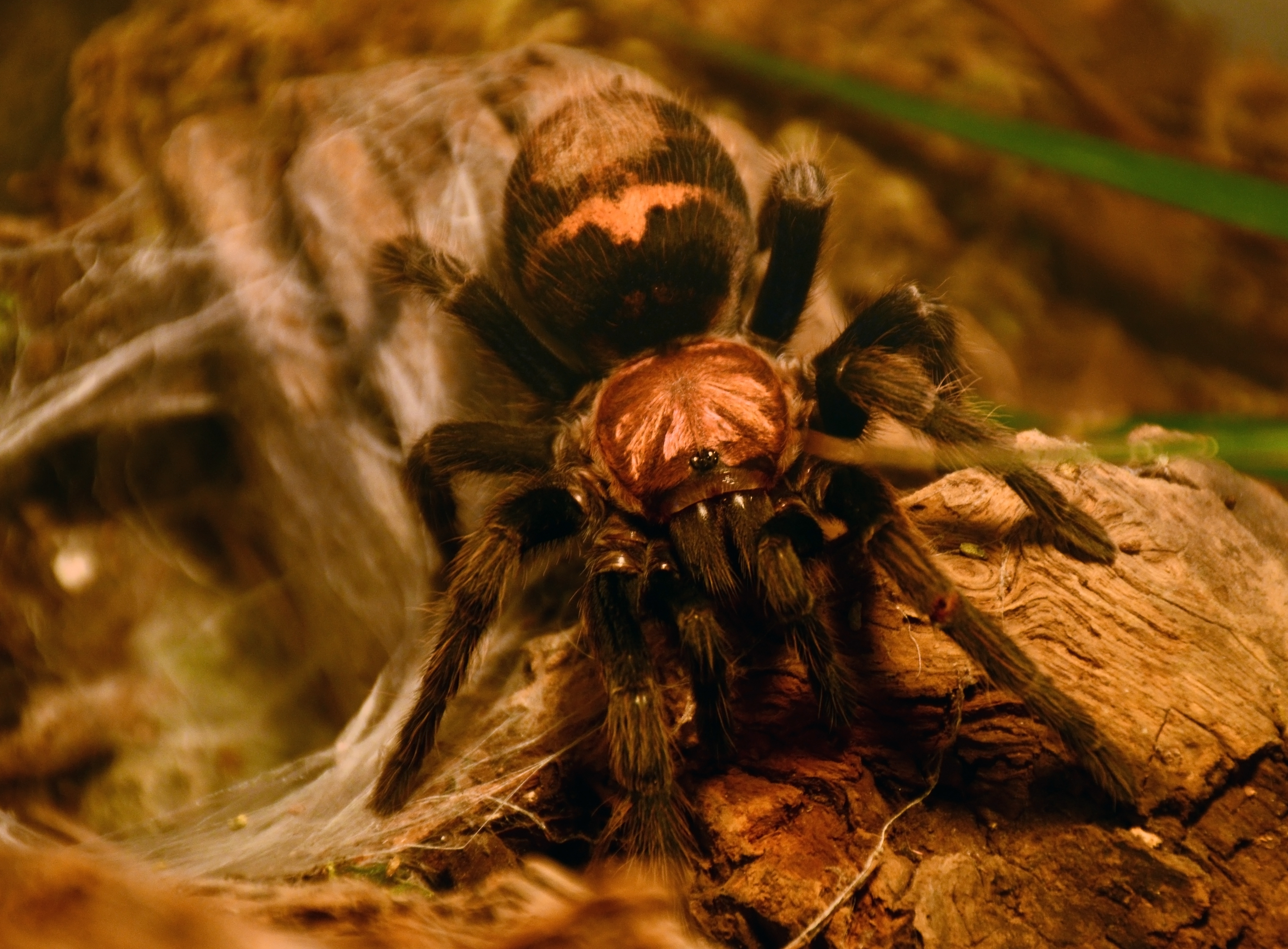
Costa Rican tiger rump
(Davus fasciatus)

Davus O. Pickard-Cambridge, 1892

- Davus fasciatus O. Pickard-Cambridge, 1892 (type) - Costa Rica, Panama
- Davus pentaloris (Simon, 1888) - Mexico, Guatemala
- Davus ruficeps (Simon, 1891) - Costa Rica, Nicaragua
- Davus santos Gabriel, 2016 - Panama

=== Dolichothele ===
Dolichothele

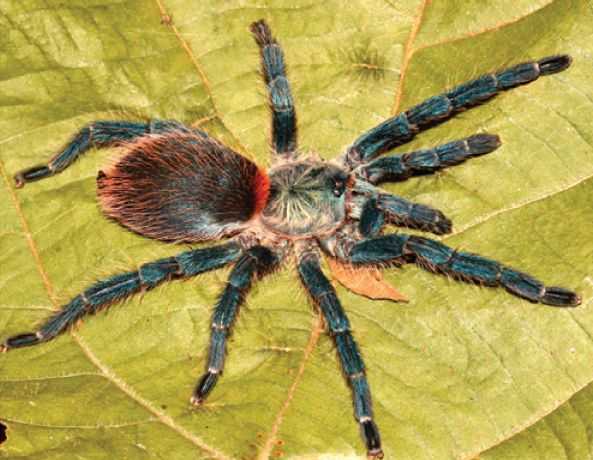
Dolichothele diamantinensis, female

Dolichothele Mello-Leitão, 1923

- Dolichothele auratum (Vellard, 1924) - Brazil
- Dolichothele bolivianum (Vol, 2001) - Bolivia, Brazil
- Dolichothele camargorum Revollo, da Silva & Bertani, 2017 - Bolivia, Brazil
- Dolichothele diamantinensis (Bertani, Santos & Righi, 2009) - Brazil
- Dolichothele dominguense (Guadanucci, 2007) - Brazil
- Dolichothele exilis Mello-Leitão, 1923 (type) - Brazil
- Dolichothele mineirum (Guadanucci, 2011) - Brazil
- Dolichothele mottai Revollo, da Silva & Bertani, 2017 - Brazil
- Dolichothele rufoniger (Guadanucci, 2007) - Brazil
- Dolichothele tucuruiense (Guadanucci, 2007) - Brazil

== E ==
=== Encyocratella ===
Encyocratella Strand, 1907

- Encyocratella olivacea Strand, 1907 (type) - Tanzania

=== Encyocrates ===
Encyocrates Simon, 1892

- Encyocrates raffrayi Simon, 1892 (type) - Madagascar

=== Ephebopus ===
Ephebopus

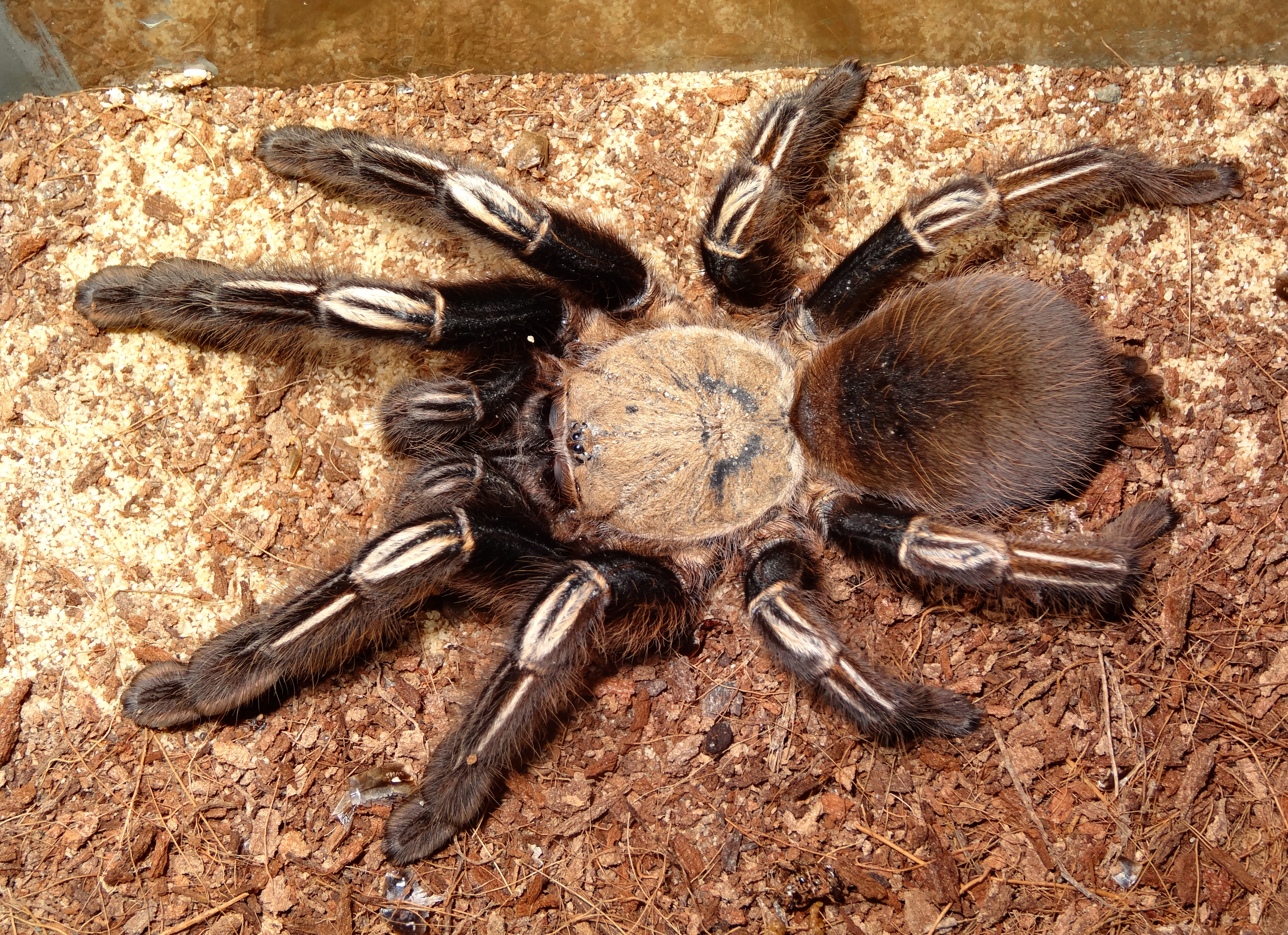
Skeleton tarantula
(Ephebopus murinus)

Ephebopus Simon, 1892

- Ephebopus cyanognathus West & Marshall, 2000 - French Guiana
- Ephebopus foliatus West, Marshall, Fukushima & Bertani, 2008 - Guyana
- Ephebopus murinus (Walckenaer, 1837) (type) - French Guiana, Suriname, Brazil
- Ephebopus rufescens West & Marshall, 2000 - French Guiana, Brazil
- Ephebopus uatuman Lucas, Silva & Bertani, 1992 - Brazil

=== Euathlus ===
Euathlus

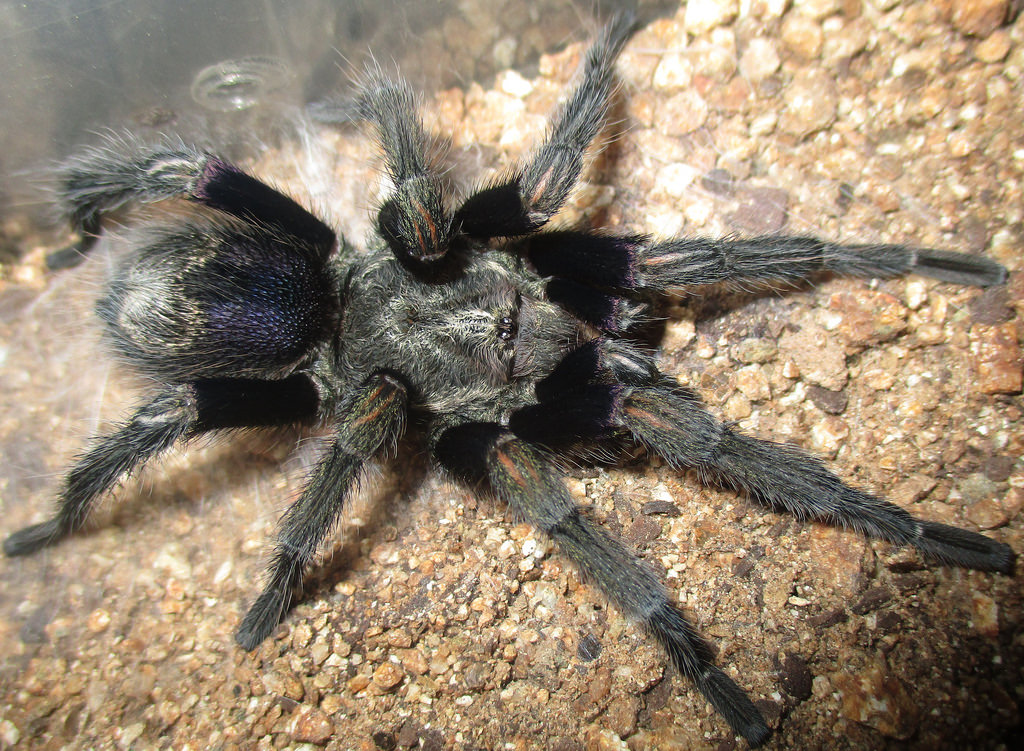
Euathlus truculentus

Euathlus Ausserer, 1875

- Euathlus affinis (Nicolet, 1849) - Chile
- Euathlus antai Perafán & Pérez-Miles, 2014 - Chile
- Euathlus atacama Perafán & Pérez-Miles, 2014 - Chile
- Euathlus condorito Perafán & Pérez-Miles, 2014 - Chile
- Euathlus diamante Ferretti, 2015 - Argentina
- Euathlus grismadoi Ríos-Tamayo, 2020 - Argentina
- Euathlus manicata (Simon, 1892) - Chile
- Euathlus mauryi Ríos-Tamayo, 2020 - Argentina
- Euathlus pampa Ríos-Tamayo, 2020 - Argentina
- Euathlus parvulus (Pocock, 1903) - Chile
- Euathlus sagei Ferretti, 2015 - Argentina
- Euathlus tenebrarum Ferretti, 2015 - Argentina
- Euathlus truculentus L. Koch, 1875 (type) - Chile, Argentina
- Euathlus vanessae Quispe-Colca & Ferretti, 2021 - Peru

=== Eucratoscelus ===
Eucratoscelus Pocock, 1898

- Eucratoscelus constrictus (Gerstäcker, 1873) (type) - Kenya, Tanzania
- Eucratoscelus pachypus Schmidt & von Wirth, 1990 - Tanzania

=== Eumenophorus ===
Eumenophorus Pocock, 1897

- Eumenophorus clementsi Pocock, 1897 (type) - Sierra Leone
- Eumenophorus murphyorum Smith, 1990 - Sierra Leone

=== Eupalaestrus ===
Eupalaestrus

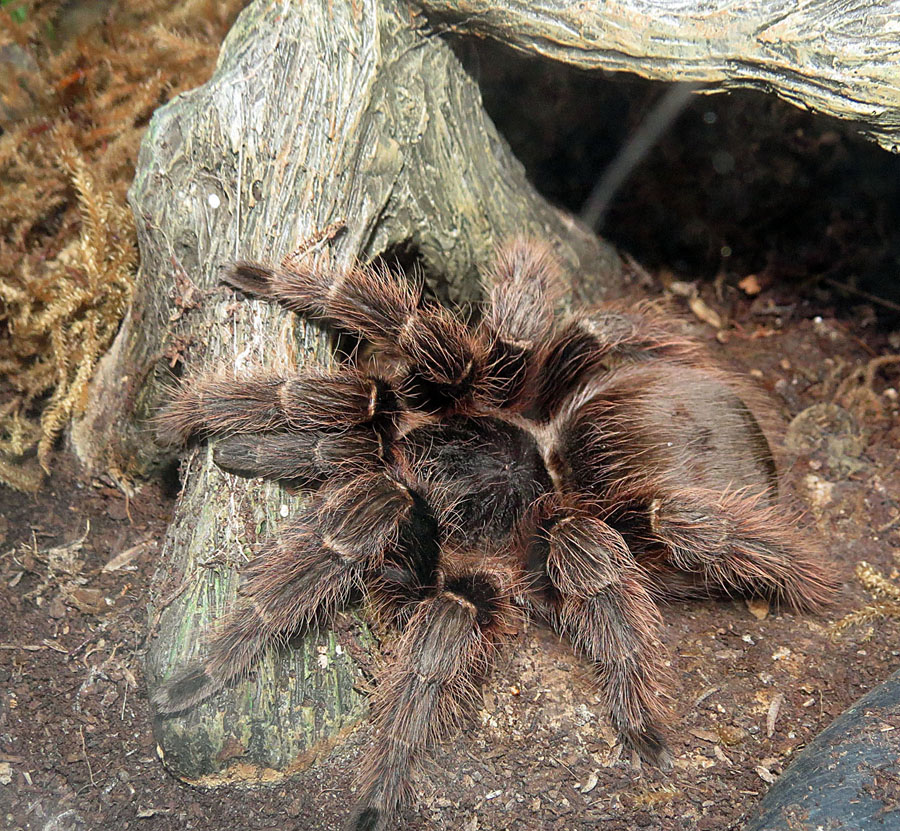
Pink zebra beauty
(Eupalaestrus campestratus)

Eupalaestrus Pocock, 1901

- Eupalaestrus campestratus (Simon, 1891) (type) - Brazil, Paraguay, Argentina
- Eupalaestrus crassimetatarsis Borges, Paladini & Bertani, 2021 - Brazil, Argentina
- Eupalaestrus larae Ferretti & Barneche, 2012 - Argentina
- Eupalaestrus roccoi Borges, Paladini & Bertani, 2021 - Brazil
- Eupalaestrus spinosissimus Mello-Leitão, 1923 - Brazil
- Eupalaestrus weijenberghi (Thorell, 1894) - Brazil, Uruguay, Argentina

=== Euphrictus ===
Euphrictus Hirst, 1908

- Euphrictus spinosus Hirst, 1908 (type) - Cameroon
- Euphrictus squamosus (Benoit, 1965) - Congo

=== Euthycaelus ===
Euthycaelus Simon, 1889

- Euthycaelus amandae Guadanucci & Weinmann, 2014 - Colombia
- Euthycaelus astutus (Simon, 1889) - Venezuela
- Euthycaelus colonica Simon, 1889 (type) - Venezuela
- Euthycaelus guane Valencia-Cuellar, Perafán & Guadanucci, 2019 - Colombia
- Euthycaelus norae Guadanucci & Weinmann, 2014 - Colombia, Venezuela
- Euthycaelus quinteroi Gabriel & Sherwood, 2022 - Panama

== G ==
=== Grammostola ===
Grammostola

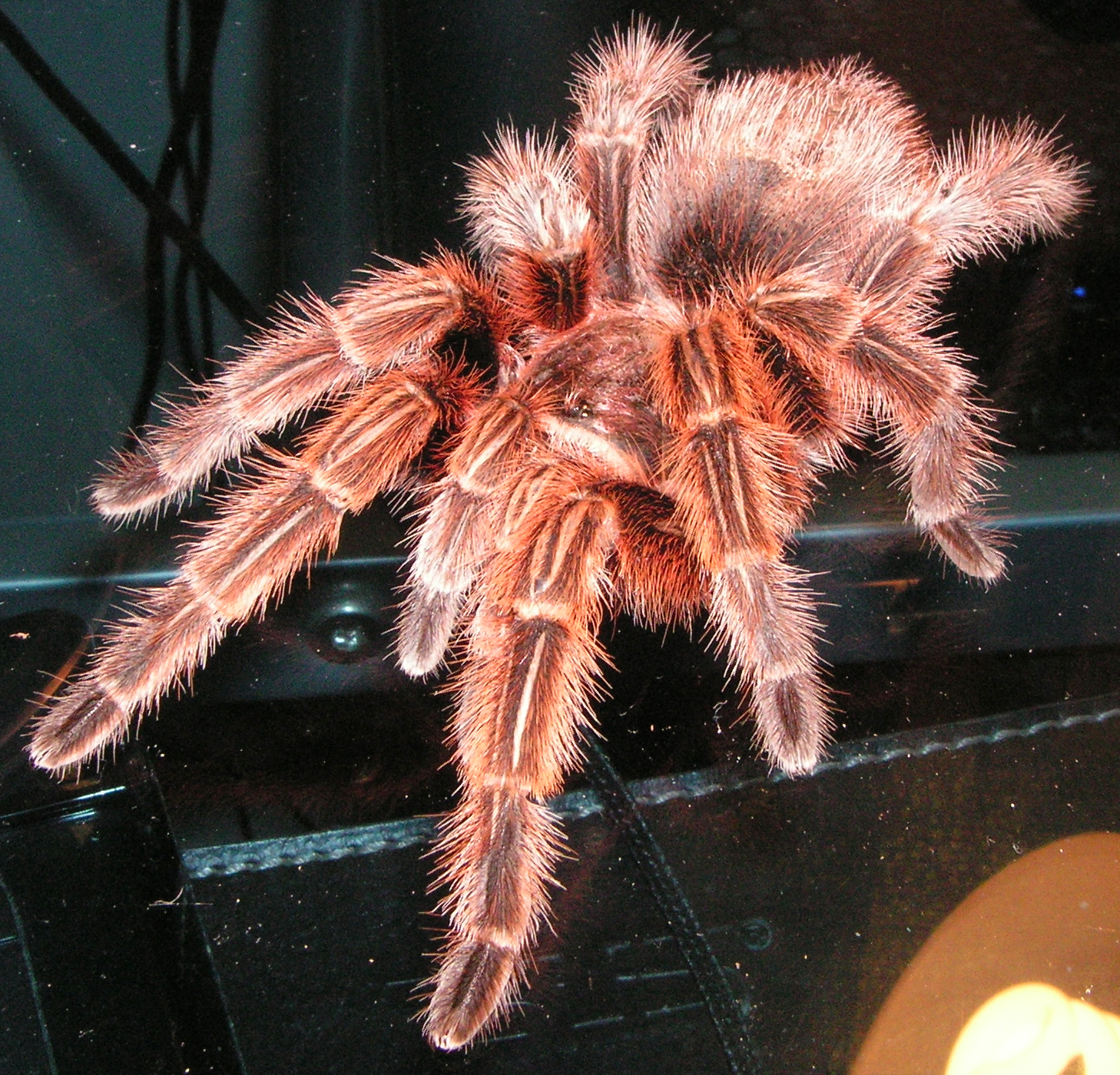
Chilean rose tarantula
(Grammostola rosea)

Grammostola Simon, 1892

- Grammostola actaeon (Pocock, 1903) - Brazil, Uruguay
- Grammostola alticeps (Pocock, 1903) - Uruguay
- Grammostola andreleetzi Vol, 2008 - Uruguay
- Grammostola anthracina (C. L. Koch, 1842) - Brazil, Uruguay, Paraguay, Argentina
- Grammostola borelli (Simon, 1897) - Paraguay
- Grammostola burzaquensis Ibarra, 1946 - Argentina
- Grammostola chalcothrix Chamberlin, 1917 - Argentina
- Grammostola diminuta Ferretti, Pompozzi, González & Pérez-Miles, 2013 - Argentina
- Grammostola doeringi (Holmberg, 1881) - Argentina
- Grammostola gossei (Pocock, 1899) - Argentina
- Grammostola grossa (Ausserer, 1871) - Brazil, Paraguay, Uruguay, Argentina
- Grammostola iheringi (Keyserling, 1891) - Brazil
- Grammostola inermis Mello-Leitão, 1941 - Argentina
- Grammostola mendozae (Strand, 1907) - Argentina
- Grammostola pulchra Mello-Leitão, 1921 - Brazil
- Grammostola pulchripes (Simon, 1891) (type) - Paraguay, Argentina
- Grammostola quirogai Montes de Oca, D'Elía & Pérez-Miles, 2016 - Brazil, Uruguay
- Grammostola rosea (Walckenaer, 1837) - Bolivia, Chile, Argentina
- Grammostola subvulpina (Strand, 1906) - South America
- Grammostola vachoni Schiapelli & Gerschman, 1961 - Argentina

=== Guyruita ===
Guyruita Guadanucci, Lucas, Indicatti & Yamamoto, 2007

- Guyruita atlantica Guadanucci, Lucas, Indicatti & Yamamoto, 2007 - Brazil
- Guyruita cerrado Guadanucci, Lucas, Indicatti & Yamamoto, 2007 (type) - Brazil
- Guyruita giupponii Fukushima & Bertani, 2018 - Brazil
- Guyruita guadanuccii Sherwood & Gabriel, 2021 -French Guiana
- Guyruita isae Fukushima & Bertani, 2018 - Brazil
- Guyruita metallophila Fonseca-Ferreira, Zampaulo & Guadanucci, 2017 - Brazil

== H ==
=== Hapalopus ===
Hapalopus

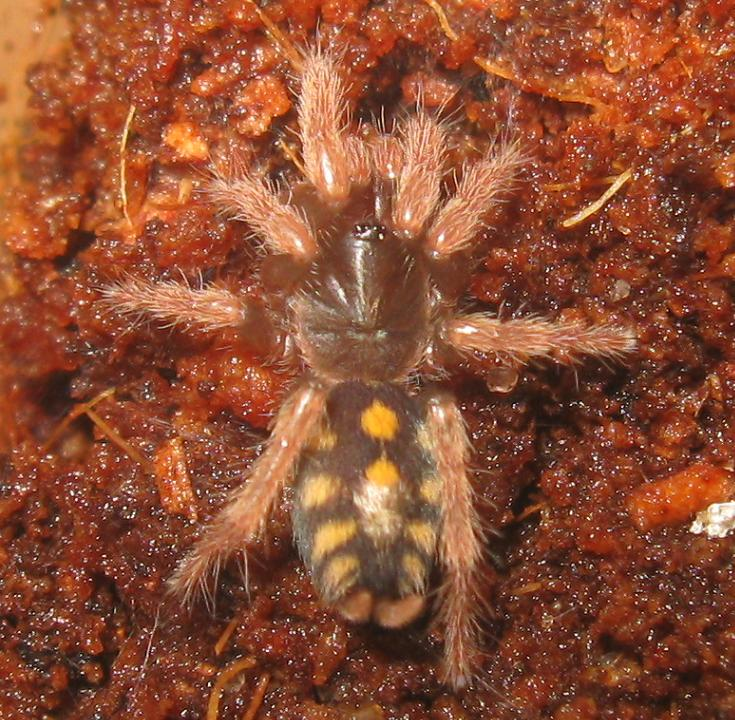
Hapalopus triseriatus, juvenile

Hapalopus Ausserer, 1875

- Hapalopus aymara Perdomo, Panzera & Pérez-Miles, 2009 - Bolivia, Brazil
- Hapalopus butantan (Pérez-Miles, 1998) - Brazil
- Hapalopus coloratus (Valerio, 1982) - Panama
- Hapalopus formosus Ausserer, 1875 (type) - Colombia
- Hapalopus gasci (Maréchal, 1996) - French Guiana
- Hapalopus lesleyae Gabriel, 2011 - Guyana
- Hapalopus nigriventris (Mello-Leitão, 1939) - Venezuela
- Hapalopus serrapelada Fonseca-Ferreira, Zampaulo & Guadanucci, 2017 - Brazil
- Hapalopus triseriatus Caporiacco, 1955 - Venezuela
- Hapalopus variegatus (Caporiacco, 1955) - Venezuela

=== Hapalotremus ===
Hapalotremus Simon, 1903

- Hapalotremus albipes Simon, 1903 (type) - Bolivia
- Hapalotremus apasanka Sherwood, Ferretti, Gabriel & West, 2021 - Peru
- Hapalotremus carabaya Ferretti, Cavalllo, Chaparro, Ríos-Tamayo, Seimon & West, 2018 - Peru
- Hapalotremus chasqui Ferretti, Cavalllo, Chaparro, Ríos-Tamayo, Seimon & West, 2018 - Argentina
- Hapalotremus chespiritoi Ferretti, Cavalllo, Chaparro, Ríos-Tamayo, Seimon & West, 2018 - Peru
- Hapalotremus hananqheswa Sherwood, Ferretti, Gabriel & West, 2021 - Peru
- Hapalotremus kaderkai Sherwood, Ferretti, Gabriel & West, 2021 - Peru
- Hapalotremus kuka Ferretti, Cavalllo, Chaparro, Ríos-Tamayo, Seimon & West, 2018 - Bolivia
- Hapalotremus major (Chamberlin, 1916) - Peru
- Hapalotremus marcapata Ferretti, Cavalllo, Chaparro, Ríos-Tamayo, Seimon & West, 2018 - Peru
- Hapalotremus martinorum Cavallo & Ferretti, 2015 - Argentina
- Hapalotremus perezmilesi Ferretti, Cavalllo, Chaparro, Ríos-Tamayo, Seimon & West, 2018 - Peru
- Hapalotremus vilcanota Ferretti, Cavalllo, Chaparro, Ríos-Tamayo, Seimon & West, 2018 - Peru
- Hapalotremus yuraqchanka Sherwood, Ferretti, Gabriel & West, 2021 - Bolivia

=== Haploclastus ===
Haploclastus

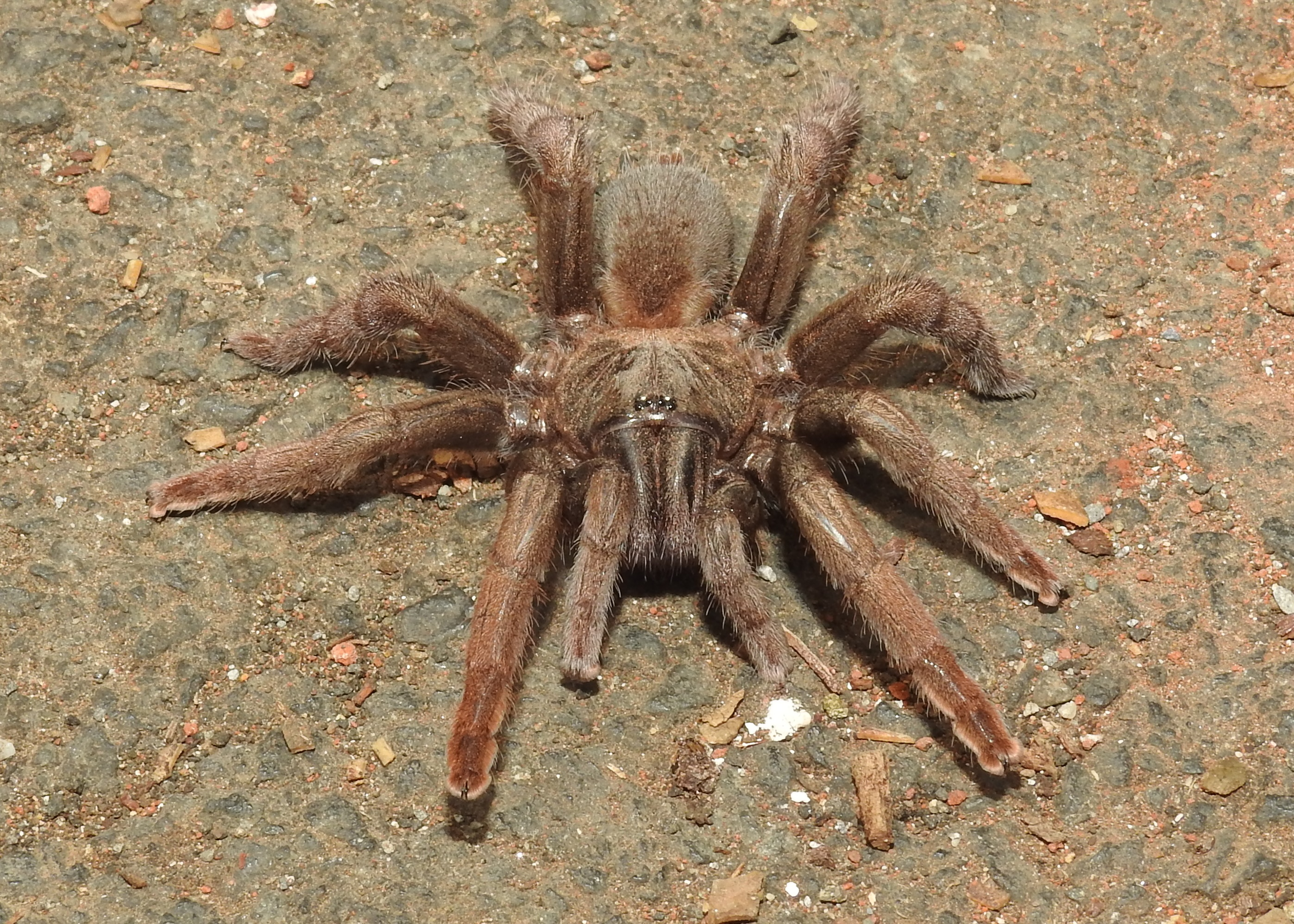
Haploclastus validus

Haploclastus Simon, 1892

- Haploclastus cervinus Simon, 1892 (type) - India
- Haploclastus devamatha Prasanth & Sunil Jose, 2014 - India
- Haploclastus kayi Gravely, 1915 - India
- Haploclastus nilgirinus Pocock, 1899 - India
- Haploclastus satyanus (Barman, 1978) - India
- Haploclastus tenebrosus Gravely, 1935 - India
- Haploclastus validus (Pocock, 1899) - India

=== Haplocosmia ===
Haplocosmia

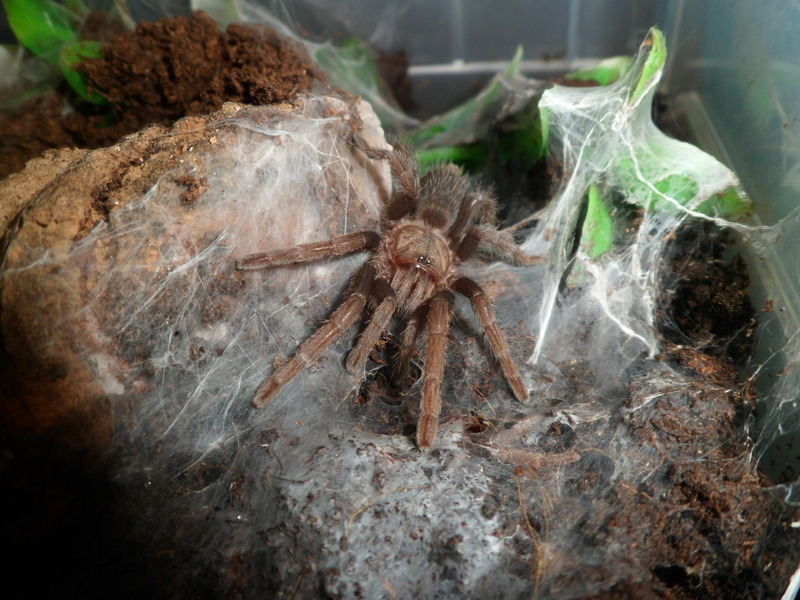
Haplocosmia nepalensis

Haplocosmia Schmidt & von Wirth, 1996

- Haplocosmia himalayana (Pocock, 1899) - Himalayas
- Haplocosmia nepalensis Schmidt & von Wirth, 1996 (type) - Nepal
- Haplocosmia sherwoodae Lin & Li, 2022 - China

=== Harpactira ===
Harpactira Ausserer, 1871

- Harpactira atra (Latreille, 1832) (type) - South Africa
- Harpactira baviana Purcell, 1903 - South Africa
- Harpactira cafreriana (Walckenaer, 1837) - South Africa
- Harpactira chrysogaster Pocock, 1897 - South Africa
- Harpactira curator Pocock, 1898 - South Africa
- Harpactira curvipes Pocock, 1897 - South Africa
- Harpactira dictator Purcell, 1902 - South Africa
- Harpactira gigas Pocock, 1898 - South Africa
- Harpactira hamiltoni Pocock, 1902 - South Africa
- Harpactira lineata Pocock, 1897 - South Africa
- Harpactira lyrata (Simon, 1892) - South Africa
- Harpactira marksi Purcell, 1902 - South Africa
- Harpactira namaquensis Purcell, 1902 - Namibia, South Africa
- Harpactira pulchripes Pocock, 1901 - South Africa
- Harpactira tigrina Ausserer, 1875 - South Africa

=== Harpactirella ===
Harpactirella Purcell, 1902

- Harpactirella domicola Purcell, 1903 - South Africa
- Harpactirella helenae Purcell, 1903 - South Africa
- Harpactirella insidiosa (Denis, 1960) - Morocco
- Harpactirella karrooica Purcell, 1902 - South Africa
- Harpactirella lapidaria Purcell, 1908 - South Africa
- Harpactirella lightfooti Purcell, 1902 - South Africa
- Harpactirella longipes Purcell, 1902 - South Africa
- Harpactirella magna Purcell, 1903 - South Africa
- Harpactirella overdijki Gallon, 2010 - South Africa
- Harpactirella schwarzi Purcell, 1904 - South Africa
- Harpactirella spinosa Purcell, 1908 - South Africa
- Harpactirella treleaveni Purcell, 1902 (type) - South Africa

=== Hemirrhagus ===
Hemirrhagus Simon, 1903

- Hemirrhagus akheronteus Mendoza & Francke, 2018 - Mexico
- Hemirrhagus benzaa Mendoza, 2014 - Mexico
- Hemirrhagus billsteelei Mendoza & Francke, 2018 - Mexico
- Hemirrhagus cervinus (Simon, 1891) (type) - Mexico
- Hemirrhagus chilango Pérez-Miles & Locht, 2003 - Mexico
- Hemirrhagus coztic Pérez-Miles & Locht, 2003 - Mexico
- Hemirrhagus diablo Mendoza & Francke, 2018 - Mexico
- Hemirrhagus elliotti (Gertsch, 1973) - Mexico
- Hemirrhagus embolulatus Mendoza, 2014 - Mexico
- Hemirrhagus eros Pérez-Miles & Locht, 2003 - Mexico
- Hemirrhagus franckei Mendoza, 2014 - Mexico
- Hemirrhagus gertschi Pérez-Miles & Locht, 2003 - Mexico
- Hemirrhagus grieta (Gertsch, 1982) - Mexico
- Hemirrhagus guichi Mendoza, 2014 - Mexico
- Hemirrhagus kalebi Mendoza & Francke, 2018 - Mexico
- Hemirrhagus lochti Estrada-Alvarez, 2014 - Mexico
- Hemirrhagus mitchelli (Gertsch, 1982) - Mexico
- Hemirrhagus nahuanus (Gertsch, 1982) - Mexico
- Hemirrhagus ocellatus Pérez-Miles & Locht, 2003 - Mexico
- Hemirrhagus papalotl Pérez-Miles & Locht, 2003 - Mexico
- Hemirrhagus perezmilesi García-Villafuerte & Locht, 2010 - Mexico
- Hemirrhagus pernix (Ausserer, 1875) - Mexico
- Hemirrhagus puebla (Gertsch, 1982) - Mexico
- Hemirrhagus reddelli (Gertsch, 1973) - Mexico
- Hemirrhagus sprousei Mendoza & Francke, 2018 - Mexico
- Hemirrhagus stygius (Gertsch, 1971) - Mexico
- Hemirrhagus valdezi Mendoza, 2014 - Mexico

=== Heterophrictus ===
Heterophrictus Pocock, 1900

- Heterophrictus aareyensis Mirza & Sanap, 2014 - India
- Heterophrictus blatteri (Gravely, 1935) - India
- Heterophrictus milleti Pocock, 1900 (type) - India
- Heterophrictus raveni Mirza & Sanap, 2014 - India

=== Heteroscodra ===
Heteroscodra

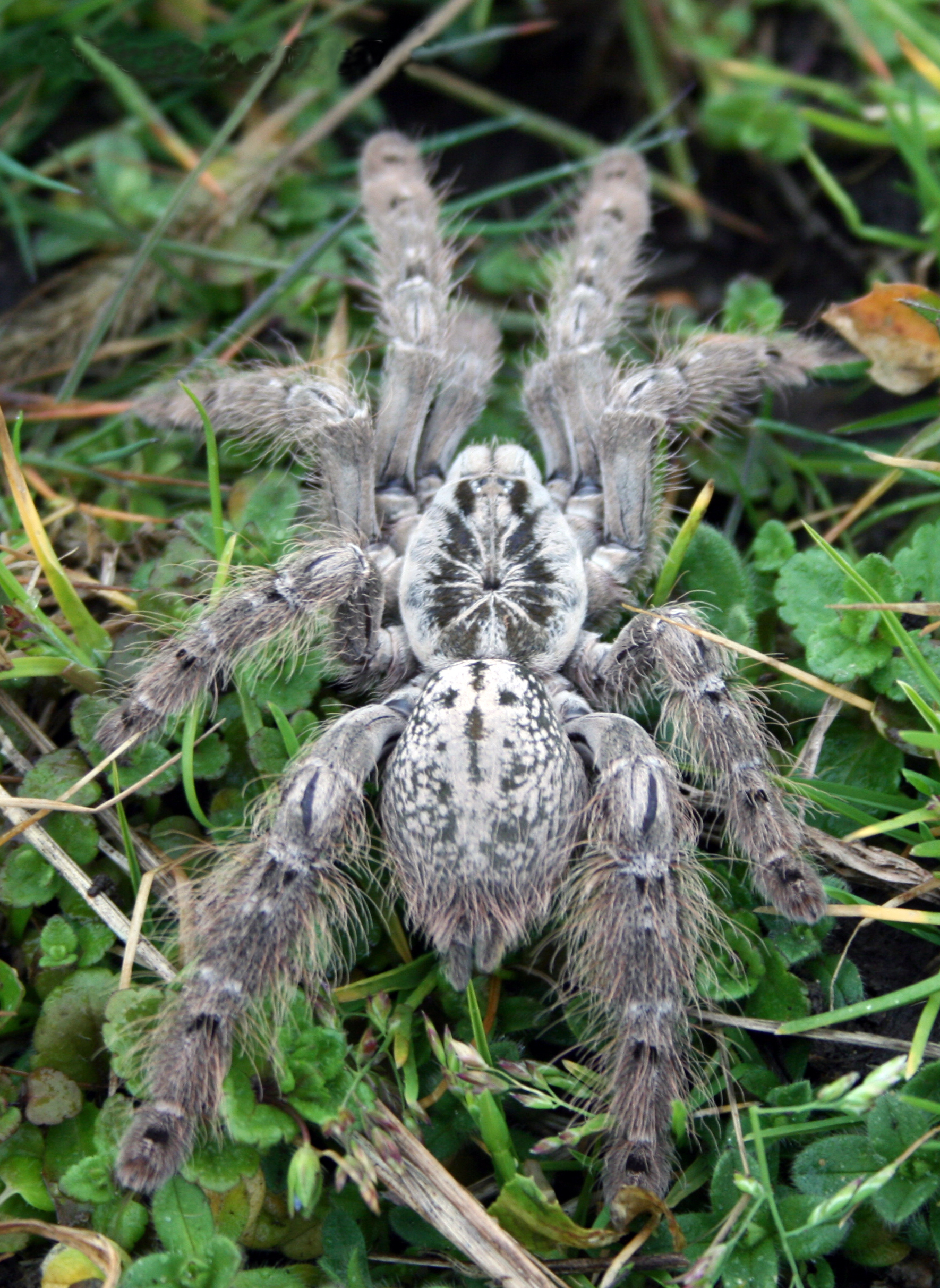
Togo starburst
(Heteroscodra maculata)

Heteroscodra Pocock, 1900

- Heteroscodra crassipes Hirst, 1907 - Cameroon, Gabon, Congo
- Heteroscodra maculata Pocock, 1900 (type) - West, Central Africa

=== Heterothele ===
Heterothele Karsch, 1879

- Heterothele affinis Laurent, 1946 - Congo, Tanzania
- Heterothele atropha Simon, 1907 - Congo
- Heterothele caudicula (Simon, 1886) - Argentina
- Heterothele darcheni (Benoit, 1966) - Gabon
- Heterothele decemnotata (Simon, 1891) - Congo
- Heterothele gabonensis (Lucas, 1858) - Gabon
- Heterothele honesta Karsch, 1879 (type) - Angola
- Heterothele hullwilliamsi Smith, 1990 - Cameroon
- Heterothele ogbunikia Smith, 1990 - Nigeria
- Heterothele spinipes Pocock, 1897 - Tanzania

=== Holothele ===
Holothele Karsch, 1879

- Holothele culebrae (Petrunkevitch, 1929) - Puerto Rico
- Holothele denticulata (Franganillo, 1930) - Cuba
- Holothele longipes (L. Koch, 1875) (type) - Venezuela, Bolivia, Trinidad and Tobago, French Guiana, Suriname, Brazil
- Holothele maddeni (Esposito & Agnarsson, 2014) - Dominican Republic
- Holothele shoemakeri (Petrunkevitch, 1926) - US Virgin Islands (St. Thomas)
- Holothele sulfurensis Maréchal, 2005 - Guadeloupe

=== Homoeomma ===
Homoeomma Ausserer, 1871

- Homoeomma brasilianum (Chamberlin, 1917) - Brazil
- Homoeomma chilensis Montenegro & Aguilera, 2018 - Chile
- Homoeomma elegans (Gerschman & Schiapelli, 1958) - Argentina
- Homoeomma familiare Bertkau, 1880 - Brazil
- Homoeomma hirsutum (Mello-Leitão, 1935) - Brazil
- Homoeomma montanum (Mello-Leitão, 1923) - Brazil
- Homoeomma nigrum (Walckenaer, 1837) - Brazil
- Homoeomma orellanai Montenegro & Aguilera, 2018 - Chile
- Homoeomma peruvianum (Chamberlin, 1916) - Peru
- Homoeomma strabo (Simon, 1892) - Colombia, Brazil
- Homoeomma stradlingi O. Pickard-Cambridge, 1881 (type) - Brazil
- Homoeomma uruguayense (Mello-Leitão, 1946) - Uruguay, Argentina
- Homoeomma villosum (Keyserling, 1891) - Brazil

=== Hysterocrates ===
Hysterocrates

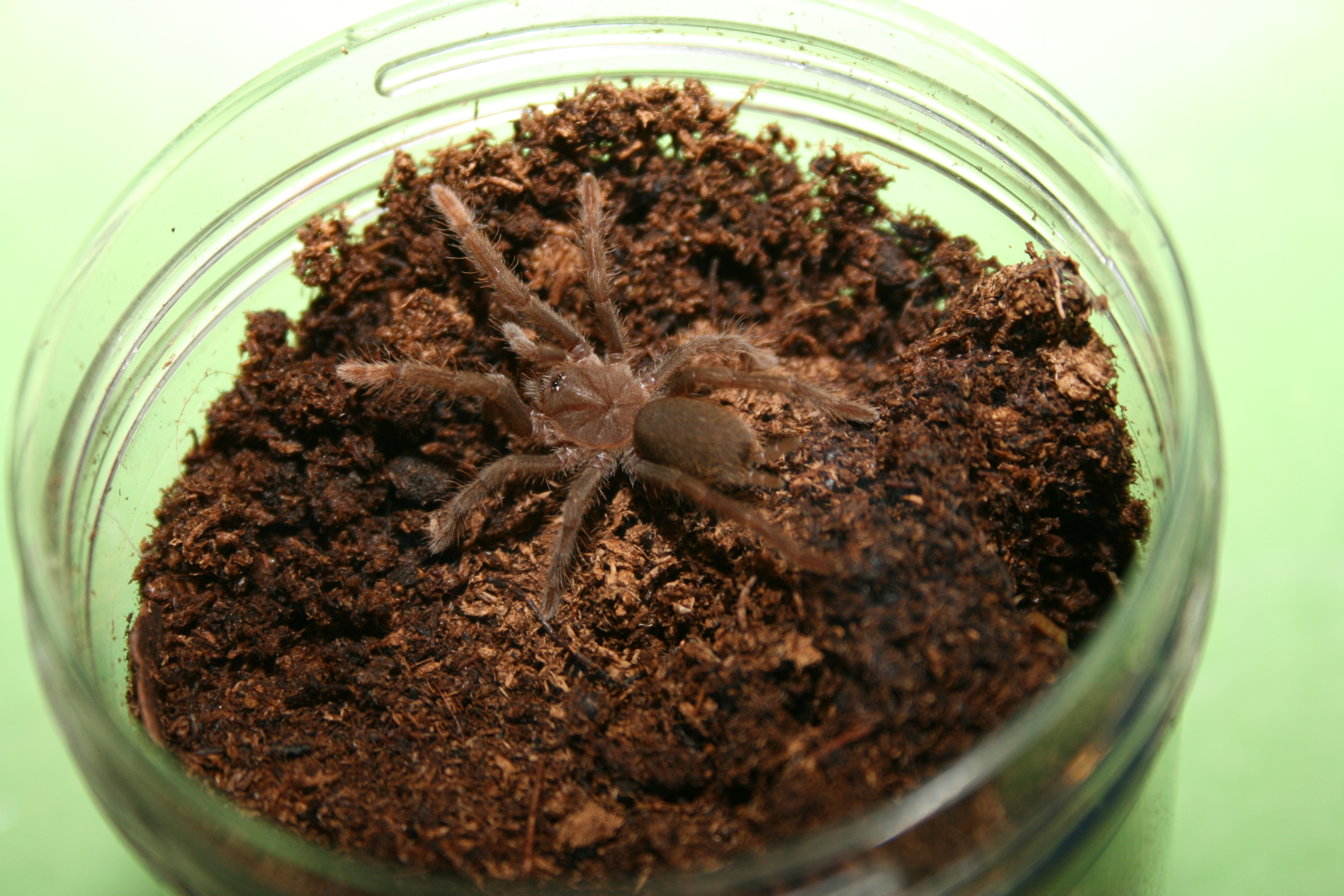
Hysterocrates ederi

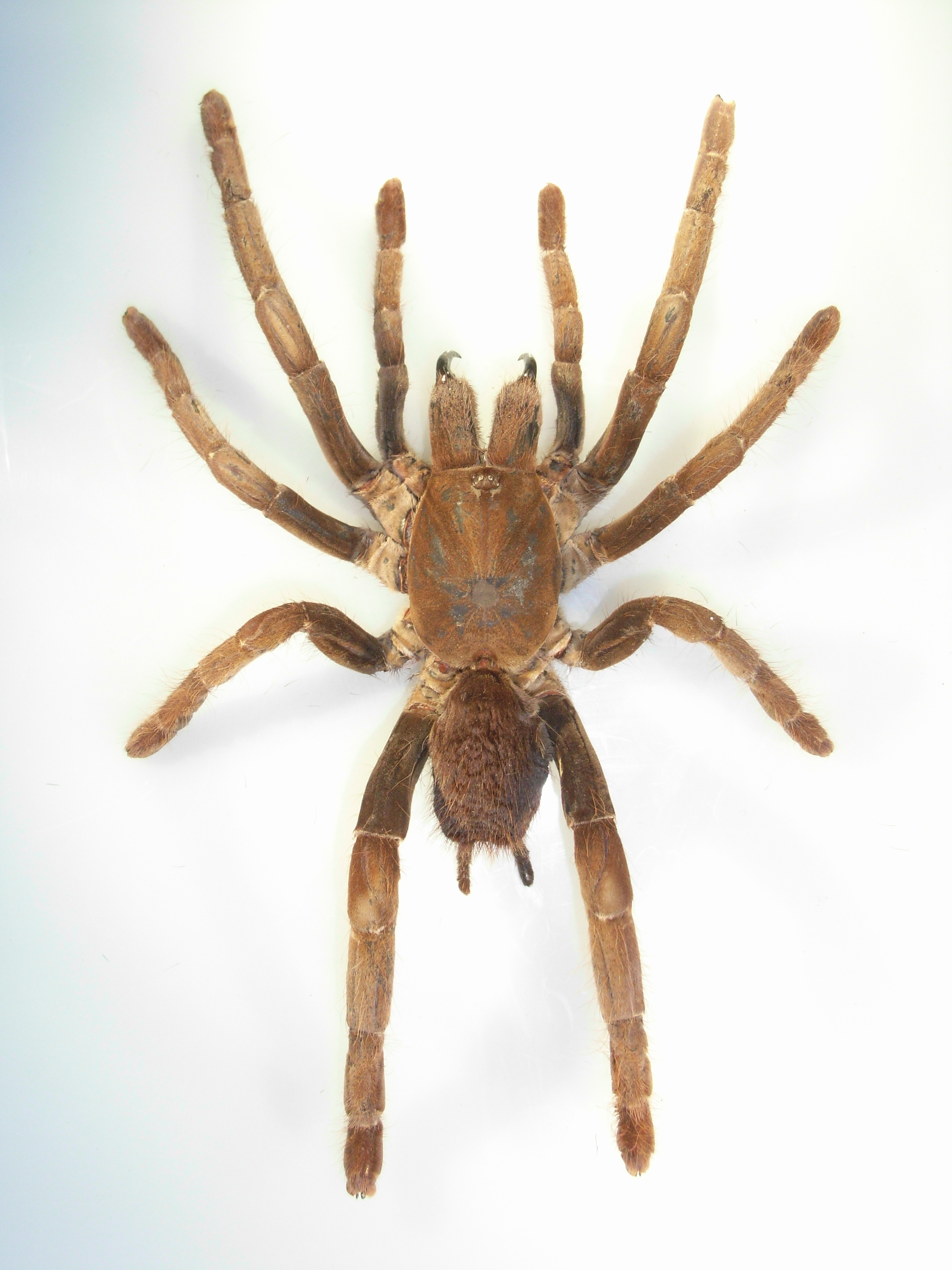
Hysterocrates hercules, female

Hysterocrates Simon, 1892

- Hysterocrates apostolicus Pocock, 1900 - São Tomé and Príncipe
- Hysterocrates celerierae (Smith, 1990) - Ivory Coast
- Hysterocrates crassipes Pocock, 1897 - Cameroon
- Hysterocrates didymus Pocock, 1900 - São Tomé and Príncipe
- Hysterocrates ederi Charpentier, 1995 - Equatorial Guinea (Bioko)
- Hysterocrates efuliensis (Smith, 1990) - Cameroon
- Hysterocrates elephantiasis (Berland, 1917) - Congo
- Hysterocrates gigas Pocock, 1897 - Cameroon
- Hysterocrates greeffi (Karsch, 1884) - Cameroon
- Hysterocrates greshoffi (Simon, 1891) (type) - Congo
- Hysterocrates hercules Pocock, 1900 - Nigeria
- Hysterocrates laticeps Pocock, 1897 - Cameroon
- Hysterocrates maximus Strand, 1906 - Cameroon
- Hysterocrates ochraceus Strand, 1907 - Cameroon, Congo
- Hysterocrates robustus Pocock, 1900 - Equatorial Guinea (Mbini)
  - Hysterocrates robustus sulcifer Strand, 1908 - Cameroon
- Hysterocrates scepticus Pocock, 1900 - São Tomé and Príncipe
- Hysterocrates sjostedti (Thorell, 1899) - Cameroon
- Hysterocrates weileri Strand, 1906 - Cameroon

== I ==
=== Idiothele ===
Idiothele

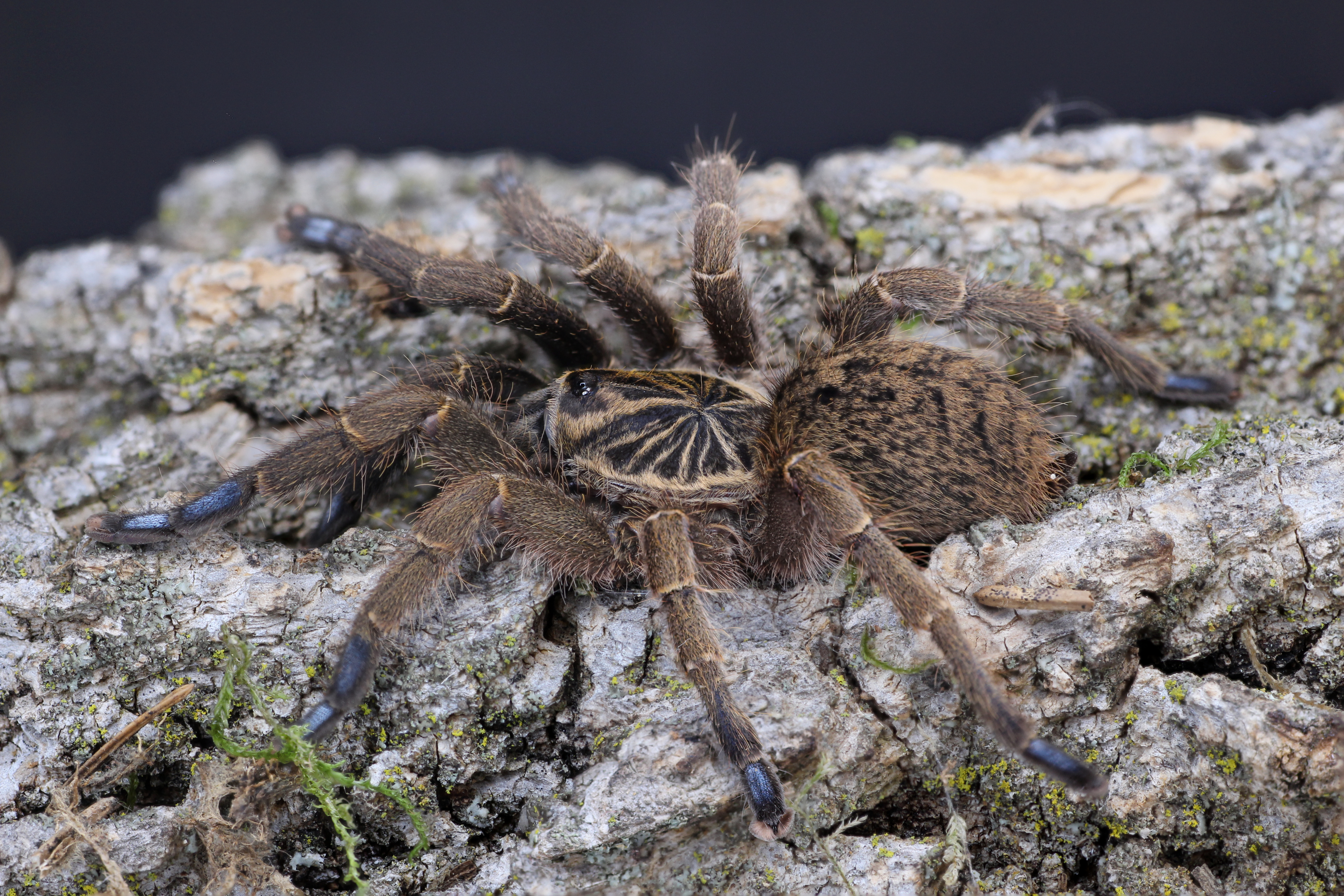
Idiothele mira

Idiothele Hewitt, 1919

- Idiothele mira Gallon, 2010 - South Africa
- Idiothele nigrofulva (Pocock, 1898) (type) - Southern Africa

=== Iridopelma ===
Iridopelma

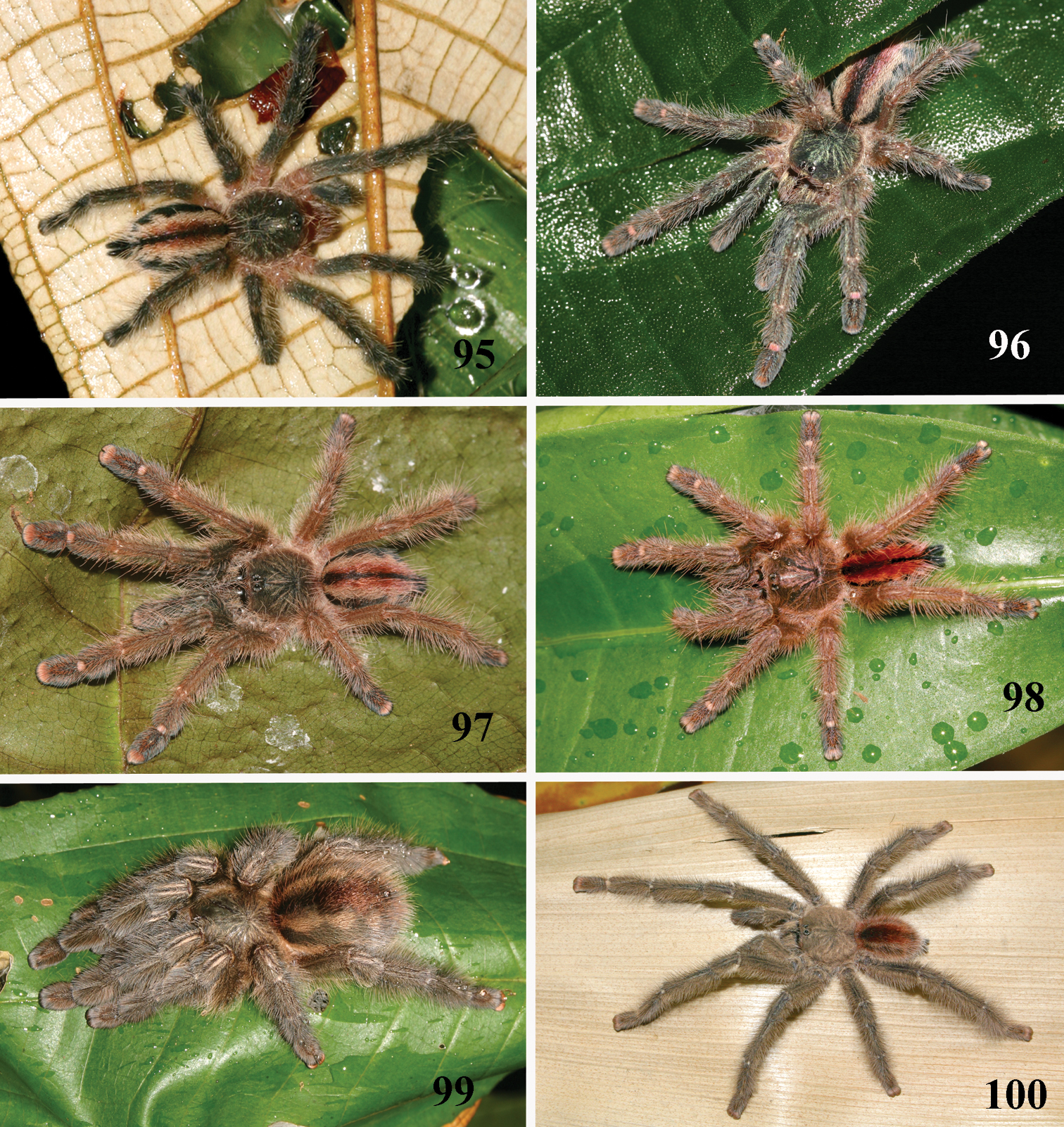
Iridopelma hirsutum

Iridopelma Pocock, 1901

- Iridopelma hirsutum Pocock, 1901 (type) - Brazil
- Iridopelma katiae Bertani, 2012 - Brazil
- Iridopelma marcoi Bertani, 2012 - Brazil
- Iridopelma oliveirai Bertani, 2012 - Brazil
- Iridopelma vanini Bertani, 2012 - Brazil
- Iridopelma zorodes (Mello-Leitão, 1926) - Brazil

=== Ischnocolus ===
Ischnocolus Ausserer, 1871

- Ischnocolus elongatus (Simon, 1873) - Morocco, Algeria
- Ischnocolus hancocki Smith, 1990 - Morocco
- Ischnocolus ignoratus Guadanucci & Wendt, 2014 - Syria, Palestine
- Ischnocolus jickelii L. Koch, 1875 - Djibouti, Ethiopia, Somalia, Yemen
- Ischnocolus rubropilosus Keyserling, 1891 - Brazil
- Ischnocolus tomentosus Thorell, 1899 - Cameroon, Congo
- Ischnocolus valentinus (Dufour, 1820) (type) - Spain, Italy (Sicily), Morocco, Algeria, Tunesia, Libya
- Ischnocolus vanandelae Montemor, West & Zamani, 2020 - Oman, Iran

== K ==
=== Kankuamo ===
Kankuamo

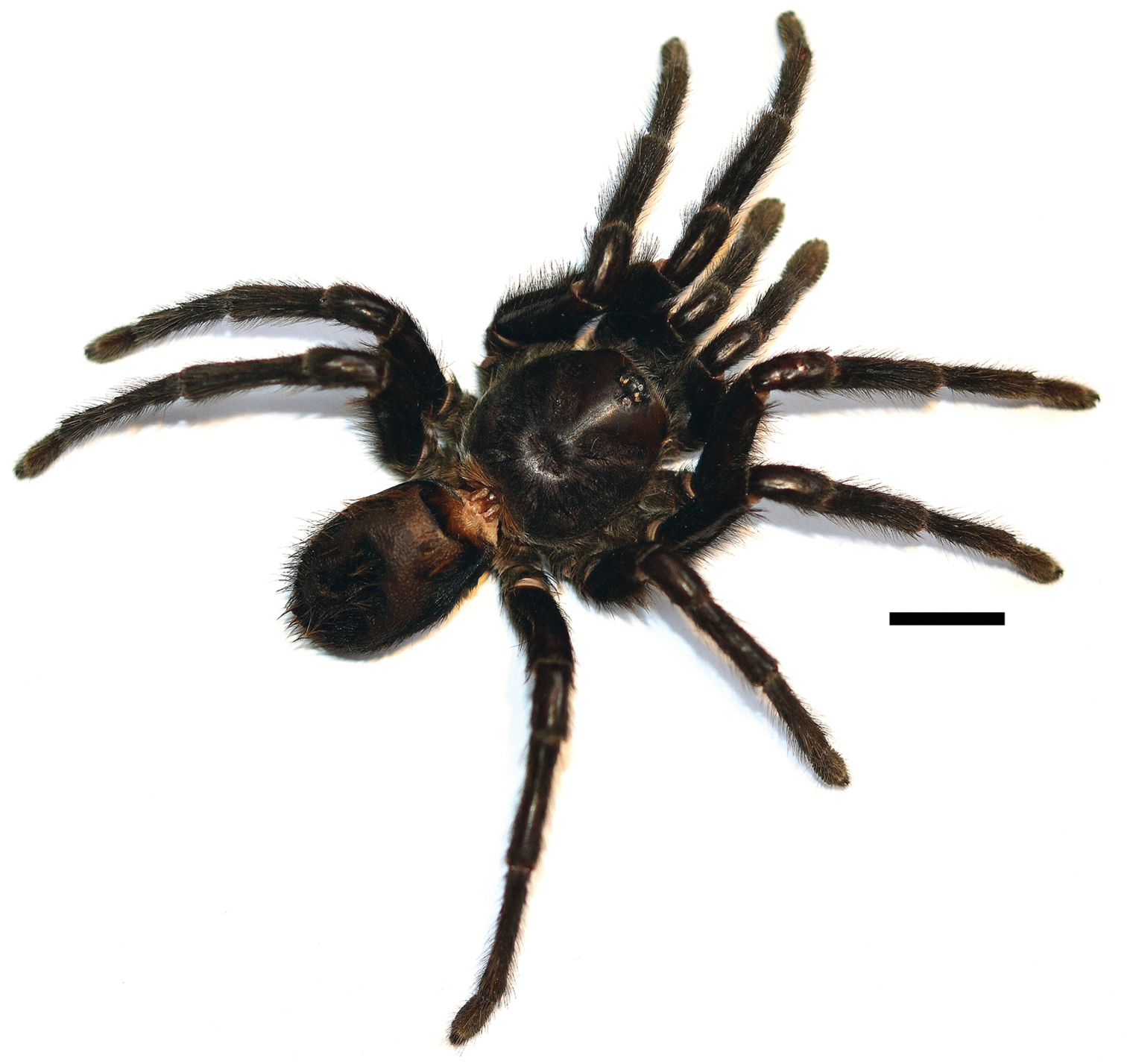
Kankuamo marquezi

Kankuamo Perafán, Galvis & Pérez-Miles, 2016

- Kankuamo marquezi Perafán, Galvis & Gutiérrez, 2016 (type) - Colombia

=== Kochiana ===
Kochiana Fukushima, Nagahama & Bertani, 2008

- Kochiana brunnipes (C. L. Koch, 1842) (type) - Brazil

== L ==
=== Lampropelma ===
Lampropelma Simon, 1892

- Lampropelma carpenteri (Smith & Jacobi, 2015) - Borneo, Indonesia
- Lampropelma nigerrimum Simon, 1892 (type) - Indonesia

=== Lasiocyano ===
Lasiocyano Galleti-Lima, Hamilton, Borges & Guadanucci, 2023

- Lasiocyano sazimai (Bertani, Nagahama & Fukushima, 2011) - Brazil

=== Lasiodora ===
Lasiodora

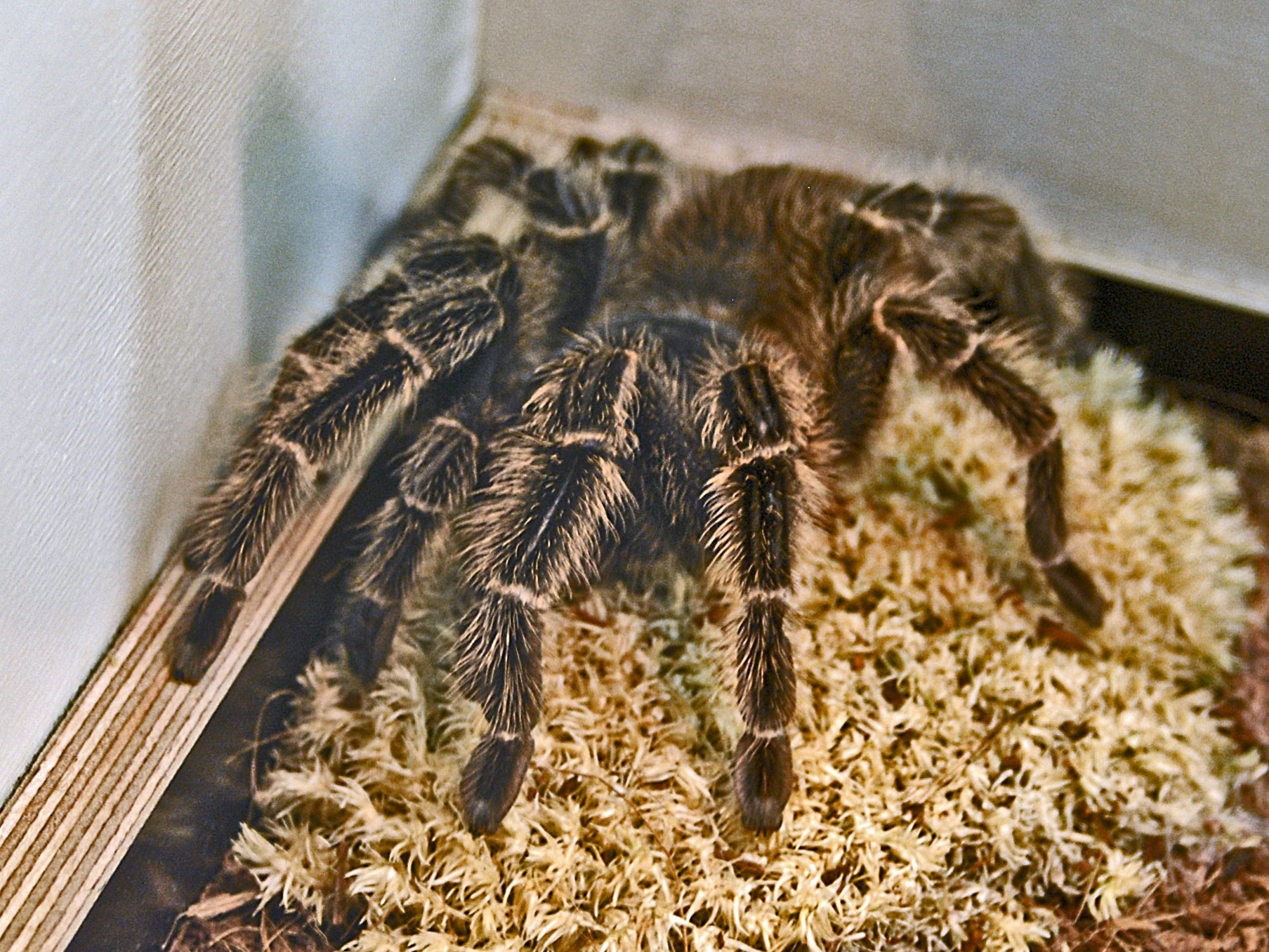
Brazilian red birdeater
(Lasiodora difficilis)

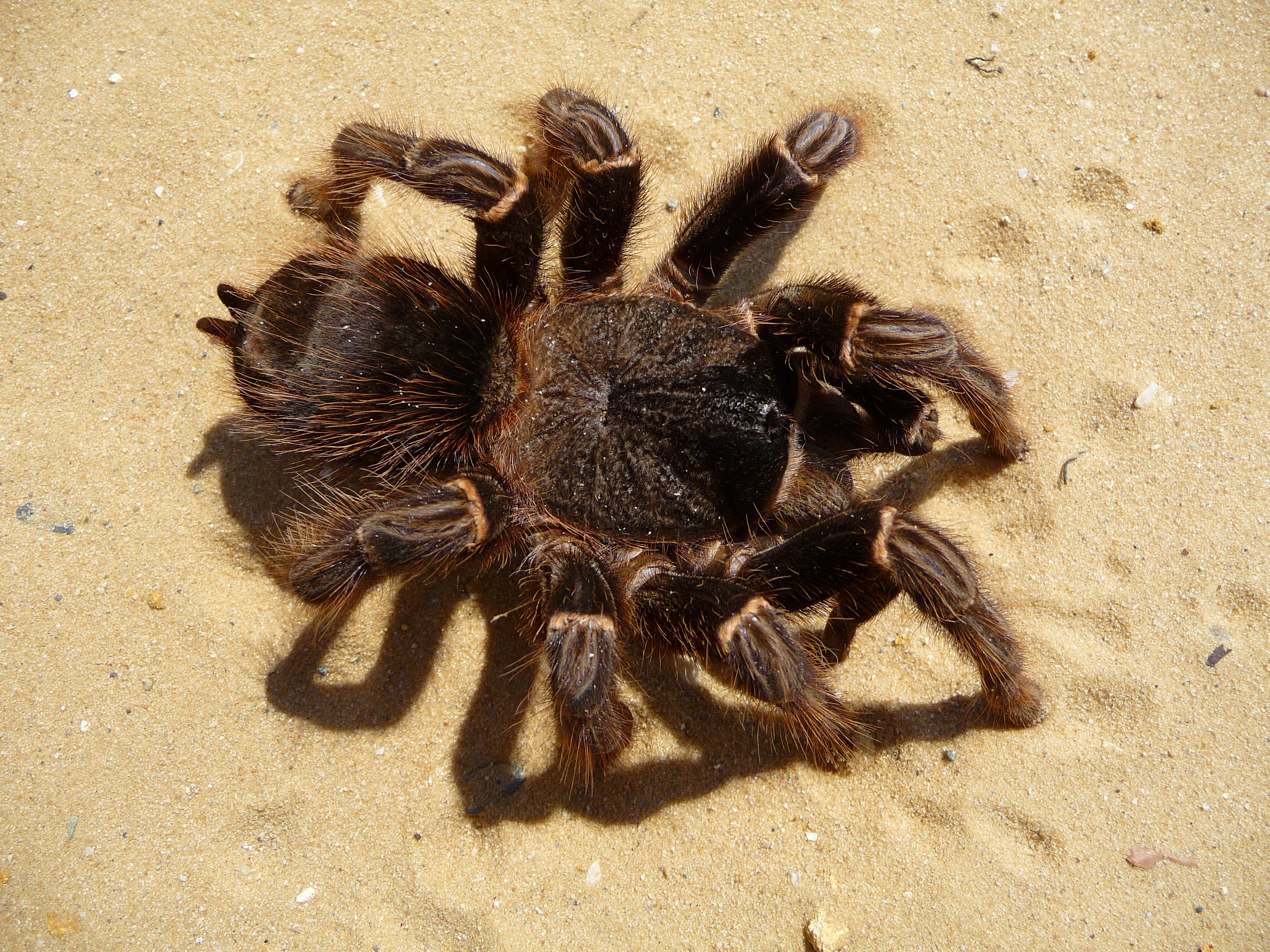
Brazilian salmon pink birdeater
(Lasiodora parahybana)

Lasiodora C. L. Koch, 1850

- Lasiodora acanthognatha Mello-Leitão, 1921 - Brazil
- Lasiodora benedeni Bertkau, 1880 - Brazil
- Lasiodora boliviana (Simon, 1892) - Bolivia
- Lasiodora brevibulba (Valerio, 1980) - Costa Rica
- Lasiodora carinata (Valerio, 1980) - Costa Rica
- Lasiodora citharacantha Mello-Leitão, 1921 - Brazil
- Lasiodora cristata (Mello-Leitão, 1923) - Brazil
- Lasiodora cryptostigma Mello-Leitão, 1921 - Brazil
- Lasiodora curtior Chamberlin, 1917 - Brazil
- Lasiodora differens Chamberlin, 1917 - Brazil
- Lasiodora difficilis Mello-Leitão, 1921 - Brazil
- Lasiodora dolichosterna Mello-Leitão, 1921 - Brazil
- Lasiodora dulcicola Mello-Leitão, 1921 - Brazil
- Lasiodora erythrocythara Mello-Leitão, 1921 - Brazil
- Lasiodora fallax (Bertkau, 1880) - Brazil
- Lasiodora fracta Mello-Leitão, 1921 - Brazil
- Lasiodora icecu (Valerio, 1980) - Costa Rica
- Lasiodora isabellina (Ausserer, 1871) - Brazil
- Lasiodora itabunae Mello-Leitão, 1921 - Brazil
- Lasiodora klugi (C. L. Koch, 1841) (type) - Brazil
- Lasiodora lakoi Mello-Leitão, 1943 - Brazil
- Lasiodora mariannae Mello-Leitão, 1921 - Brazil
- Lasiodora moreni (Holmberg, 1876) - Argentina
- Lasiodora pantherina (Keyserling, 1891) - Brazil
- Lasiodora parahybana Mello-Leitão, 1917 - Brazil
- Lasiodora pleoplectra Mello-Leitão, 1921 - Brazil
- Lasiodora puriscal (Valerio, 1980) - Costa Rica
- Lasiodora rubitarsa (Valerio, 1980) - Costa Rica
- Lasiodora saeva (Walckenaer, 1837) - Uruguay
- Lasiodora spinipes Ausserer, 1871 - Brazil
- Lasiodora sternalis (Mello-Leitão, 1923) - Brazil
- Lasiodora striatipes (Ausserer, 1871) - Brazil
- Lasiodora subcanens Mello-Leitão, 1921 - Brazil

=== Lasiodorides ===
Lasiodorides

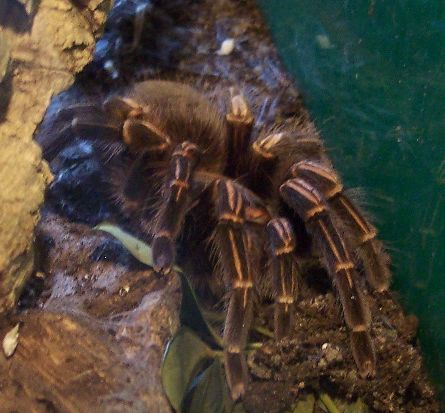
Lasiodorides striatus

Lasiodorides Schmidt & Bischoff, 1997

- Lasiodorides polycuspulatus Schmidt & Bischoff, 1997 (type) - Peru
- Lasiodorides striatus (Schmidt & Antonelli, 1996) - Peru

=== Longilyra ===
Longilyra Gabriel, 2014

- Longilyra johnlonghorni Gabriel, 2014 (type) - El Salvador

=== Loxomphalia ===
Loxomphalia Simon, 1889

- Loxomphalia rubida Simon, 1889 (type) - Tanzania (Zanzibar)

=== Loxoptygus ===
Loxoptygus Simon, 1903

- Loxoptygus coturnatus Simon, 1903 - Ethiopia
- Loxoptygus ectypus (Simon, 1889) (type) - Ethiopia

=== Lyrognathus ===
Lyrognathus

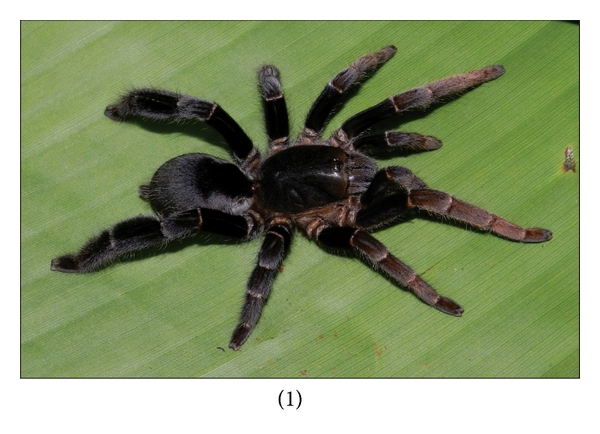
Lyrognathus giannisposatoi

Lyrognathus Pocock, 1895

- Lyrognathus achilles West & Nunn, 2010 - Borneo
- Lyrognathus crotalus Pocock, 1895 (type) - India
- Lyrognathus fuscus West & Nunn, 2010 - Borneo
- Lyrognathus giannisposatoi Nunn & West, 2013 - Indonesia (Sumatra)
- Lyrognathus lessunda West & Nunn, 2010 - Indonesia (Lombok)
- Lyrognathus robustus Smith, 1988 - Malaysia
- Lyrognathus saltator Pocock, 1900 - India

== M ==
=== Magnacarina ===
Magnacarina Mendoza, Locht, Kaderka, Medina & Pérez-Miles, 2016

- Magnacarina aldana (West, 2000) (type) - Mexico
- Magnacarina cancer Mendoza & Locht, 2016 - Mexico
- Magnacarina moderata Locht, Mendoza & Medina, 2016 - Mexico
- Magnacarina primaverensis Mendoza & Locht, 2016 - Mexico

=== Mascaraneus ===
Mascaraneus Gallon, 2005

- Mascaraneus remotus Gallon, 2005 (type) - Mauritius

=== Megaphobema ===
Megaphobema

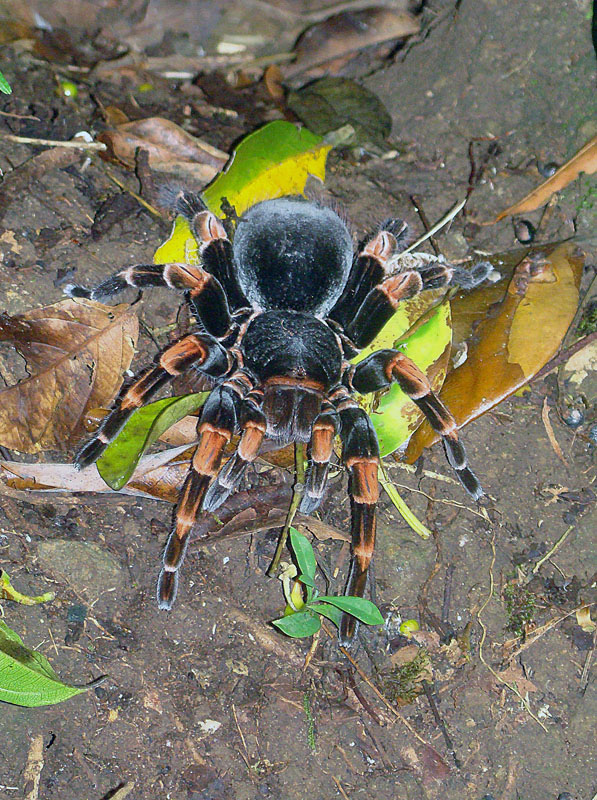
Orange kneed tarantula
(Megaphobema mesomelas)

Megaphobema Pocock, 1901

- Megaphobema mesomelas (O. Pickard-Cambridge, 1892) - Costa Rica
- Megaphobema peterklaasi Schmidt, 1994 - Costa Rica
- Megaphobema robustum (Ausserer, 1875) (type) - Colombia
- Megaphobema teceae Pérez-Miles, Miglio & Bonaldo, 2006 - Brazil
- Megaphobema velvetosoma Schmidt, 1995 - Ecuador

=== Melloina ===
Melloina Brignoli, 1985

- Melloina gracilis (Schenkel, 1953) (type) - Venezuela
- Melloina rickwesti Raven, 1999 - Panama
- Melloina santuario Bertani, 2013 - Venezuela

=== Melognathus ===
Melognathus Chamberlin, 1917

- Melognathus dromeus Chamberlin, 1917 (type) - Philippines

=== Metriopelma ===
Metriopelma Becker, 1878

- Metriopelma breyeri (Becker, 1878) (type) - Mexico

=== Miaschistopus ===
Miaschistopus Pocock, 1897

- Miaschistopus tetricus (Simon, 1889) (type) - Venezuela

=== Monocentropus ===
Monocentropus

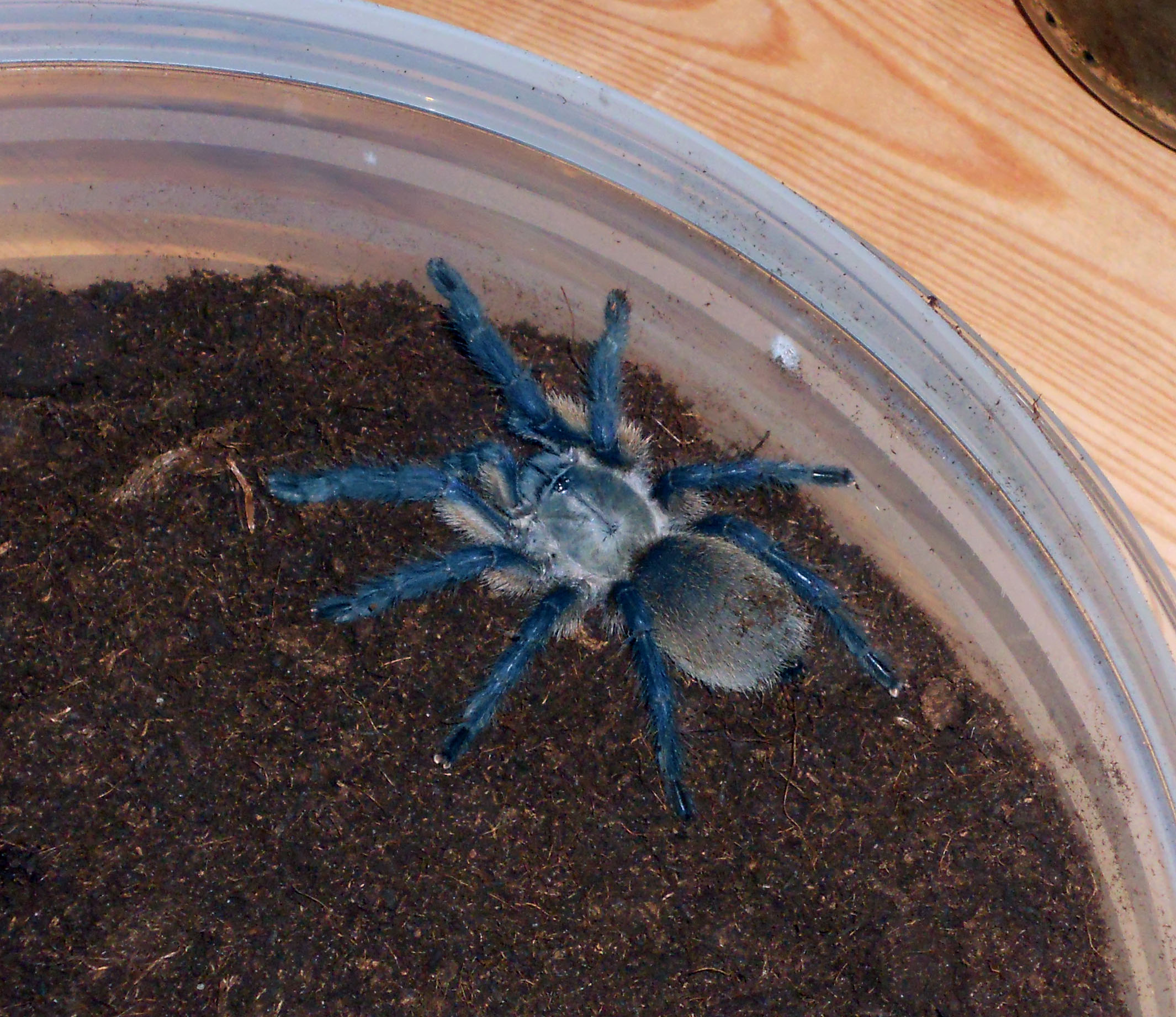
Monocentropus balfouri

Monocentropus Pocock, 1897

- Monocentropus balfouri Pocock, 1897 (type) - Yemen (Socotra)
- Monocentropus lambertoni Fage, 1922 - Madagascar
- Monocentropus longimanus Pocock, 1903 - Yemen

=== Munduruku ===
Munduruku Miglio, Bonaldo & Pérez-Miles, 2013

- Munduruku bicoloratum Miglio, Bonaldo & Pérez-Miles, 2013 (type) - Brazil

=== Murphyarachne ===
Murphyarachne Sherwood & Gabriel, 2022

- Murphyarachne ymasumacae Sherwood & Gabriel, 2022 (type) - Peru

=== Mygalarachne ===
Mygalarachne Ausserer, 1871

- Mygalarachne brevipes Ausserer, 1871 (type) - Honduras

=== Myostola ===
Myostola Simon, 1903

- Myostola occidentalis (Lucas, 1858) (type) - Gabon, Cameroon

== N ==
=== Neischnocolus ===
Neischnocolus Petrunkevitch, 1925

- Neischnocolus amazonica (Jimenez & Bertani, 2008) - Colombia
- Neischnocolus armihuariensis (Kaderka, 2014) - Peru
- Neischnocolus caxiuana (Pérez-Miles, Miglio & Bonaldo, 2008) - Brazil
- Neischnocolus iquitos Kaderka, 2020 - Peru
- Neischnocolus obscurus (Ausserer, 1875) - Colombia
- Neischnocolus panamanus Petrunkevitch, 1925 (type) - Panama
- Neischnocolus pijaos (Jimenez & Bertani, 2008) - Colombia
- Neischnocolus samonellaacademy (Peñaherrera-R., León-E., Guerrero-Campoverde, Gabriel, Sherwood & Cisneros-Heredia, 2025) - Ecuador
- Neischnocolus valentinae (Almeida, Salvatierra & de Morais, 2019) - Brazil
- Neischnocolus weinmanni (Pérez-Miles, 2008) - Venezuela
- Neischnocolus yupanquii (Pérez-Miles, Gabriel & Gallon, 2008) - Ecuador

=== Neoheterophrictus ===
Neoheterophrictus

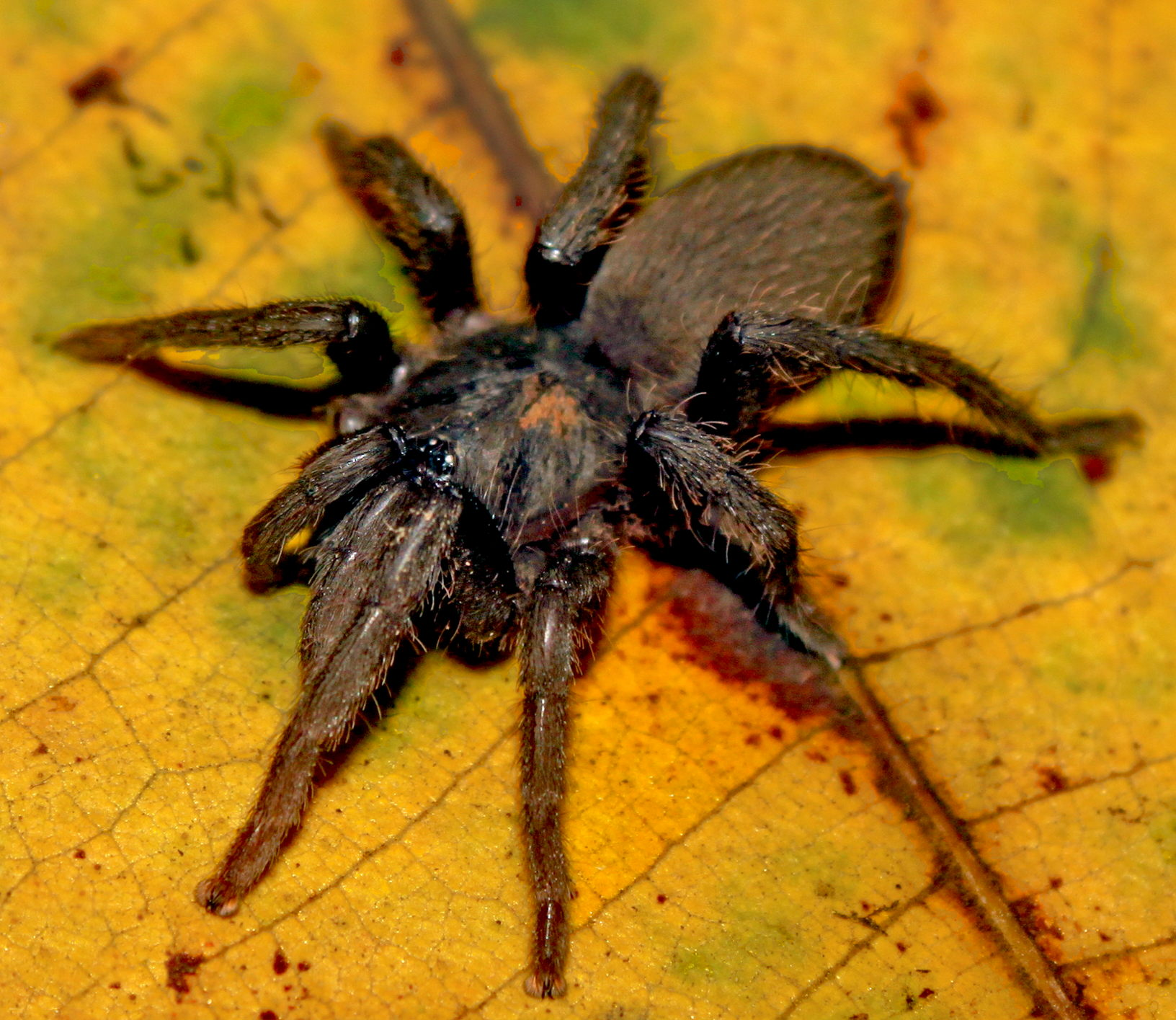
Neoheterophrictus smithi, female

Neoheterophrictus Siliwal & Raven, 2012

- Neoheterophrictus amboli Mirza & Sanap, 2014 - India
- Neoheterophrictus bhori (Gravely, 1915) - India
- Neoheterophrictus chimminiensis Sunil Jose, 2020 - India
- Neoheterophrictus crurofulvus Siliwal, Gupta & Raven, 2012 (type) - India
- Neoheterophrictus madraspatanus (Gravely, 1935) - India
- Neoheterophrictus sahyadri Siliwal, Gupta & Raven, 2012 - India
- Neoheterophrictus smithi Mirza, Bhosale & Sanap, 2014 - India
- Neoheterophrictus uttarakannada Siliwal, Gupta & Raven, 2012 - India

=== Neoholothele ===
Neoholothele Guadanucci & Weinmann, 2015

- Neoholothele fasciaaurinigra Guadanucci & Weinmann, 2015 - Colombia
- Neoholothele incei (F. O. Pickard-Cambridge, 1899) (type) - Trinidad and Tobago, Venezuela

=== Neostenotarsus ===
Neostenotarsus Pribik & Weinmann, 2004

- Neostenotarsus guianensis (Caporiacco, 1954) - French Guiana

=== Nesiergus ===
Nesiergus Simon, 1903

- Nesiergus gardineri (Hirst, 1911) - Seychelles
- Nesiergus halophilus Benoit, 1978 - Seychelles
- Nesiergus insulanus Simon, 1903 (type) - Seychelles

=== Nesipelma ===
Nesipelma Schmidt & Kovařík, 1996

- Nesipelma insulare Schmidt & Kovařík, 1996 (type) - St. Kitts and Nevis (Nevis)
- Nesipelma medium (Chamberlin, 1917) - St. Kitts and Nevis (St. Kitts)

=== Nhandu ===
Nhandu

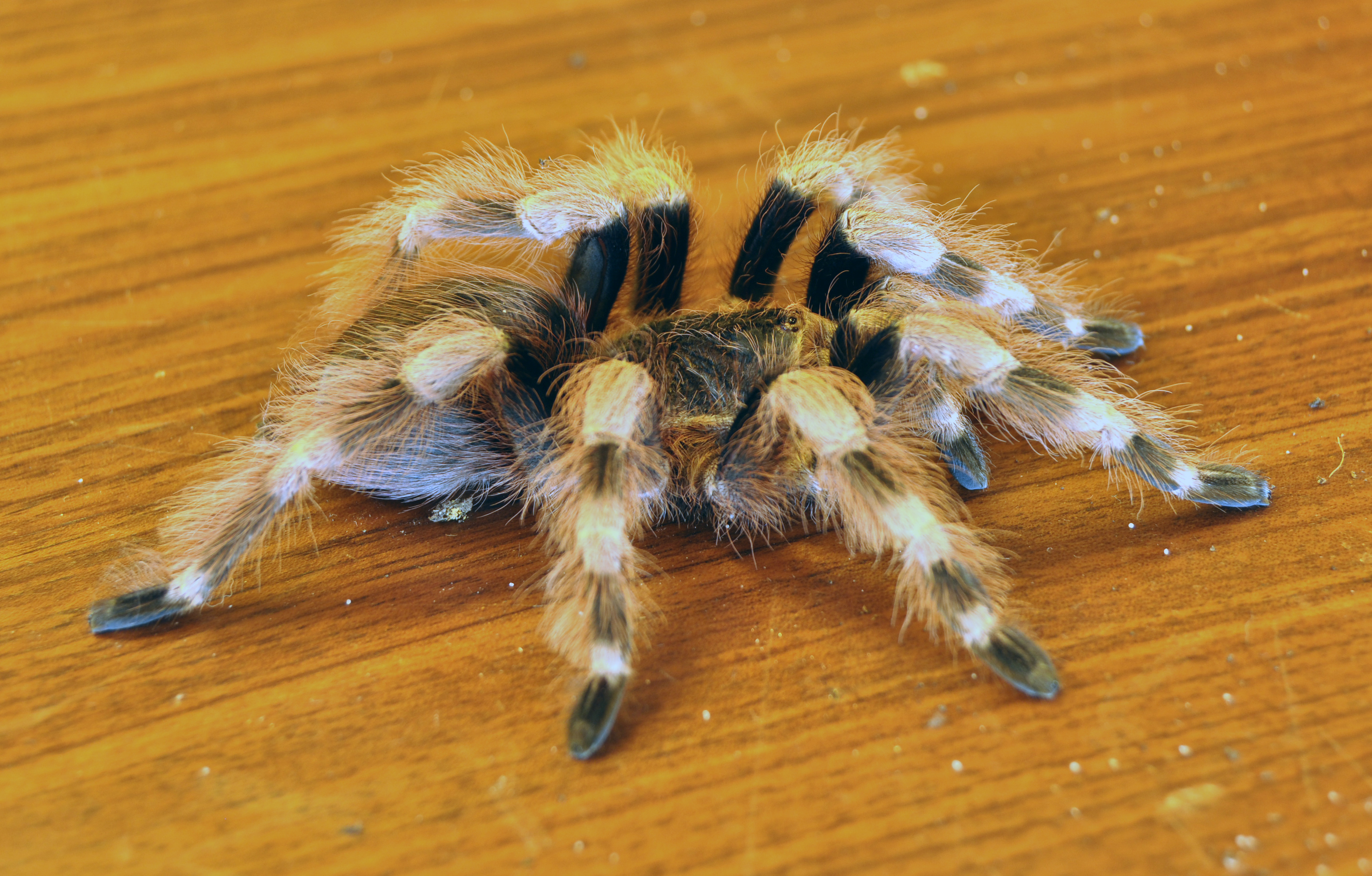
Nhandu coloratovillosus

Nhandu Lucas, 1983

- Nhandu carapoensis Lucas, 1983 (type) - Brazil, Paraguay
- Nhandu cerradensis Bertani, 2001 - Brazil
- Nhandu chromatus Schmidt, 2004 - Brazil
- Nhandu coloratovillosus (Schmidt, 1998) - Brazil
- Nhandu sylviae (Sherwood, Gabriel & Brescovit, 2023) – Guyana
- Nhandu tripepii (Dresco, 1984) - Brazil

== O ==
=== Omothymus ===
Omothymus Thorell, 1891

- Omothymus fuchsi (Strand, 1906) - Indonesia (Sumatra)
- Omothymus rafni Gabriel & Sherwood, 2019 - Indonesia (Sumatra)
- Omothymus schioedtei Thorell, 1891 (type) - Malaysia
- Omothymus violaceopes (Abraham, 1924) - Malaysia, Singapore

=== Ornithoctonus ===
Ornithoctonus Pocock, 1892

- Ornithoctonus andersoni Pocock, 1892 (type) - Myanmar
- Ornithoctonus aureotibialis von Wirth & Striffler, 2005 - Thailand
- Ornithoctonus costalis (Schmidt, 1998) - Thailand

=== Orphnaecus ===
Orphnaecus

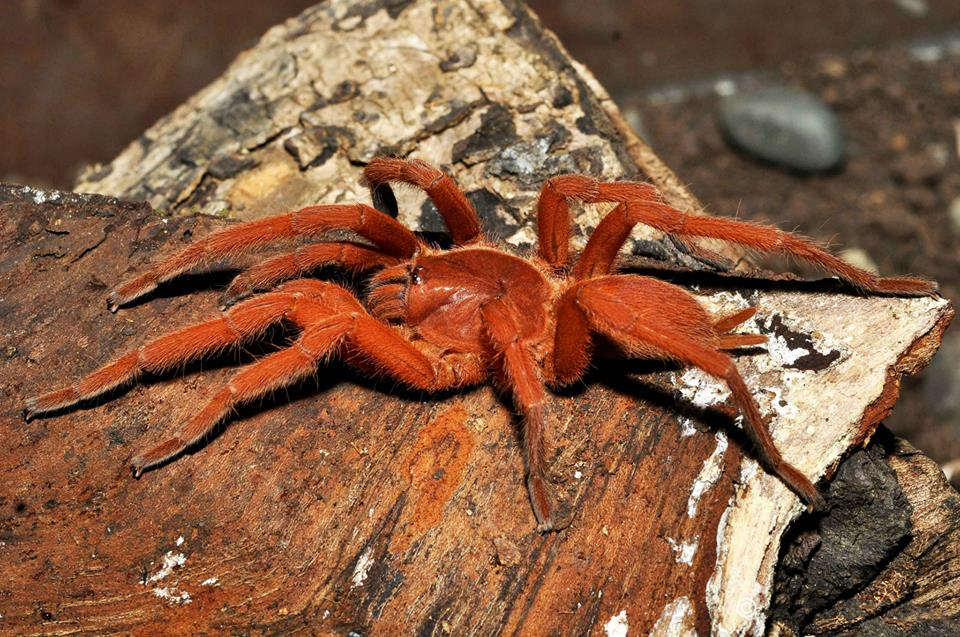
Philippine orange tarantula
(Orphnaecus philippinus)

Orphnaecus Simon, 1892

- Orphnaecus adamsoni Salamanes, Santos, Austria & Villancio, 2022 - Philippines
- Orphnaecus dichromatus (Schmidt & von Wirth, 1992) - New Guinea
- Orphnaecus kwebaburdeos (Barrion-Dupo, Barrion & Rasalan, 2015) - Philippines
- Orphnaecus pellitus Simon, 1892 (type) - Philippines
- Orphnaecus philippinus (Schmidt, 1999) - Philippines

=== Ozopactus ===
Ozopactus Simon, 1889

- Ozopactus ernsti Simon, 1889 (type) - Venezuela

== P ==
=== Pachistopelma ===
Pachistopelma

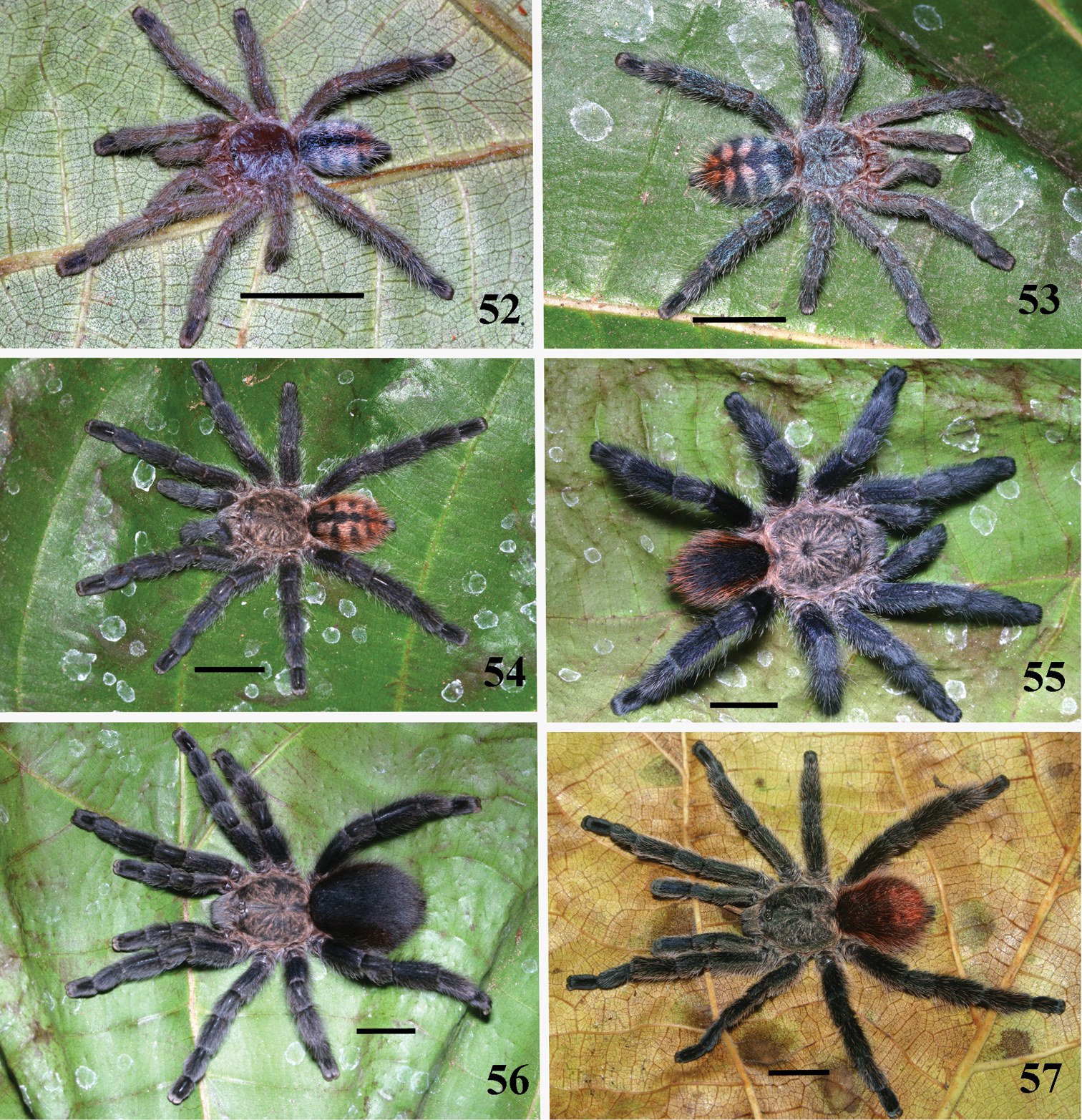
Pachistopelma bromelicola

Pachistopelma Pocock, 1901

- Pachistopelma bromelicola Bertani, 2012 - Brazil
- Pachistopelma rufonigrum Pocock, 1901 (type) - Brazil

=== Pamphobeteus ===
Pamphobeteus Pocock, 1901

- Pamphobeteus antinous Pocock, 1903 - Peru, Bolivia
- Pamphobeteus augusti (Simon, 1889) - Ecuador
- Pamphobeteus crassifemur Bertani, Fukushima & Silva, 2008 - Brazil
- Pamphobeteus ferox (Ausserer, 1875) - Colombia
- Pamphobeteus fortis (Ausserer, 1875) - Colombia
- Pamphobeteus grandis Bertani, Fukushima & Silva, 2008 - Brazil
- Pamphobeteus insignis Pocock, 1903 - Colombia
- Pamphobeteus nigricolor (Ausserer, 1875) (type) - Colombia, Brazil
- Pamphobeteus ornatus Pocock, 1903 - Panama, Colombia
- Pamphobeteus petersi Schmidt, 2002 - Ecuador, Peru
- Pamphobeteus sucreorum Gabriel & Sherwood, 2022 - Panama
- Pamphobeteus ultramarinus Schmidt, 1995 - Ecuador
- Pamphobeteus verdolaga Cifuentes, Perafán & Estrada-Gomez, 2016 - Colombia
- Pamphobeteus vespertinus (Simon, 1889) - Ecuador

=== Pelinobius ===
Pelinobius

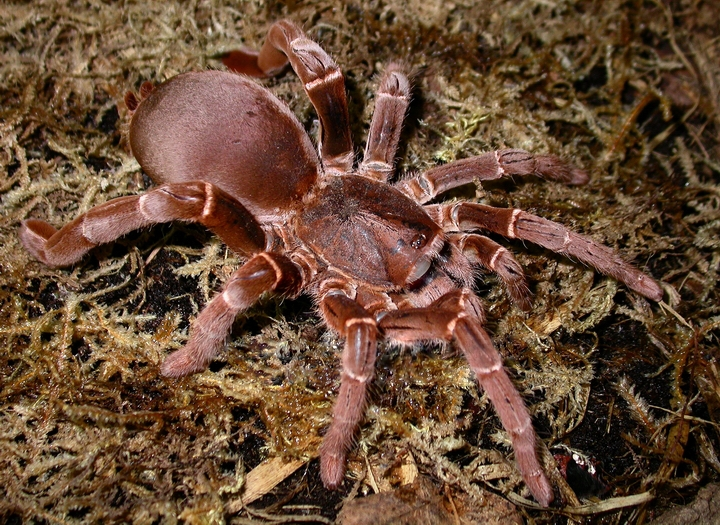
King baboon spider
(Pelinobius muticus)

Pelinobius Karsch, 1885

- Pelinobius muticus Karsch, 1885 (type) - Kenya, Tanzania

=== Phlogiellus ===
Phlogiellus

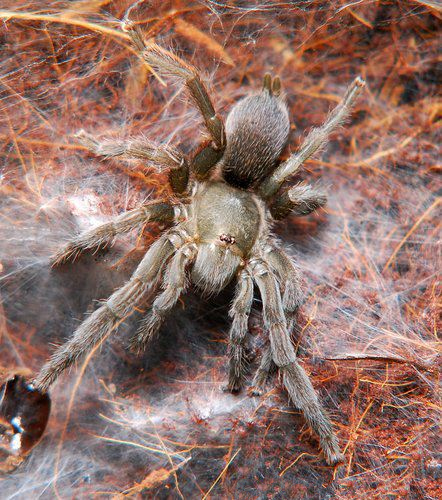
Phlogiellus baeri

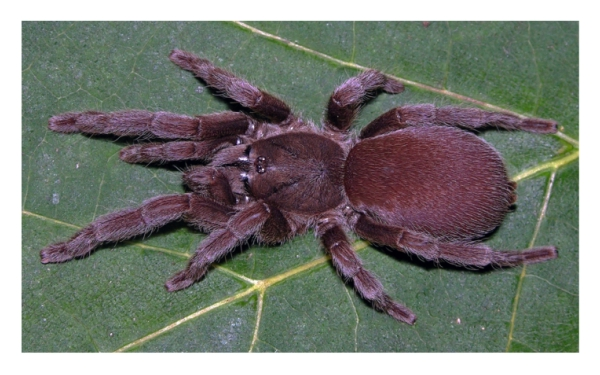
Phlogiellus bogadeki

Phlogiellus Pocock, 1897

- Phlogiellus aper (Simon, 1891) - Indonesia (Java)
- Phlogiellus atriceps Pocock, 1897 (type) - Indonesia (Java)
- Phlogiellus baeri (Simon, 1877) - Philippines
- Phlogiellus bicolor Strand, 1911 - Papua New Guinea (New Britain)
- Phlogiellus bogadeki Nunn, West & von Wirth, 2016 - China (Hong Kong)
- Phlogiellus brevipes (Thorell, 1897) - Myanmar
- Phlogiellus bundokalbo (Barrion & Litsinger, 1995) - Philippines
- Phlogiellus daweiensis Sivayyapram & Warrit, 2020 - Myanmar
- Phlogiellus inermis (Ausserer, 1871) - Malaysia to Indonesia (Lombok)
- Phlogiellus insulanus (Hirst, 1909) - Indonesia (Sulawesi)
  - Phlogiellus insulanus borneoensis (Schmidt, 2015) - Borneo
- Phlogiellus insularis (Simon, 1877) - Philippines
- Phlogiellus jiaxiangi Lin & Li, 2021 - China
- Phlogiellus johnreylazoi Nunn, West & von Wirth, 2016 - Philippines (Palawan Is.)
- Phlogiellus longipalpus Chomphuphuang, Smith, Wongvilas, Sivayyapram, Songsangchote & Warrit, 2017 - Thailand
- Phlogiellus moniqueverdezae Nunn, West & von Wirth, 2016 - Thailand
- Phlogiellus mutus (Giltay, 1935) - Philippines
- Phlogiellus nebulosus (Rainbow, 1899) - Solomon Is.
- Phlogiellus obscurus (Hirst, 1909) - Malaysia (Borneo)
- Phlogiellus ornatus (Thorell, 1897) - Myanmar
- Phlogiellus orophilus (Thorell, 1897) - Myanmar
- Phlogiellus pelidnus Nunn, West & von Wirth, 2016 - Malaysia (Borneo)
- Phlogiellus quanyui Lin, Li & Chen, 2021 - China (Hainan)
- Phlogiellus raveni Sivayyapram & Warrit, 2020 - Philippines (Cebu)
- Phlogiellus subinermis (Giltay, 1934) - Southeast Asia
- Phlogiellus watasei (Kishida, 1920) - Taiwan
- Phlogiellus xinping (Zhu & Zhang, 2008) - China

=== Phoneyusa ===
Phoneyusa

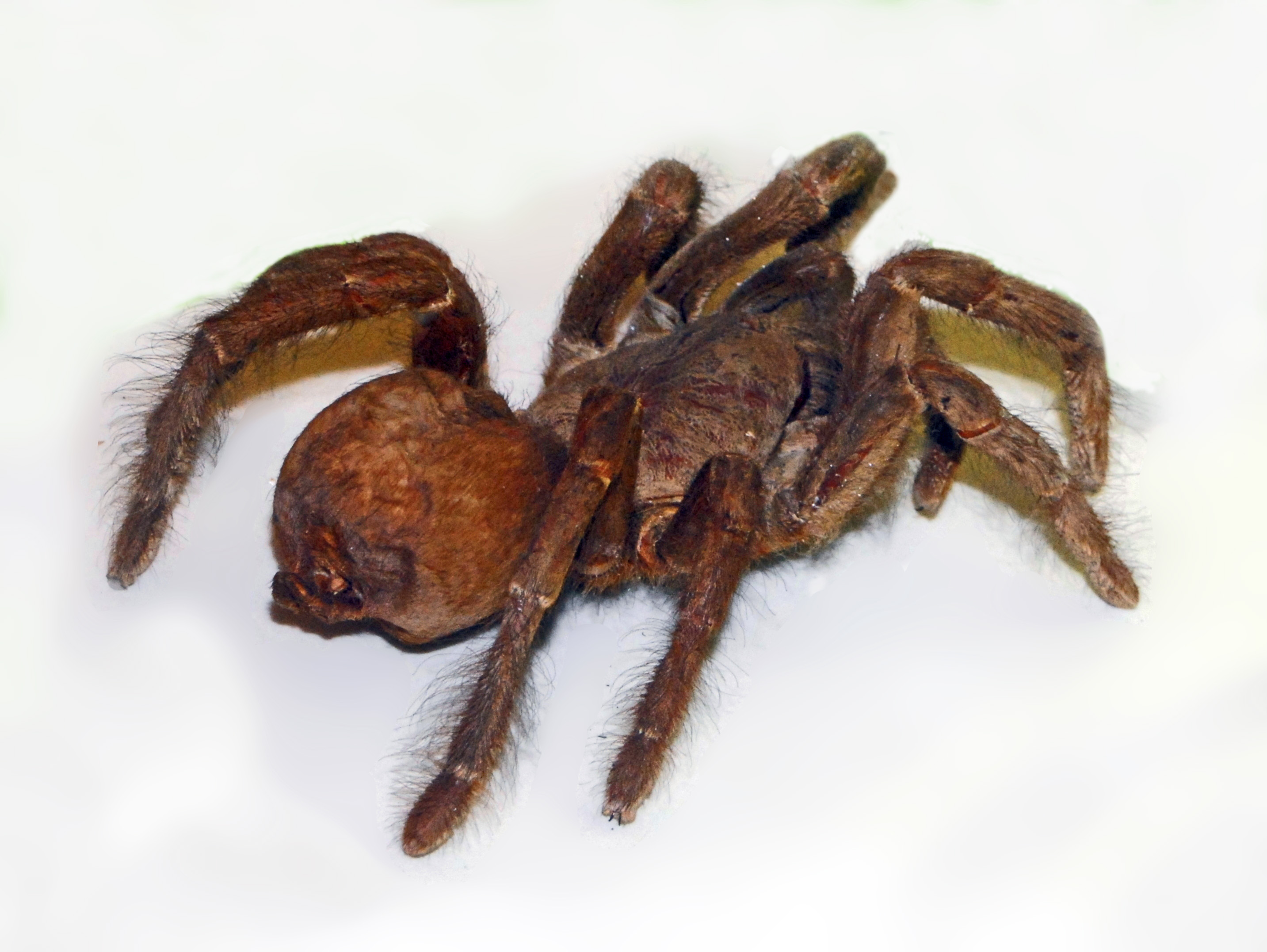
Phoneyusa lesserti

Phoneyusa Karsch, 1884

- Phoneyusa antilope (Simon, 1889) - Congo
- Phoneyusa belandana Karsch, 1884 (type) - Central African Rep.
- Phoneyusa bidentata Pocock, 1900 - West, Central Africa
  - Phoneyusa bidentata ituriensis Laurent, 1946 - Congo
- Phoneyusa bouvieri Berland, 1917 - Madagascar
- Phoneyusa buettneri Karsch, 1886 - Gabon
- Phoneyusa chevalieri Simon, 1906 - West Africa
- Phoneyusa cultridens Berland, 1917 - Congo
- Phoneyusa gabonica (Simon, 1889) - Gabon
- Phoneyusa giltayi Laurent, 1946 - Congo
- Phoneyusa gracilipes (Simon, 1889) - Angola
- Phoneyusa lesserti Dresco, 1973 - Central African Rep.
- Phoneyusa manicata Simon, 1907 - São Tomé and Príncipe
- Phoneyusa principium Simon, 1907 - São Tomé and Príncipe
- Phoneyusa rutilata (Simon, 1907) - Guinea-Bissau
- Phoneyusa westi Smith, 1990 - Angola

=== Phormictopus ===
Phormictopus

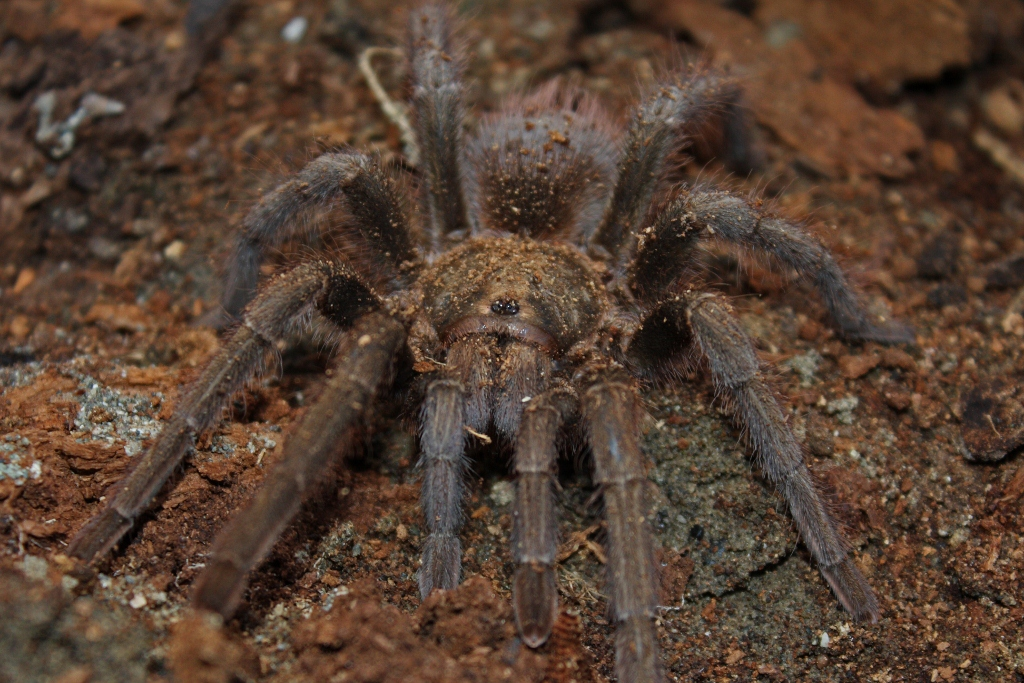
Cuban bronze tarantula (Phormictopus auratus)

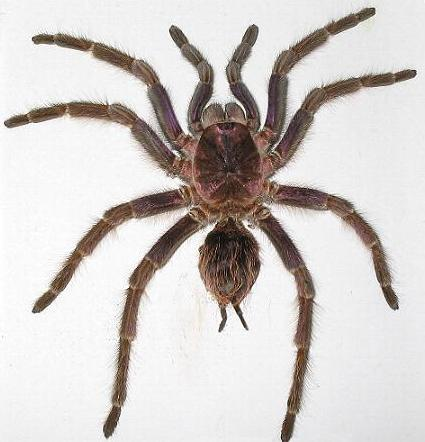
Hispaniola giant tarantula
(Phormictopus cancerides)

Phormictopus Pocock, 1901

- Phormictopus atrichomatus Schmidt, 1991 - probably Hispaniola
- Phormictopus auratus Ortiz & Bertani, 2005 - Cuba
- Phormictopus australis Mello-Leitão, 1941 - Argentina
- Phormictopus bistriatus Rudloff, 2008 - Cuba
- Phormictopus cancerides (Latreille, 1806) (type) - Caribbean to Brazil
- Phormictopus cautus (Ausserer, 1875) - Cuba
- Phormictopus cochleasvorax Rudloff, 2008 - Cuba
- Phormictopus cubensis Chamberlin, 1917 - Cuba
- Phormictopus fritzschei Rudloff, 2008 - Cuba
- Phormictopus jonai Rudloff, 2008 - Cuba
- Phormictopus melodermus Chamberlin, 1917 - Hispaniola
- Phormictopus platus Chamberlin, 1917 - USA or Hispaniola
- Phormictopus ribeiroi Mello-Leitão, 1923 - Brazil
- Phormictopus schepanskii Rudloff, 2008 - Cuba

=== Phormingochilus ===
Phormingochilus Pocock, 1895

- Phormingochilus arboricola (Schmidt & Barensteiner, 2015) – Borneo
- Phormingochilus everetti Pocock, 1895 (type) – Borneo
- Phormingochilus pennellhewlettorum Smith & Jacobi, 2015 – Malaysia (Borneo)
- Phormingochilus tigrinus Pocock, 1895 – Borneo

=== Phrixotrichus ===
Phrixotrichus Simon, 1889

- Phrixotrichus jara Perafán & Pérez-Miles, 2014 - Chile
- Phrixotrichus pucara Ferretti, 2015 - Argentina
- Phrixotrichus scrofa (Molina, 1782) - Chile, Argentina
- Phrixotrichus vulpinus (Karsch, 1880) (type) - Chile, Argentina

=== Plesiopelma ===
Plesiopelma Pocock, 1901

- Plesiopelma aspidosperma Ferretti & Barneche, 2013 - Argentina
- Plesiopelma gertschi (Caporiacco, 1955) - Venezuela
- Plesiopelma imperatrix Piza, 1976 - Brazil
- Plesiopelma insulare (Mello-Leitão, 1923) - Brazil
- Plesiopelma longisternale (Schiapelli & Gerschman, 1942) - Argentina, Uruguay
- Plesiopelma minense (Mello-Leitão, 1943) - Brazil
- Plesiopelma myodes Pocock, 1901 (type) - Uruguay
- Plesiopelma paganoi Ferretti & Barneche, 2013 - Argentina
- Plesiopelma physopus (Mello-Leitão, 1926) - Brazil
- Plesiopelma rectimanum (Mello-Leitão, 1923) - Brazil
- Plesiopelma semiaurantiacum (Simon, 1897) - Paraguay, Uruguay

=== Plesiophrictus ===
Plesiophrictus Pocock, 1899

- Plesiophrictus fabrei (Simon, 1892) - India
- Plesiophrictus linteatus (Simon, 1891) - India
- Plesiophrictus meghalayaensis Tikader, 1977 - India
- Plesiophrictus millardi Pocock, 1899 (type) - India
- Plesiophrictus nilagiriensis Siliwal, Molur & Raven, 2007 - India
- Plesiophrictus senffti (Strand, 1907) - Micronesia
- Plesiophrictus sericeus Pocock, 1900 - India
- Plesiophrictus tenuipes Pocock, 1899 - Sri Lanka

=== Poecilotheria ===
Poecilotheria

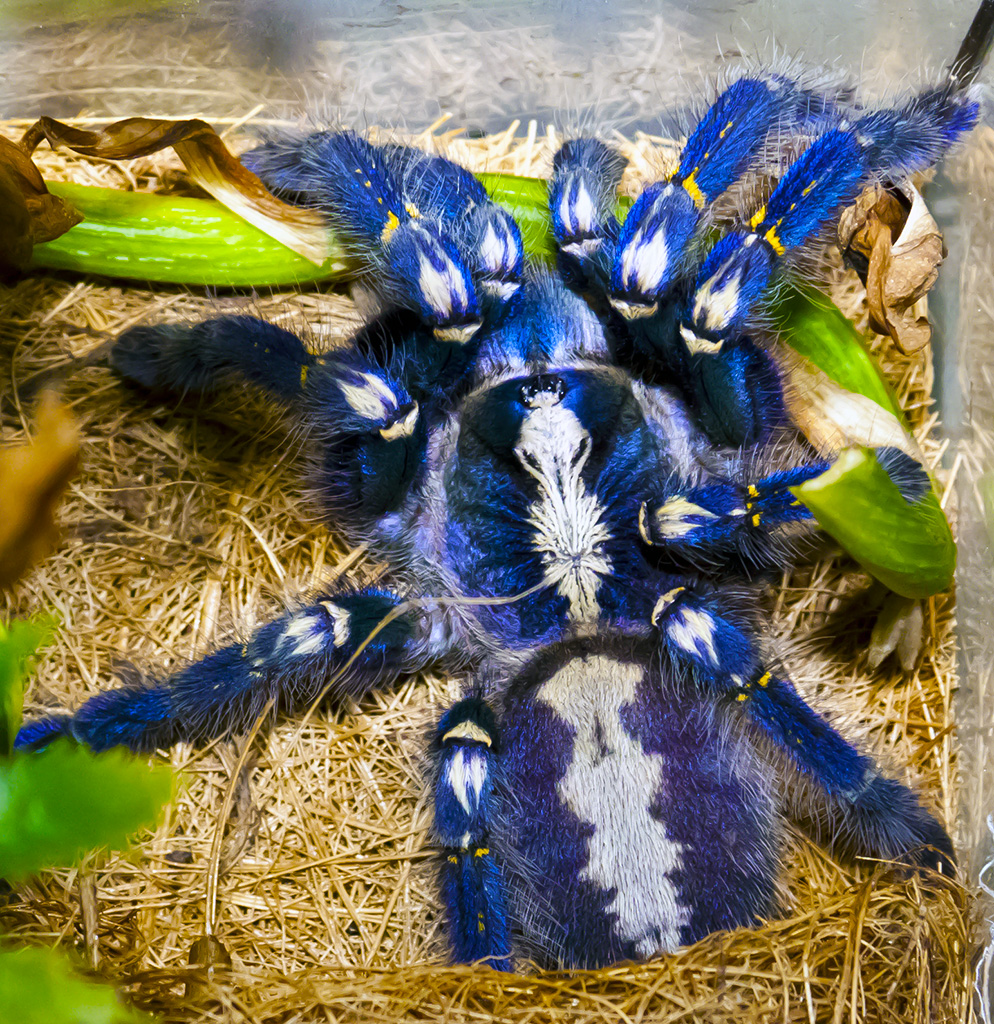
Poecilotheria metallica

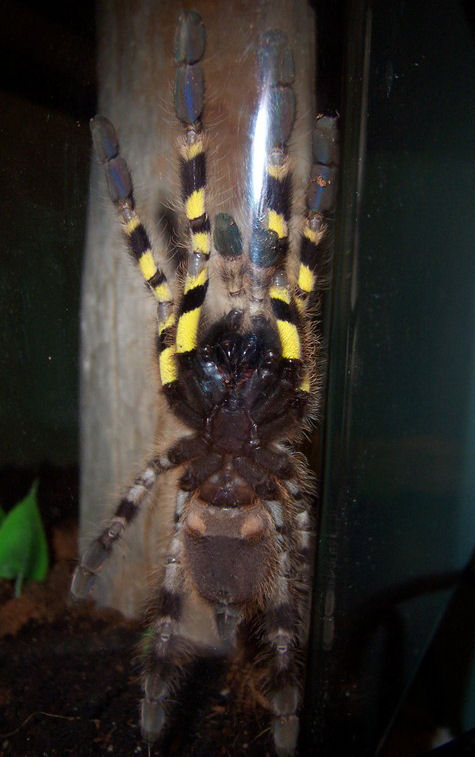
Indian ornamental
(Poecilotheria regalis), female

Poecilotheria Simon, 1885

- Poecilotheria fasciata (Latreille, 1804) (type) - Sri Lanka
- Poecilotheria formosa Pocock, 1899 - India
- Poecilotheria hanumavilasumica Smith, 2004 - India, Sri Lanka
- Poecilotheria metallica Pocock, 1899 - India
- Poecilotheria miranda Pocock, 1900 - India
- Poecilotheria ornata Pocock, 1899 - Sri Lanka
- Poecilotheria rajaei Nanayakkara, Kirk, Dayananda, Ganehiarachchi, Vishvanath & Kusuminda, 2012 - Sri Lanka
- Poecilotheria regalis Pocock, 1899 - India
- Poecilotheria rufilata Pocock, 1899 - India
- Poecilotheria smithi Kirk, 1996 - Sri Lanka
- Poecilotheria srilankensis Nanayakkara, Ganehiarachi, Kusuminda, Vishvanath, Karunaratne & Kirk, 2020 - Sri Lanka
- Poecilotheria striata Pocock, 1895 - India
- Poecilotheria subfusca Pocock, 1895 - Sri Lanka
- Poecilotheria tigrinawesseli Smith, 2006 - India
- Poecilotheria vittata Pocock, 1895 - India, Sri Lanka

=== Proshapalopus ===
Proshapalopus Mello-Leitão, 1923

- Proshapalopus amazonicus Bertani, 2001 - Brazil
- Proshapalopus anomalus Mello-Leitão, 1923 (type) - Brazil
- Proshapalopus multicuspidatus (Mello-Leitão, 1929) - Brazil

=== Psalistops ===
Psalistops Simon, 1889

- Psalistops colombianus Mori & Bertani, 2020 - Colombia
- Psalistops melanopygius Simon, 1889 (type) - Venezuela

=== Psalmopoeus ===
Psalmopoeus

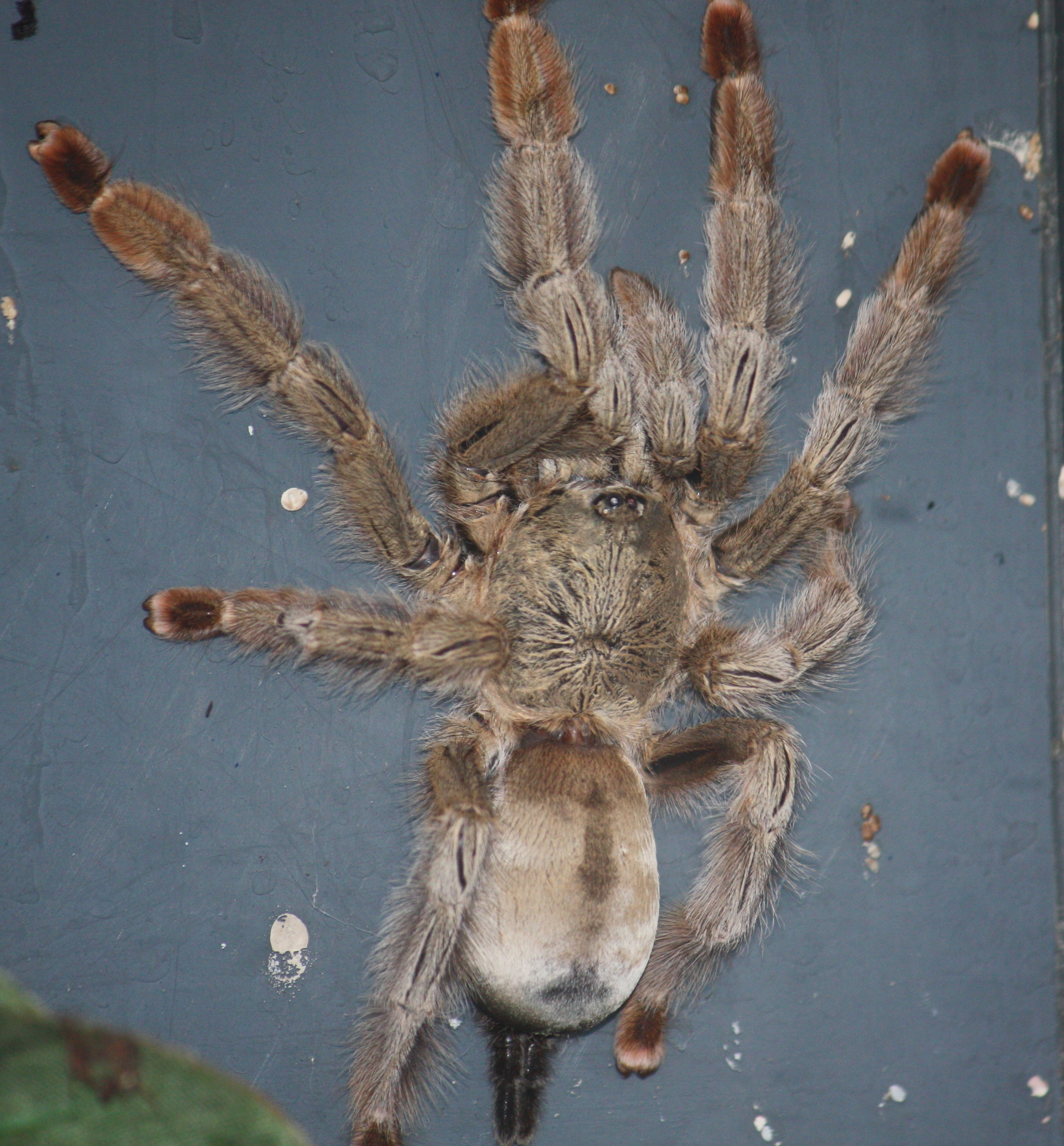
Psalmopoeus pulcher

Psalmopoeus Pocock, 1895

- Psalmopoeus cambridgei Pocock, 1895 (type) - Trinidad, possibly Malaysia
- Psalmopoeus ecclesiasticus Pocock, 1903 - Ecuador
- Psalmopoeus emeraldus Pocock, 1903 - Colombia
- Psalmopoeus irminia Saager, 1994 - Venezuela, Guyana, Brazil
- Psalmopoeus langenbucheri Schmidt, Bullmer & Thierer-Lutz, 2006 - Venezuela
- Psalmopoeus maya Witt, 1996 - Belize
- Psalmopoeus plantaris Pocock, 1903 - Colombia
- Psalmopoeus pulcher Petrunkevitch, 1925 - Panama
- Psalmopoeus reduncus (Karsch, 1880) - Belize to Panama
- Psalmopoeus victori Mendoza, 2014 - Mexico

=== Psednocnemis ===
Psednocnemis West, Nunn & Hogg, 2012

- Psednocnemis brachyramosa (West & Nunn, 2010) - Malaysia
- Psednocnemis davidgohi West, Nunn & Hogg, 2012 (type) - Malaysia
- Psednocnemis gnathospina (West & Nunn, 2010) - Malaysia
- Psednocnemis imbellis (Simon, 1891) - Borneo
- Psednocnemis jeremyhuffi (West & Nunn, 2010) - Malaysia

=== Pseudhapalopus ===
Pseudhapalopus

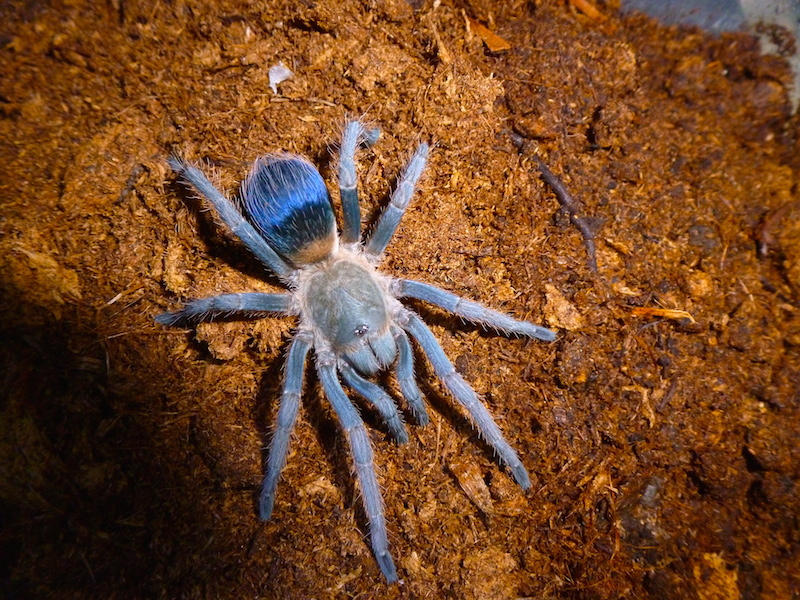
Pseudhapalopus sp.

Pseudhapalopus Strand, 1907

- Pseudhapalopus aculeatus Strand, 1907 (type) - Bolivia

=== Pseudoschizopelma ===
Pseudoschizopelma Smith, 1995

- Pseudoschizopelma macropus (Ausserer, 1875) (type) - Mexico

=== Pterinochilus ===
Pterinochilus

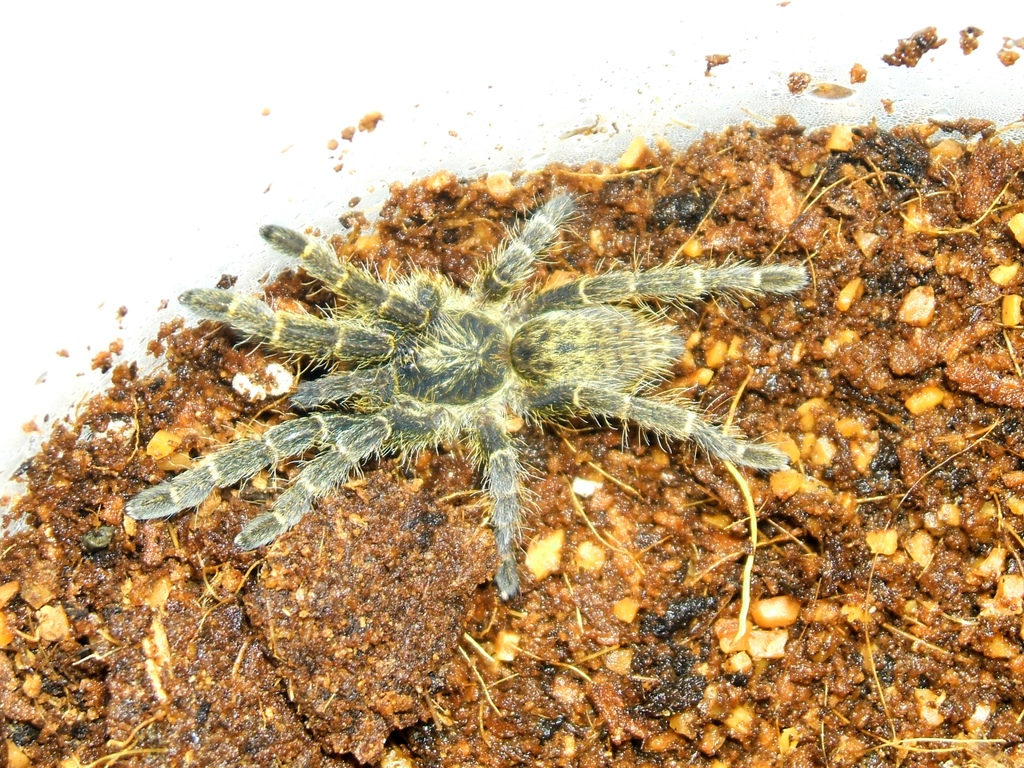
Kilimanjaro mustard baboon spider
(Pterinochilus chordatus)

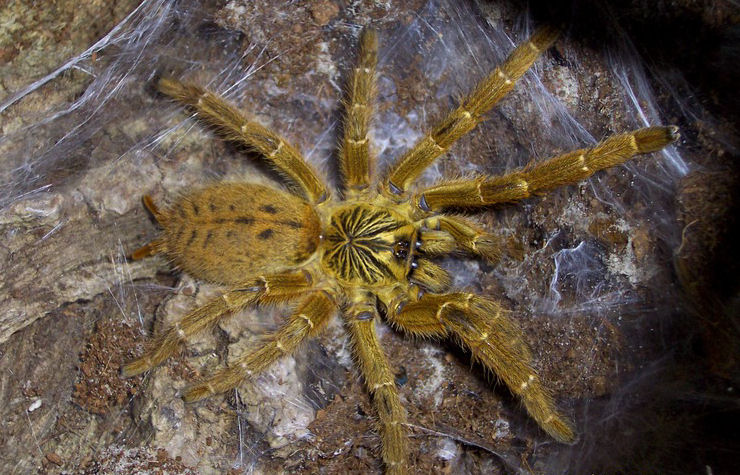
Pterinochilus murinus

Pterinochilus Pocock, 1897

- Pterinochilus alluaudi Berland, 1914 - Kenya
- Pterinochilus andrewsmithi Gallon, 2009 - Kenya
- Pterinochilus chordatus (Gerstäcker, 1873) - East Africa
- Pterinochilus cryptus Gallon, 2008 - Angola
- Pterinochilus lapalala Gallon & Engelbrecht, 2011 - South Africa
- Pterinochilus lugardi Pocock, 1900 - Southern, East Africa
- Pterinochilus murinus Pocock, 1897 - Angola, Central, East, Southern Africa
- Pterinochilus raygabrieli Gallon, 2009 - Kenya
- Pterinochilus simoni Berland, 1917 - Angola, Congo
- Pterinochilus vorax Pocock, 1897 (type) - Angola, Central, East Africa

=== Pterinopelma ===
Pterinopelma Pocock, 1901

- Pterinopelma felipeleitei Bertani & Leal, 2016 - Brazil
- Pterinopelma vitiosum (Keyserling, 1891) (type) - Brazil

== R ==
=== Reichlingia ===
Reichlingia Rudloff, 2001

- Reichlingia annae (Reichling, 1997) (type) - Belize

=== Reversopelma ===
Reversopelma Schmidt, 2001

- Reversopelma petersi Schmidt, 2001 (type) - Ecuador, Peru

== S ==
=== Sahydroaraneus ===
Sahydroaraneus Mirza & Sanap, 2014

- Sahydroaraneus collinus (Pocock, 1899) - India
- Sahydroaraneus hirsti Mirza & Sanap, 2014 (type) - India
- Sahydroaraneus raja (Gravely, 1915) - India
- Sahydroaraneus sebastiani Sunil Jose, 2017 - India

=== Sandinista ===
Sandinista Longhorn & Gabriel, 2019

- Sandinista lanceolatum (Simon, 1891) (type) - Nicaragua, Costa Rica

=== Schismatothele ===
Schismatothele Karsch, 1879

- Schismatothele benedettii Panzera, Perdomo & Pérez-Miles, 2011 - Brazil
- Schismatothele hacaritama Perafán, Valencia-Cuéllar & Guadanucci, 2019 - Colombia
- Schismatothele inflata (Simon, 1889) (type) - Venezuela
- Schismatothele kastoni (Caporiacco, 1955) - Venezuela
- Schismatothele lineata Karsch, 1879 - Venezuela
- Schismatothele modesta (Simon, 1889) - Colombia
- Schismatothele olsoni Guadanucci, Perafán & Valencia-Cuéllar, 2019 - Colombia, Venezuela
- Schismatothele opifex (Simon, 1889) - Venezuela
- Schismatothele weinmanni Guadanucci, Perafán & Valencia-Cuéllar, 2019 - Colombia

=== Schizopelma ===
Schizopelma F. O. Pickard-Cambridge, 1897

- Schizopelma bicarinatum F. O. Pickard-Cambridge, 1897 (type) - Mexico, Central America
- Schizopelma juxtantricola (Ortiz & Francke, 2015) - Mexico

=== Scopelobates ===
Scopelobates Simon, 1903

- Scopelobates sericeus Simon, 1903 (type) - Dominican Republic

=== Selenocosmia ===
Selenocosmia

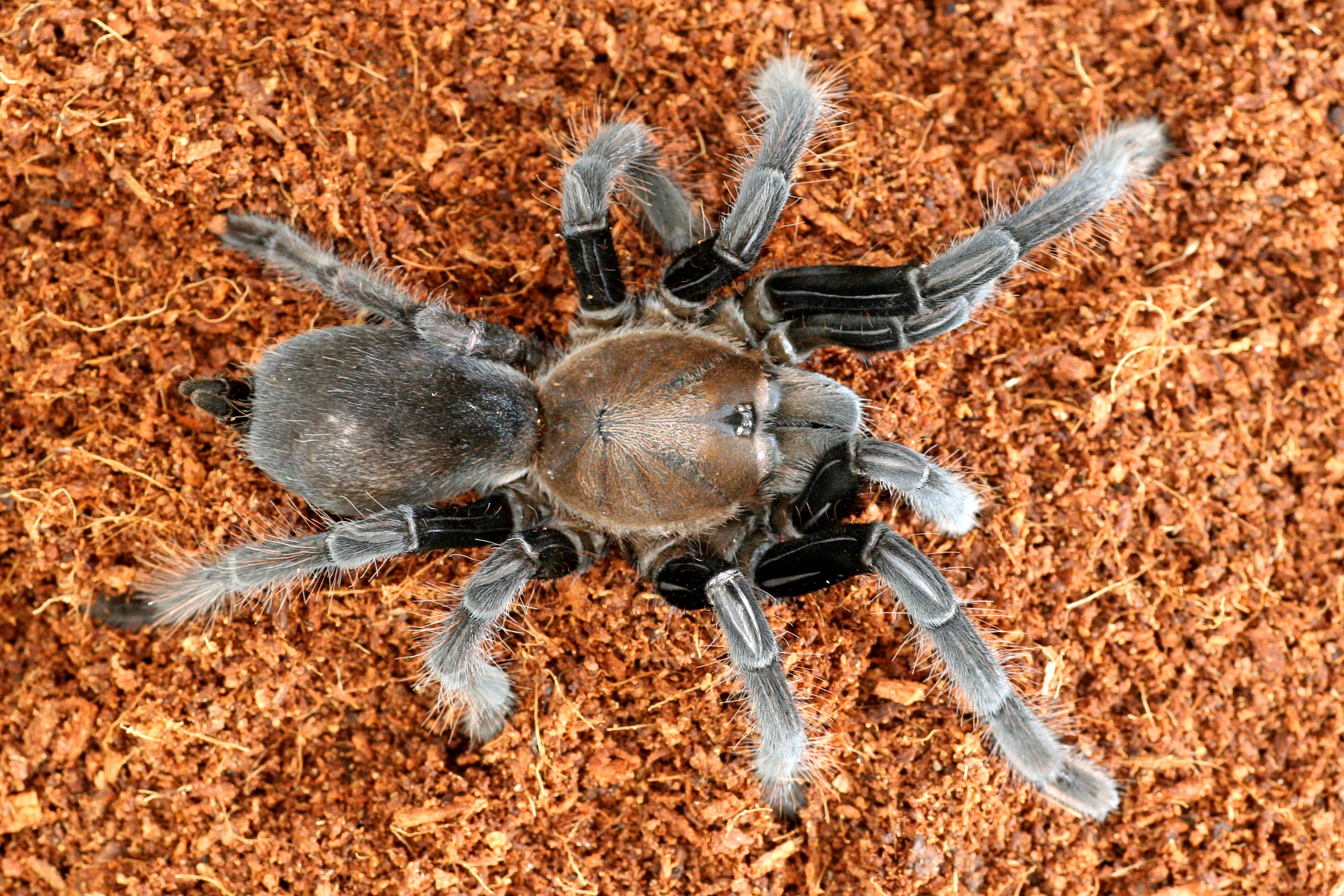
Selenocosmia barensteinerae

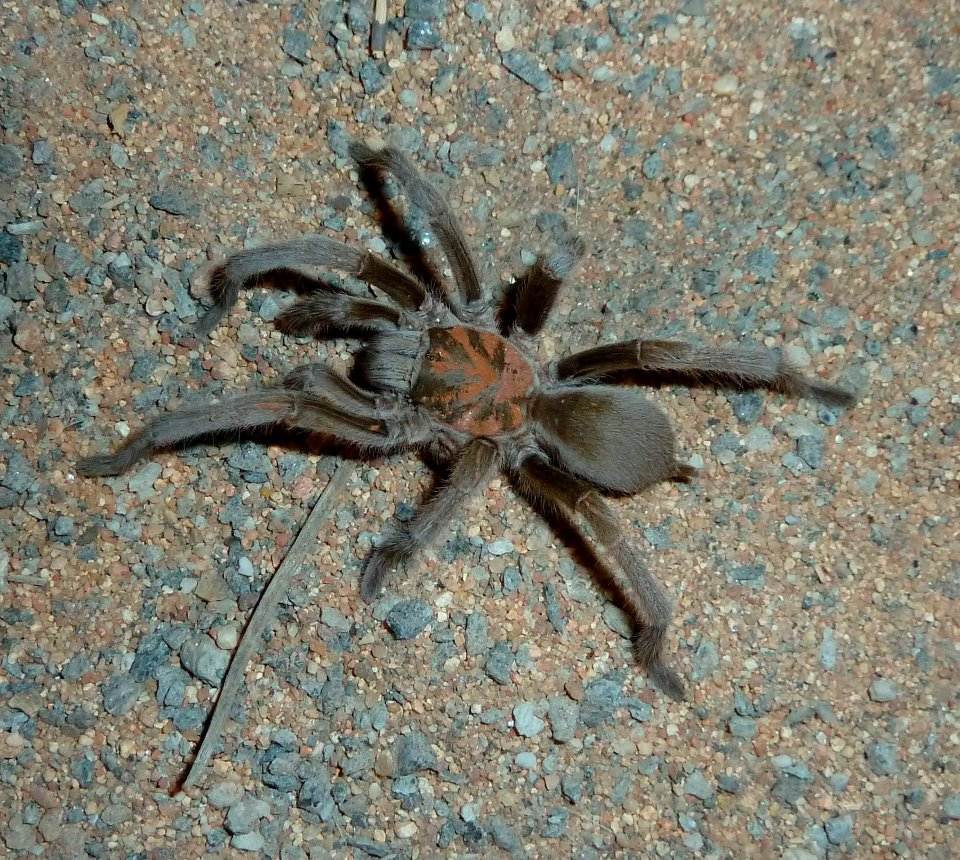
Barking spider
(Selenocosmia stirlingi)

Selenocosmia Ausserer, 1871

- Selenocosmia anubis Yu, S. Y. Zhang, F. Zhang, Li & Yang, 2021 - China
- Selenocosmia arndsti (Schmidt & von Wirth, 1991) - New Guinea
- Selenocosmia aruana Strand, 1911 - Indonesia (Aru Is.)
- Selenocosmia barensteinerae (Schmidt, Hettegger & Matthes, 2010) - Borneo
- Selenocosmia compta Kulczyński, 1911 - New Guinea
- Selenocosmia crassipes (L. Koch, 1874) - Australia (Queensland)
- Selenocosmia deliana Strand, 1913 - Indonesia (Sumatra)
- Selenocosmia effera (Simon, 1891) - Indonesia (Moluccas)
- Selenocosmia fuliginea (Thorell, 1895) - Myanmar
- Selenocosmia hasselti Simon, 1891 - Indonesia (Sumatra)
- Selenocosmia hirtipes Strand, 1913 - Indonesia (Moluccas), New Guinea
- Selenocosmia honesta Hirst, 1909 - New Guinea
- Selenocosmia insignis (Simon, 1890) - Indonesia (Sumatra)
- Selenocosmia javanensis (Walckenaer, 1837) (type) - Malaysia to Indonesia (Sulawesi)
  - Selenocosmia javanensis brachyplectra Kulczyński, 1908 - Indonesia (Java)
  - Selenocosmia javanensis dolichoplectra Kulczyński, 1908 - Indonesia (Java)
  - Selenocosmia javanensis fulva Kulczyński, 1908 - Indonesia (Java)
  - Selenocosmia javanensis sumatrana Thorell, 1890 - Indonesia (Sumatra)
- Selenocosmia jiafu Zhu & Zhang, 2008 - China, Laos
- Selenocosmia kovariki (Schmidt & Krause, 1995) - Vietnam
- Selenocosmia kulluensis Chamberlin, 1917 - India
- Selenocosmia lanceolata Hogg, 1914 - New Guinea
- Selenocosmia lanipes Ausserer, 1875 - Indonesia (Moluccas), New Guinea
- Selenocosmia longiembola Yu, S. Y. Zhang, F. Zhang, Li & Yang, 2021 - China
- Selenocosmia mittmannae (Barensteiner & Wehinger, 2005) - New Guinea
- Selenocosmia papuana Kulczyński, 1908 - New Guinea
- Selenocosmia peerboomi (Schmidt, 1999) - Philippines
- Selenocosmia pritami Dyal, 1935 - Pakistan
- Selenocosmia qiani Yu, S. Y. Zhang, F. Zhang, Li & Yang, 2021 - China
- Selenocosmia raciborskii Kulczyński, 1908 - Indonesia (Java)
- Selenocosmia samarae (Giltay, 1935) - Philippines
- Selenocosmia similis Kulczyński, 1911 - New Guinea
- Selenocosmia stirlingi Hogg, 1901 - Australia
- Selenocosmia strenua (Thorell, 1881) - New Guinea, Australia (Queensland)
- Selenocosmia strubelli Strand, 1913 - Indonesia (Java, Moluccas) or New Guinea
- Selenocosmia sutherlandi Gravely, 1935 - India
- Selenocosmia tahanensis Abraham, 1924 - Malaysia
- Selenocosmia valida (Thorell, 1881) - New Guinea
- Selenocosmia xinhuaensis Zhu & Zhang, 2008 - China
- Selenocosmia zhangzhengi Lin, 2022 - China

=== Selenogyrus ===
Selenogyrus Pocock, 1897

- Selenogyrus africanus (Simon, 1887) - Ivory Coast
- Selenogyrus aureus Pocock, 1897 - Sierra Leone
- Selenogyrus austini Smith, 1990 - Sierra Leone
- Selenogyrus caeruleus Pocock, 1897 (type) - Sierra Leone

=== Selenotholus ===
Selenotholus Hogg, 1902

- Selenotholus foelschei Hogg, 1902 (type) - Australia (Northern Territory)

=== Selenotypus ===
Selenotypus Pocock, 1895

- Selenotypus plumipes Pocock, 1895 (type) - Australia (Queensland)

=== Sericopelma ===
Sericopelma

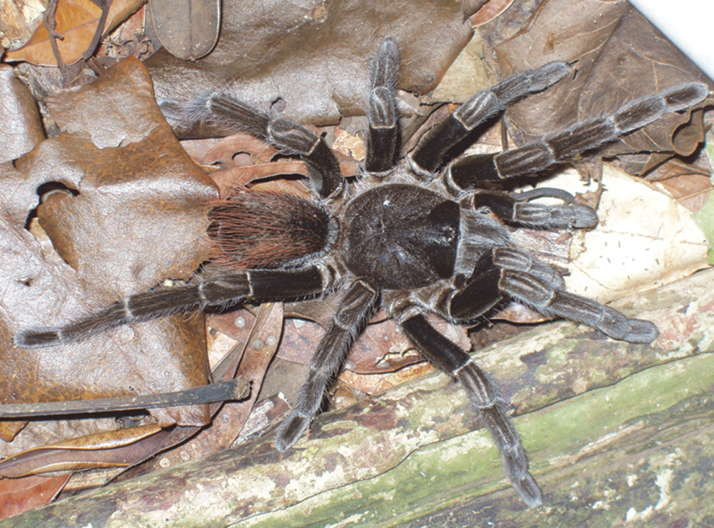
Sericopelma sp.

Sericopelma Ausserer, 1875

- Sericopelma angustum (Valerio, 1980) - Costa Rica
- Sericopelma commune F. O. Pickard-Cambridge, 1897 - Panama
- Sericopelma dota Valerio, 1980 - Costa Rica
- Sericopelma embrithes (Chamberlin & Ivie, 1936) - Panama
- Sericopelma fallax Mello-Leitão, 1923 - Brazil
- Sericopelma ferrugineum Valerio, 1980 - Costa Rica
- Sericopelma generala Valerio, 1980 - Costa Rica
- Sericopelma immensum Valerio, 1980 - Costa Rica
- Sericopelma melanotarsum Valerio, 1980 - Costa Rica
- Sericopelma panamanum (Karsch, 1880) - Panama
- Sericopelma panamense (Simon, 1891) - Mexico, Panama
- Sericopelma rubronitens Ausserer, 1875 (type) - Central America
- Sericopelma silvicola Valerio, 1980 - Costa Rica
- Sericopelma upala Valerio, 1980 - Costa Rica

=== Sickius ===
Sickius Soares & Camargo, 1948

- Sickius longibulbi Soares & Camargo, 1948 (type) - Brazil

=== Sphaerobothria ===
Sphaerobothria Karsch, 1879

- Sphaerobothria hoffmanni Karsch, 1879 (type) - Costa Rica, Panama

=== Spinosatibiapalpus ===
Spinosatibiapalpus Gabriel & Sherwood, 2020

- Spinosatibiapalpus bora Sherwood & Gabriel, 2021 - Peru
- Spinosatibiapalpus cambrai Gabriel & Sherwood, 2022 - Panama
- Spinosatibiapalpus spinulopalpus (Schmidt & Weinmann, 1997) - Colombia
- Spinosatibiapalpus tansleyi Gabriel & Sherwood, 2020 - Trinidad
- Spinosatibiapalpus trinitatis (Pocock, 1903) (type) - Trinidad

=== Stichoplastoris ===
Stichoplastoris Rudloff, 1997

- Stichoplastoris angustatus (Kraus, 1955) - El Salvador
- Stichoplastoris asterix (Valerio, 1980) - Costa Rica
- Stichoplastoris denticulatus (Valerio, 1980) - Costa Rica
- Stichoplastoris elusinus (Valerio, 1980) - Costa Rica
- Stichoplastoris longistylus (Kraus, 1955) - El Salvador
- Stichoplastoris obelix (Valerio, 1980) (type) - Costa Rica
- Stichoplastoris schusterae (Kraus, 1955) - El Salvador
- Stichoplastoris stylipus (Valerio, 1982) - Costa Rica, Panama

=== Stromatopelma ===
Stromatopelma Karsch, 1881

- Stromatopelma batesi (Pocock, 1902) - Cameroon, Congo
- Stromatopelma calceatum (Fabricius, 1793) (type) - West Africa
  - Stromatopelma calceatum griseipes (Pocock, 1897) - West Africa
- Stromatopelma fumigatum (Pocock, 1900) - Equatorial Guinea (Mbini)
- Stromatopelma pachypoda (Strand, 1908) - Cameroon
- Stromatopelma satanas (Berland, 1917) - Gabon, Congo

== T ==
=== Taksinus ===
Taksinus Songsangchote, Sippawat, Khaikaew & Chomphuphuang, 2022

- Taksinus bambus Songsangchote, Sippawat, Khaikaew & Chomphuphuang, 2022 (type) - Thailand

=== Tapinauchenius ===
Tapinauchenius

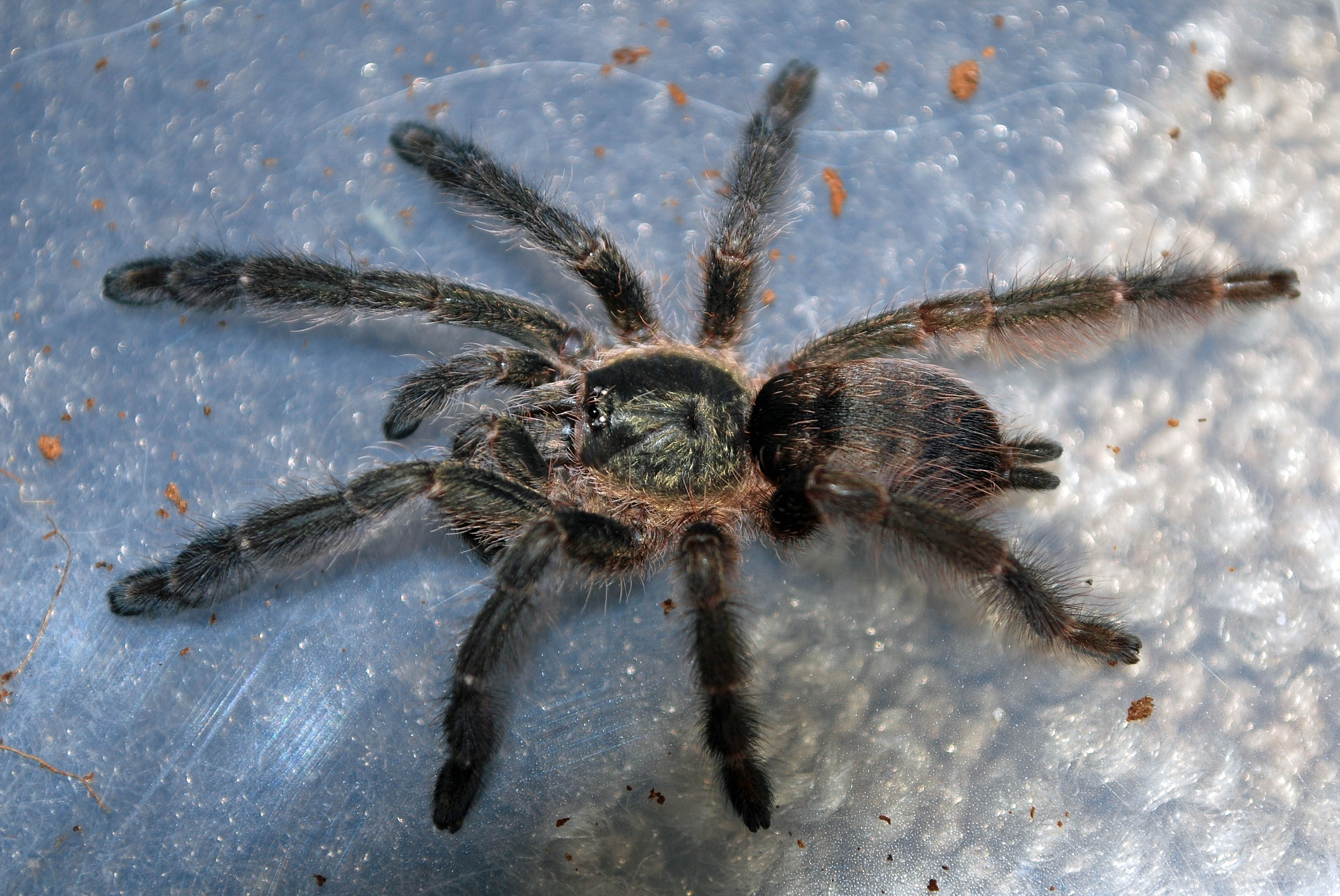
Tapinauchenius cupreus

Tapinauchenius Ausserer, 1871

- Tapinauchenius brunneus Schmidt, 1995 - Brazil
- Tapinauchenius cupreus Schmidt & Bauer, 1996 - Ecuador
- Tapinauchenius gretae Cifuentes & Bertani, 2022 - Brazil
- Tapinauchenius herrerai Gabriel & Sherwood, 2022 - Panama
- Tapinauchenius latipes L. Koch, 1875 - Venezuela
- Tapinauchenius plumipes (C. L. Koch, 1842) (type) - Suriname
- Tapinauchenius polybotes Hüsser, 2018 - Lesser Antilles (St. Lucia)
- Tapinauchenius rasti Hüsser, 2018 - Lesser Antilles (St. Vincent and the Grenadines)
- Tapinauchenius sanctivincenti (Walckenaer, 1837) - St. Vincent
- Tapinauchenius violaceus (Mello-Leitão, 1930) - French Guiana, Brazil

=== Theraphosa ===
Theraphosa

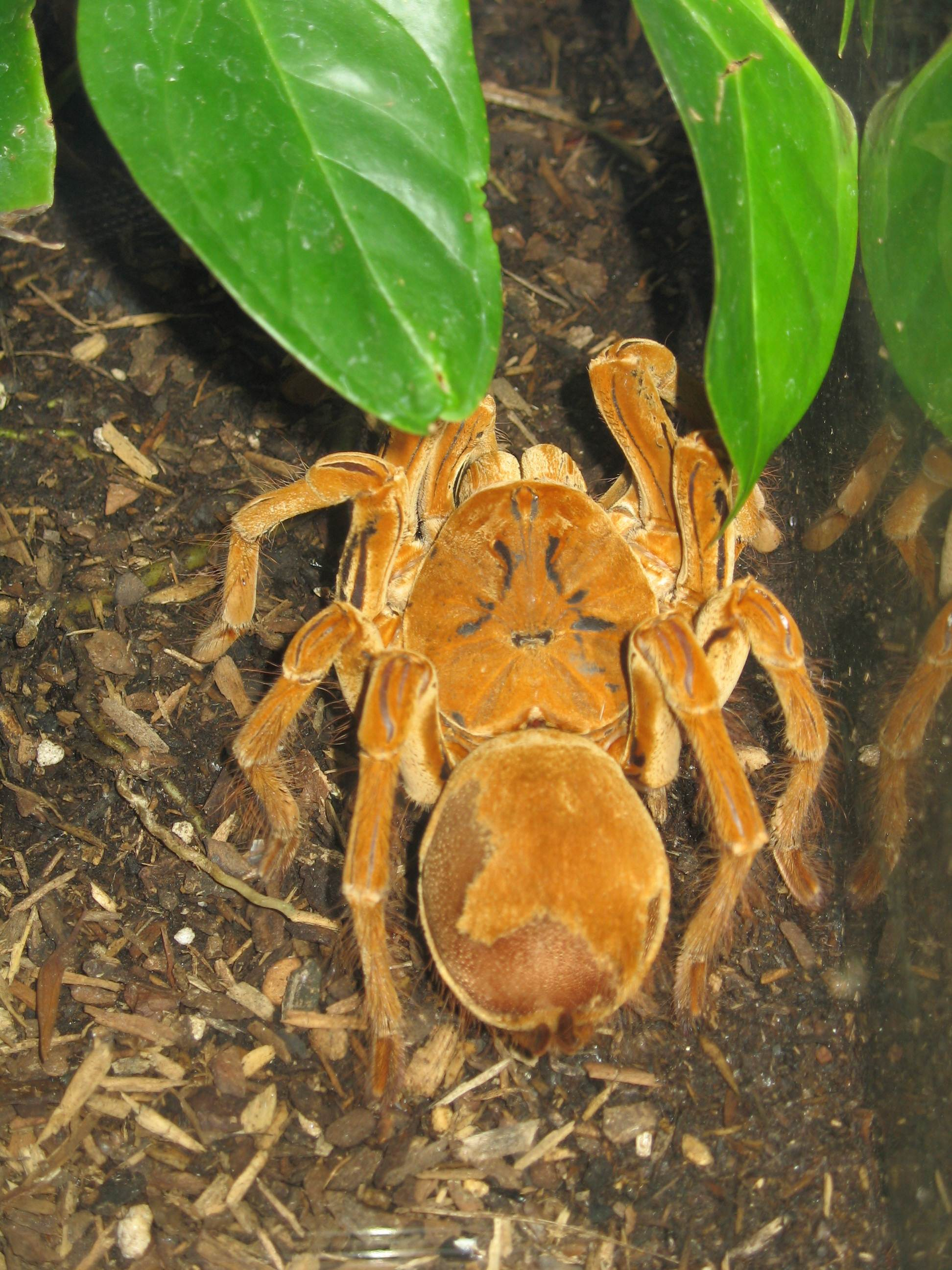
Goliath birdeater
(Theraphosa blondi)

Theraphosa Thorell, 1870

- Theraphosa apophysis (Tinter, 1991) - Colombia, Venezuela, Brazil
- Theraphosa blondi (Latreille, 1804) (type) - Venezuela, Brazil, Guyana
- Theraphosa stirmi Rudloff & Weinmann, 2010 - Guyana, Brazil

=== Thrigmopoeus ===
Thrigmopoeus Pocock, 1899

- Thrigmopoeus insignis Pocock, 1899 (type) - India
- Thrigmopoeus truculentus Pocock, 1899 - India

=== Thrixopelma ===
Thrixopelma

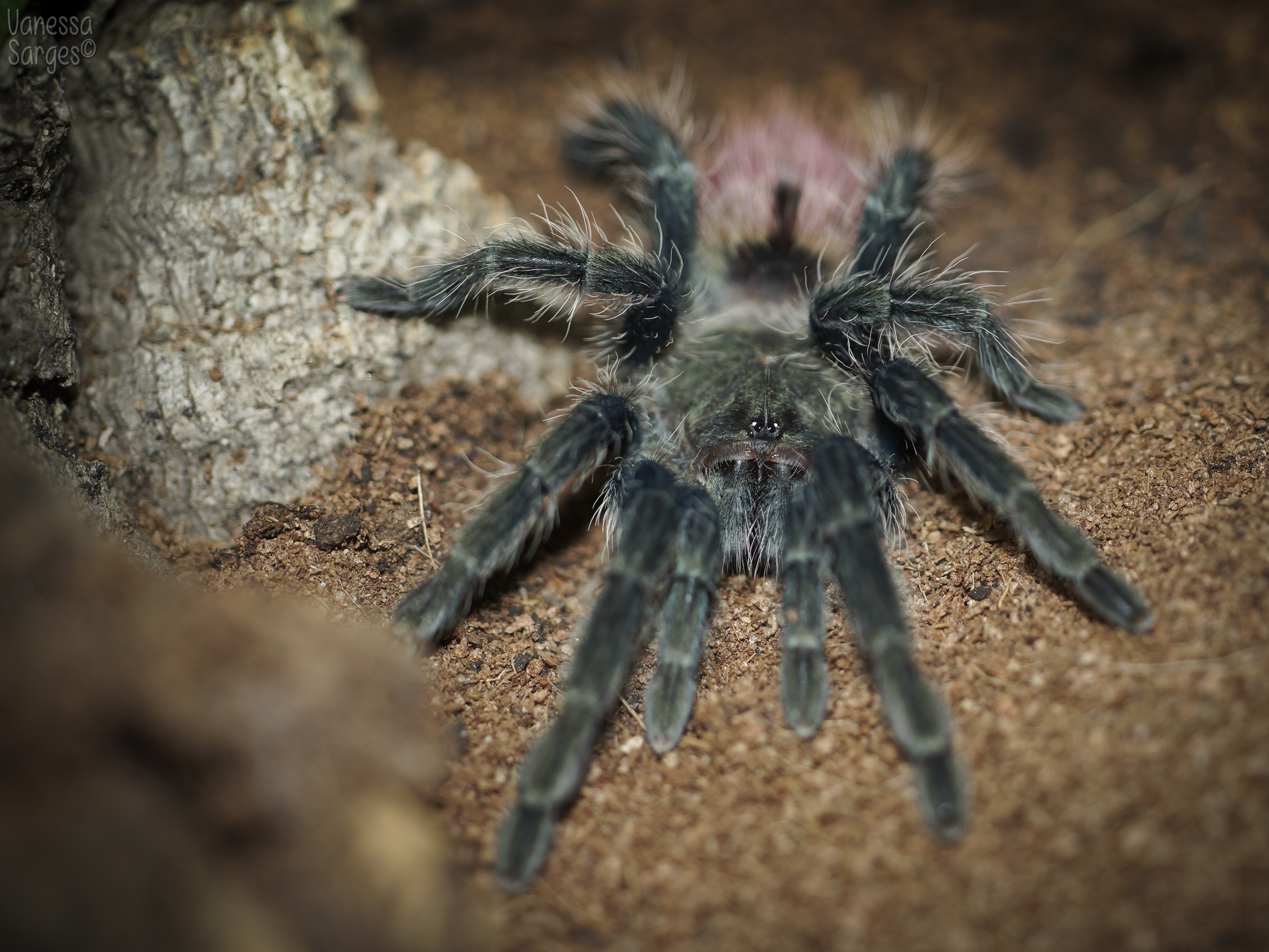
Thrixopelma ockerti, juvenile female

Thrixopelma Schmidt, 1994

- Thrixopelma aymara (Chamberlin, 1916) - Peru
- Thrixopelma cyaneolum Schmidt, Friebolin & Friebolin, 2005 - Peru
- Thrixopelma lagunas Schmidt & Rudloff, 2010 - Peru
- Thrixopelma longicolli (Schmidt, 2003) - Ecuador, Peru
- Thrixopelma nadineae Sherwood & Gabriel, 2022 - Ecuador
- Thrixopelma ockerti Schmidt, 1994 (type) - Peru
- Thrixopelma peruvianum (Schmidt, 2007) - Peru
- Thrixopelma pruriens Schmidt, 1998 - Chile

=== Tliltocatl ===
Tliltocatl

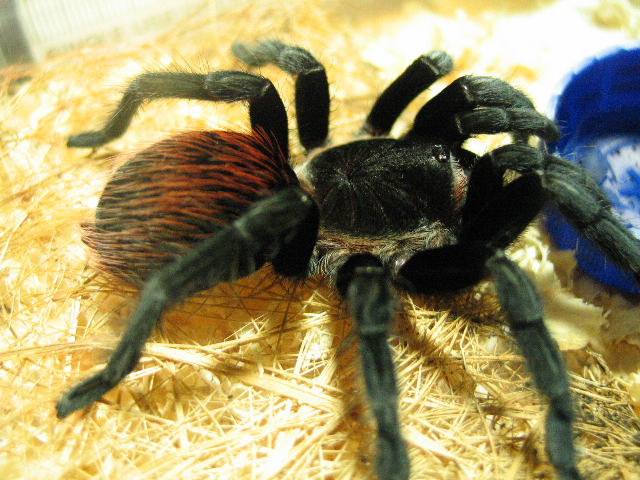
Mexican red rump
(Tliltocatl vagans)

Tliltocatl Jorge & Oscar, 2019

- Tliltocatl albopilosum Valerio, 1980 - Costa Rica
- Tliltocatl epicureanum (Chamberlin, 1925) - Mexico
- Tliltocatl kahlenbergi Rudloff, 2008 - Mexico
- Tliltocatl sabulosum (F. O. Pickard-Cambridge, 1897) - Guatemala
- Tliltocatl schroederi Rudloff, 2003 - Mexico
- Tliltocatl vagans (Ausserer, 1875) - Mexico, Central America
- Tliltocatl verdezi Schmidt, 2003 - Mexico

=== Tmesiphantes ===
Tmesiphantes Simon, 1892

- Tmesiphantes amadoi Yamamoto, Lucas, Guadanucci & Indicatti, 2007 - Brazil
- Tmesiphantes amazonicus Fabiano-da-Silva, Guadanucci & DaSilva, 2019 - Brazil
- Tmesiphantes aridai Gonzalez-Filho, Brescovit & Lucas, 2014 - Brazil
- Tmesiphantes bethaniae Yamamoto, Lucas, Guadanucci & Indicatti, 2007 - Brazil
- Tmesiphantes brescoviti (Indicatti, Lucas, Guadanucci & Yamamoto, 2008) - Brazil
- Tmesiphantes buecherli (Indicatti, Lucas, Guadanucci & Yamamoto, 2008) - Brazil
- Tmesiphantes caymmii Yamamoto, Lucas, Guadanucci & Indicatti, 2007 - Brazil
- Tmesiphantes crassifemur (Gerschman & Schiapelli, 1960) - Argentina
- Tmesiphantes guayarus Fabiano-da-Silva, Guadanucci & DaSilva, 2019 - Brazil
- Tmesiphantes hypogeus Bertani, Bichuette & Pedroso, 2013 - Brazil
- Tmesiphantes intiyaykuy Nicoletta, Ferretti, Chaparro & West, 2022 - Peru
- Tmesiphantes janeira (Keyserling, 1891) - Peru
- Tmesiphantes mirim Fabiano-da-Silva, Guadanucci & DaSilva, 2015 - Brazil
- Tmesiphantes mutquina (Perafán & Pérez-Miles, 2014) - Argentina
- Tmesiphantes nordestinus Fabiano-da-Silva, Guadanucci & DaSilva, 2019 - Brazil
- Tmesiphantes nubilus Simon, 1892 (type) - Brazil
- Tmesiphantes obesus (Simon, 1892) - Brazil
- Tmesiphantes perp Guadanucci & Silva, 2012 - Brazil
- Tmesiphantes raulseixasi Fabiano-da-Silva, Guadanucci & DaSilva, 2019 - Brazil
- Tmesiphantes riopretano Guadanucci & Silva, 2012 - Brazil
- Tmesiphantes uru (Perafán & Pérez-Miles, 2014) - Argentina
- Tmesiphantes yupanqui (Perafán & Pérez-Miles, 2014) - Argentina

=== Trichognathella ===
Trichognathella Gallon, 2004

- Trichognathella schoenlandi (Pocock, 1900) (type) - South Africa

=== Trichopelma ===
Trichopelma Simon, 1888

- Trichopelma affine (Simon, 1892) - St. Vincent
- Trichopelma banksia Özdikmen & Demir, 2012 - Cuba
- Trichopelma bimini Mori & Bertani, 2020 - Bahamas
- Trichopelma coenobita (Simon, 1889) - Venezuela
- Trichopelma cubanum (Simon, 1903) - Cuba
- Trichopelma fulvum (Bryant, 1948) - Haiti
- Trichopelma gabrieli Mori & Bertani, 2020 - Dominican Republic
- Trichopelma goloboffi Mori & Bertani, 2020 - Cuba
- Trichopelma huffi Mori & Bertani, 2020 - Dominican Republic
- Trichopelma illetabile Simon, 1888 - Brazil
- Trichopelma insulanum (Petrunkevitch, 1926) - St. Thomas
- Trichopelma juventud Mori & Bertani, 2020 - Cuba
- Trichopelma laselva Valerio, 1986 - Costa Rica
- Trichopelma laurae Mori & Bertani, 2020 - Cuba
- Trichopelma loui Mori & Bertani, 2020 - Jamaica
- Trichopelma maculatum (Banks, 1906) - Bahama Is.
- Trichopelma nitidum Simon, 1888 (type) - Hispaniola
- Trichopelma platnicki Mori & Bertani, 2020 - Jamaica
- Trichopelma steini (Simon, 1889) - Venezuela
- Trichopelma tostoi Mori & Bertani, 2020 - Dominican Republic
- Trichopelma venadense (Valerio, 1986) - Costa Rica
- Trichopelma zebra (Petrunkevitch, 1925) - Panama

=== Typhochlaena ===
Typhochlaena

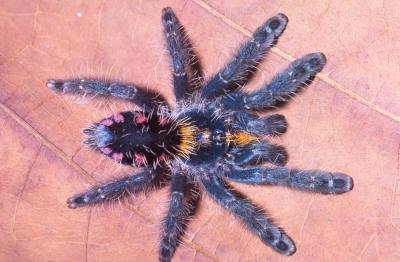
Typhochlaena costae

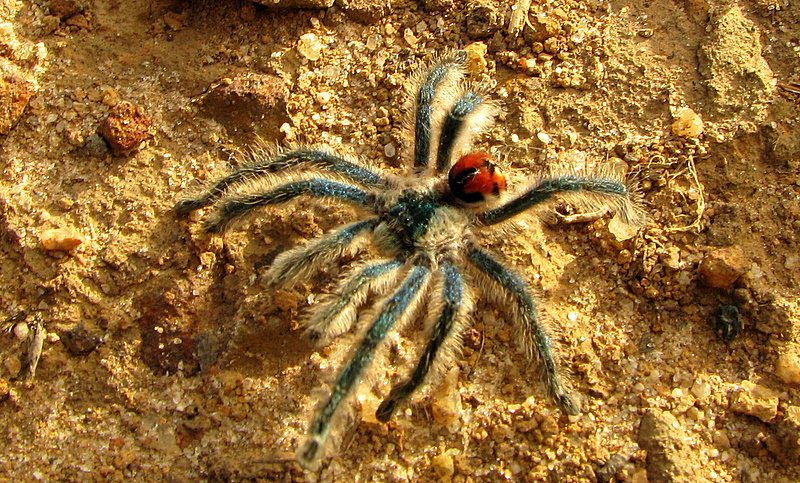
Typhochlaena seladonia

Typhochlaena C. L. Koch, 1850

- Typhochlaena amma Bertani, 2012 - Brazil
- Typhochlaena costae Bertani, 2012 - Brazil
- Typhochlaena curumim Bertani, 2012 - Brazil
- Typhochlaena paschoali Bertani, 2012 - Brazil
- Typhochlaena seladonia (C. L. Koch, 1841) (type) - Brazil

== U ==
=== Umbyquyra ===
Umbyquyra Gargiulo, Brescovit & Lucas, 2018

- Umbyquyra acuminata (Schmidt & Tesmoingt, 2005) - Bolivia, Brazil
- Umbyquyra araguaia Gargiulo, Brescovit & Lucas, 2018 - Brazil
- Umbyquyra belterra Gargiulo, Brescovit & Lucas, 2018 - Brazil
- Umbyquyra caxiuana Gargiulo, Brescovit & Lucas, 2018 - Brazil
- Umbyquyra cuiaba Gargiulo, Brescovit & Lucas, 2018 - Brazil
- Umbyquyra gurleyi Sherwood & Gabriel, 2020 - Brazil
- Umbyquyra palmarum (Schiapelli & Gerschman, 1945) - Brazil
- Umbyquyra paranaiba Gargiulo, Brescovit & Lucas, 2018 (type) - Brazil
- Umbyquyra sapezal Gargiulo, Brescovit & Lucas, 2018 - Brazil
- Umbyquyra schmidti (Rudloff, 1996) - Brazil
- Umbyquyra tapajos Gargiulo, Brescovit & Lucas, 2018 - Brazil
- Umbyquyra tucurui Gargiulo, Brescovit & Lucas, 2018 - Brazil

== V ==
=== Vitalius ===
Vitalius

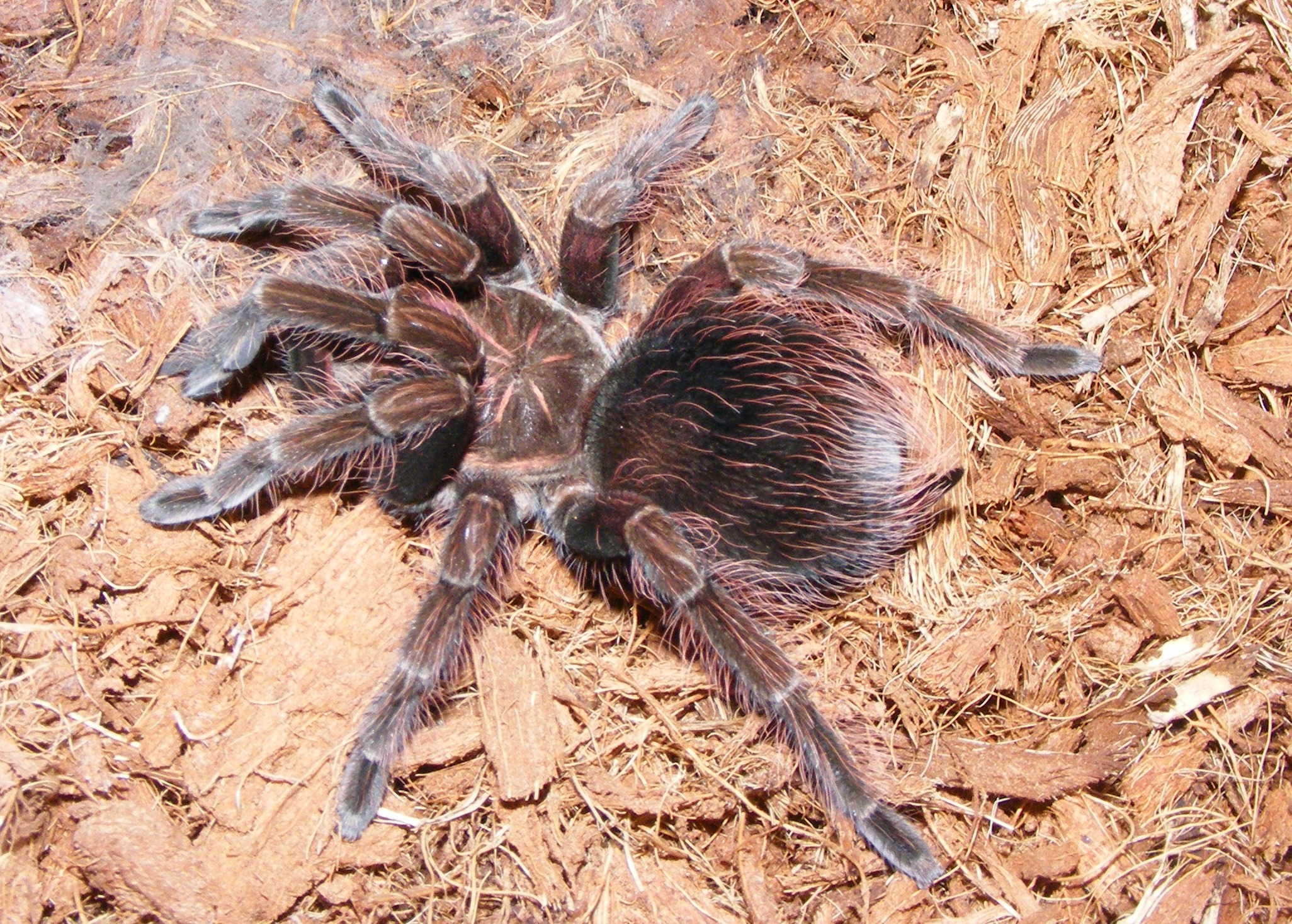
Vitalius wacketi

Vitalius Lucas, Silva & Bertani, 1993

- Vitalius buecherli Bertani, 2001 - Brazil
- Vitalius dubius (Mello-Leitão, 1923) - Brazil
- Vitalius longisternalis Bertani, 2001 - Brazil, Argentina
- Vitalius lucasae Bertani, 2001 - Brazil
- Vitalius nondescriptus (Mello-Leitão, 1926) - Brazil
- Vitalius paranaensis Bertani, 2001 - Brazil, Argentina
- Vitalius roseus (Mello-Leitão, 1923) - Brazil, Argentina
- Vitalius sorocabae (Mello-Leitão, 1923) (type) - Brazil
- Vitalius vellutinus (Mello-Leitão, 1923) - Brazil
- Vitalius wacketi (Mello-Leitão, 1923) - Brazil

== X ==
=== Xenesthis ===
Xenesthis

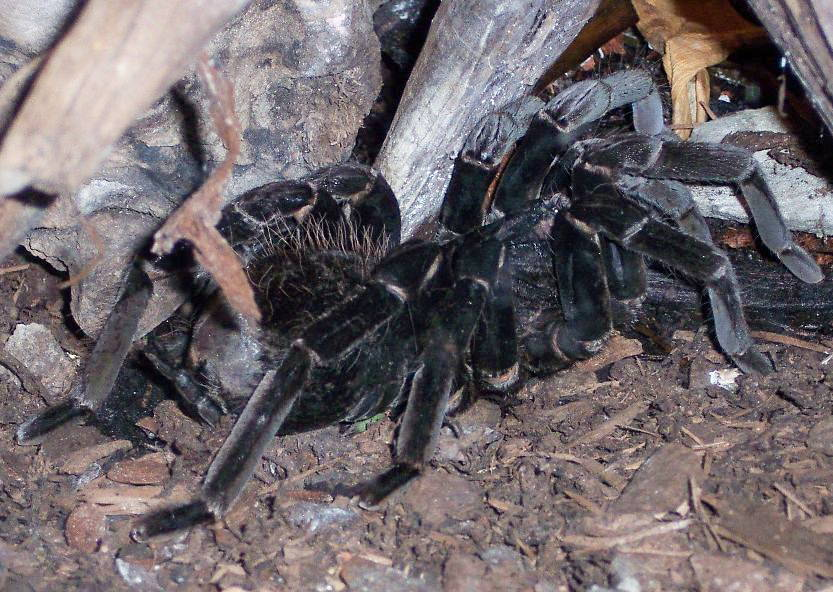
Colombian lesserblack tarantula
(Xenesthis immanis)

Xenesthis Simon, 1891

- Xenesthis colombiana Simon, 1891 (type) - Colombia
- Xenesthis immanis (Ausserer, 1875) - Panama to Venezuela
- Xenesthis intermedia Schiapelli & Gerschman, 1945 - Venezuela
- Xenesthis monstrosa Pocock, 1903 - Colombia

== Y ==
=== Yanomamius ===
Yanomamius Bertani & Almeida, 2021

- Yanomamius franciscoi Bertani & Almeida, 2021 (type) - Brazil
- Yanomamius neblina Bertani & Almeida, 2021 - Brazil
- Yanomamius raonii Bertani & Almeida, 2021 - Brazil
- Yanomamius waikoshiemi (Bertani & Araújo, 2006) - Venezuela

=== Ybyrapora ===
Ybyrapora

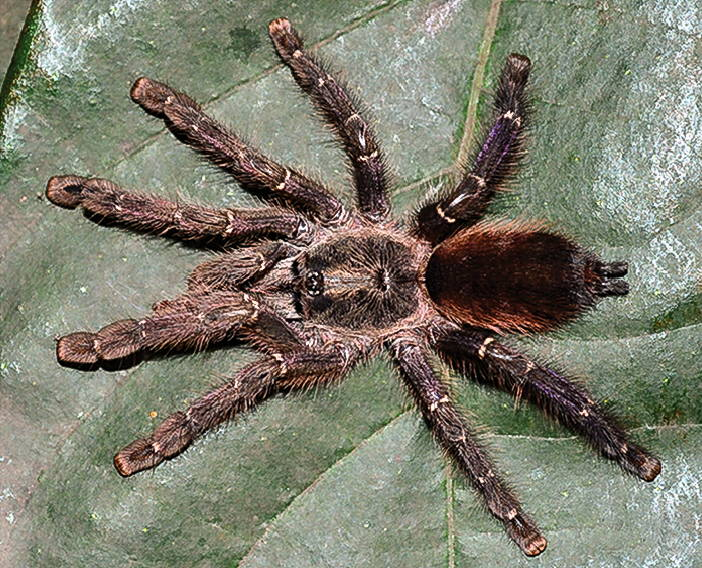
Ybyrapora sooretama, female

Ybyrapora Fukushima & Bertani, 2017

- Ybyrapora diversipes (C. L. Koch, 1842) - Brazil
- Ybyrapora gamba (Bertani & Fukushima, 2009) - Brazil
- Ybyrapora sooretama (Bertani & Fukushima, 2009) (type) - Brazil
