= Spinosatibiapalpus =

Scientific classification
- Kingdom: Animalia
- Phylum: Arthropoda
- Subphylum: Chelicerata
- Class: Arachnida
- Order: Araneae
- Infraorder: Mygalomorphae
- Family: Theraphosidae
- Genus: Spinosatibiapalpus; Gabriel & Sherwood, 2020

Type species
- Metriopelma trinitatis (Pocock, 1903)

Species
- 5, see text

Genus of tarantulas

Spinosatibiapalpus is a genus of tarantulas erected by Gabriel and Sherwood in 2020 for a newly discovered species and two other previously described species bearing a unique palpal bulb morphology. The name is a reference to the spines found on the fourth section of the pedipalp in adult males. This distinctive feature was also found in Pseudhapalopus species, but because it is never mentioned in the original description of that genus, Gabriel and Sherwood called into question the validity of Pseudohapalopus, and moved all its species except P. aculeatus, known only from a single male found in Bolivia in 1907. It is impossible to place P. aculeatus because the holotype was destroyed when the museum housing it was bombed during World War II, and it has been declared as nomen dubium.

== Species ==
As of July 2022 it contains 5 species:

- Spinosatibiapalpus bora Sherwood & Gabriel, 2021 - Peru
- Spinosatibiapalpus cambrai Gabriel & Sherwood, 2022 - Panama
- Spinosatibiapalpus spinulopalpus (Schmidt & Weinmann, 1997) - Colombia
- Spinosatibiapalpus tansleyi Gabriel & Sherwood, 2020 - Trinidad
- Spinosatibiapalpus trinitatis (Pocock, 1903) (type) - Trinidad

== See also ==
- Pseudhapalopus
- Hapalopus
