= Sickius =

Scientific classification
- Kingdom: Animalia
- Phylum: Arthropoda
- Subphylum: Chelicerata
- Class: Arachnida
- Order: Araneae
- Infraorder: Mygalomorphae
- Family: Theraphosidae
- Genus: Sickius; Soares & Camargo, 1948
- Species: S. longibulbi

Binomial name
- Sickius longibulbi Soares & Camargo, 1948

Synonyms
- Hapalotremus longibulbi (Raven, 1948)

Genus of spiders

Sickius is a genus of tarantulas. It has a single species, Sickius longibulbi. It is endemic to Brazil.

== Taxonomy ==
The species S. longibulbi was described in 1948 by Benedict A. M. Soares and H.F. de A. Camargo. However, Robert Raven put it in the genus Hapalotremus, on account of a similar double-branched tibial spur, though the holotype was missing at the time. It was restored to the genus Sickius in 2002 by Rogério Bertani, who claimed it lacked urticating hair and any keels on the embolus therefore it was impossible for the genus to be a member of the Theraphosinae.

In 2015 Josè Guadanucci and Dirk Weinmann moved this genus to the Schismatothelinae subfamily.

== Characteristic features ==
The main characteristic is the absence of spermathecae in the female spider. This is found in very few spiders, none of which are mygalomorphid. The male is characterized by the shape of the embolus; which is long and has a small hook at the end.
