= Cardiopelma =

Scientific classification
- Kingdom: Animalia
- Phylum: Arthropoda
- Subphylum: Chelicerata
- Class: Arachnida
- Order: Araneae
- Infraorder: Mygalomorphae
- Family: Theraphosidae
- Genus: Cardiopelma; Vol, 1999
- Species: C. mascatum

Binomial name
- Cardiopelma mascatum Vol, 1999

Genus of spiders

Cardiopelma is a genus of spiders in the family Theraphosidae. It was first described in 1999 by Vol. As of 2017, it contains only one species, Cardiopelma mascatum, known only from Mexico, in the state of Oaxaca.

== Description ==
Cardiopelma mascatum also known as the Orange Flame Rump Tarantula, is a tarantula which females live up to 16 years, while males only up to 6. Their carapace is a copper-like orange color, with a black triangle covering the eyes. The opisthosoma is black with a heart-shaped copper-colored urticating patch in the center, whereas the bottom of the opisthosoma is orange. Their legs are the same color as the carapace, with the exception of the femur which is black.

== Habitat ==
They have been found in the south eastern mountains and the borders of Oaxaca City, it is home to a tropical savanna climate. It has average temperatures 20 °C, and average yearly rainfall of 850mm. It is home to animals such as the Tlacuaches, Red-Bellied Squirrels, Coatis or Rock Doves.

== Behavior ==
They are New World terrestrial tarantulas, as such they do have urticating hairs. They are a bit skittish in nature, and will usually flee to their hide if bothered. They also are able to throw urticating hairs, but these are rare. Bites of this species are extremely rare, though their bites aren't medically significant.
