= Cyrtogrammomma =

Scientific classification
- Kingdom: Animalia
- Phylum: Arthropoda
- Subphylum: Chelicerata
- Class: Arachnida
- Order: Araneae
- Infraorder: Mygalomorphae
- Family: Theraphosidae
- Genus: Cyrtogrammomma; Pocock, 1895
- Species: C. monticola

Binomial name
- Cyrtogrammomma monticola Pocock, 1895

Genus of spiders

Cyrtogrammomma is a monotypic genus of South American brushed trapdoor spiders containing the single species, Cyrtogrammomma monticola. It was first described by Reginald Innes Pocock in 1895, and has only been found in Guyana.
