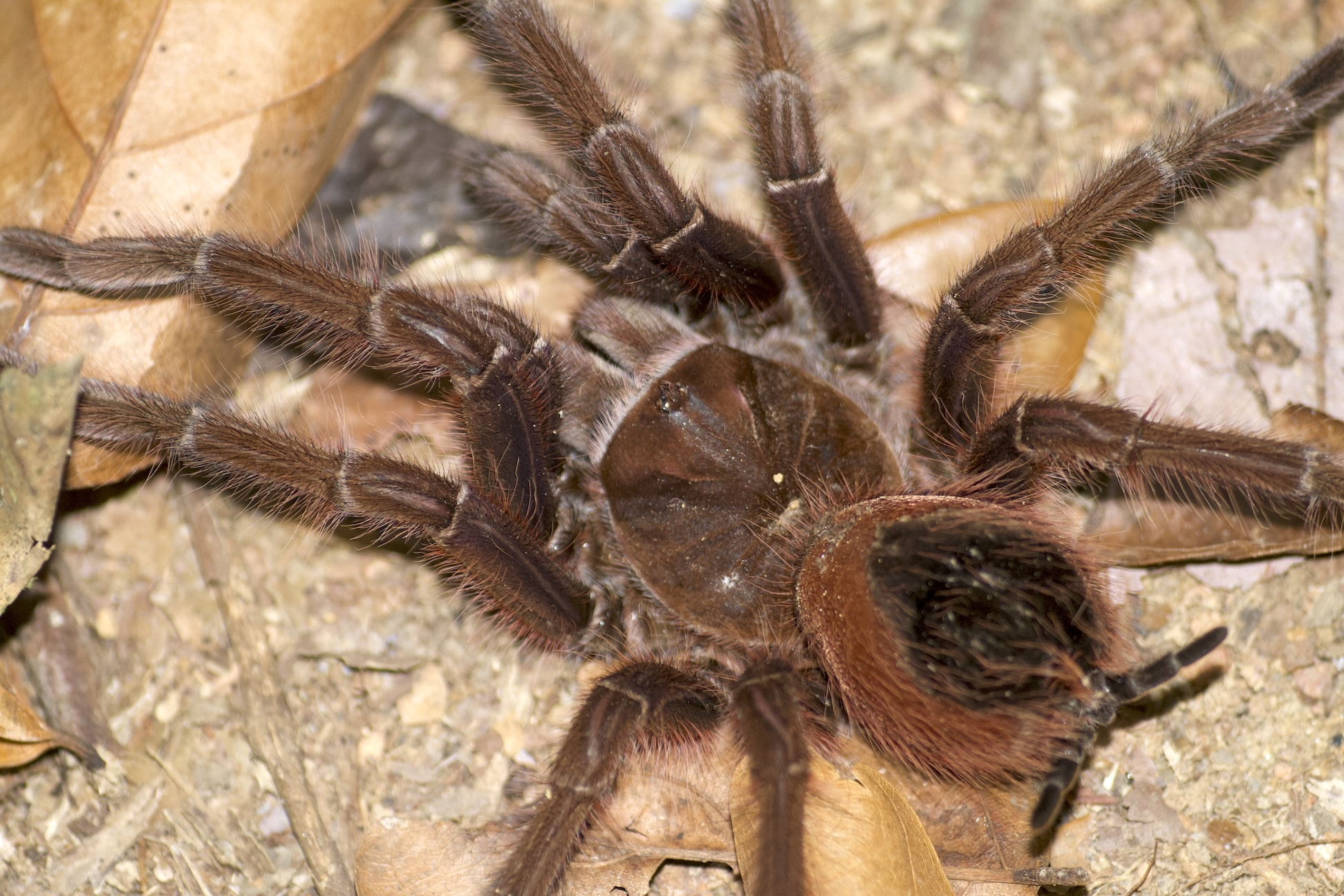

Scientific classification
- Kingdom: Animalia
- Phylum: Arthropoda
- Subphylum: Chelicerata
- Class: Arachnida
- Order: Araneae
- Infraorder: Mygalomorphae
- Family: Theraphosidae
- Genus: Theraphosa
- Species: T. apophysis

Binomial name
- Theraphosa apophysis (Tinter, 1991)

Synonyms
- Pseudotheraphosa apophysis Tinter, 1991

= Theraphosa apophysis =

Pinkfoot goliath

Species of spider

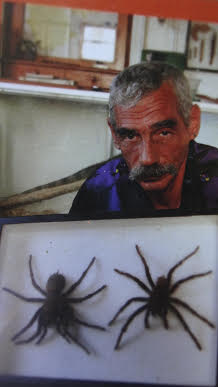
Charles J. Seiderman, discoverer of Theraphosa apophysis -1990

Theraphosa apophysis is a species of spider in the family Theraphosidae, found in Venezuela, Colombia and Brazil.

== Description ==
Theraphosa apophysis generally resembles Theraphosa blondi, and reaches a similar size. Immature T. apophysis spiders have pink shading at the end of each leg, which gradually fades with each moult. T. apophysis has an additional stridulating organ on the coxa of the second leg and thinner femora than T. blondi. Males of the species have tibial apophyses (projections) – hence the species name. The base colouration of both sexes is coffee brown; the legs and opisthosoma have long scattered orange-brown hairs, with long orange hair on the femora. Mature males have a metallic sheen, described as "wine red" in colour, on the cephalothorax, the dorsal surface of the chelicerae, the pedipalps, and the coxa, trochanter and femur of the legs, as well as the patella of the first leg.

The female holotype specimen had a total body length of 87 mm (3.4 in), with the longest leg (the fourth) being 96 mm (3.8 in) long. The male specimen had a somewhat smaller body, with a total length of 80 mm (3.1 in), and slightly longer legs, the fourth being just under 100 mm (3.9 in) long.

== Taxonomy ==
The species was first described by Andreas Tinter in 1991, as Pseudotheraphosa apophysis. Tinter purchased an individual sold under the name "Pamphobeteus exsul", which he determined was falsely identified due to the specimen's stridulatory organs. After further investigation, he named it as a new species in a new genus, Pseudotheraphosa. In 2001, based on a phylogenetic analysis, Rogério Bertani rejected this genus and placed the species in Theraphosa, a view followed since by other workers.

== In captivity ==
Theraphosa apophysis is considered to be a difficult tarantula to care for and maintain, and is therefore not recommended for beginners. This is due to their nervous and defensive disposition, as well as high humidity requirements. However, their large size, food-aggressiveness, and fast growth rate make them desirable for more experienced keepers.
