= Miaschistopus =

Scientific classification
- Kingdom: Animalia
- Phylum: Arthropoda
- Subphylum: Chelicerata
- Class: Arachnida
- Order: Araneae
- Infraorder: Mygalomorphae
- Family: Theraphosidae
- Genus: Miaschistopus
- Species: M. tetricus

Binomial name
- Miaschistopus tetricus (Simon, 1889)

Genus of spiders

Miaschistopus is a genus of spiders in the family Theraphosidae. It was first described in 1897 by Pocock. As of 2017, it contains only one species, Miaschistopus tetricus, from Venezuela.
