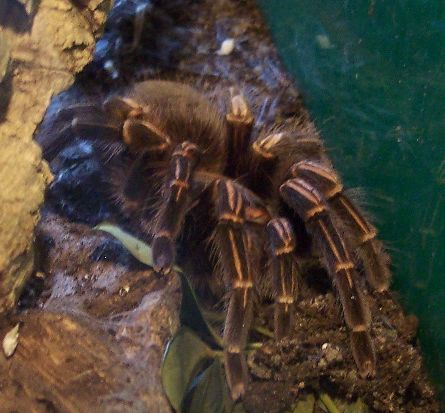
- Lasiodorides striatus

Scientific classification
- Kingdom: Animalia
- Phylum: Arthropoda
- Subphylum: Chelicerata
- Class: Arachnida
- Order: Araneae
- Infraorder: Mygalomorphae
- Family: Theraphosidae
- Genus: Lasiodorides; Schmidt & Bischoff, 1997

Type species
- L. polycuspulatus Schmidt & Bischoff, 1997

Species
- 2, see text

= Lasiodorides =

Genus of spiders

Lasiodorides is a genus of South American tarantulas that was first described by Günter E. W. Schmidt & B. Bischoff in 1997.

== Species ==
As of July 2021 it contains two species, found in Peru and Ecuador:

- Lasiodorides polycuspulatus Schmidt & Bischoff, 1997 (type) – Peru
- Lasiodorides striatus (Schmidt & Antonelli, 1996) – Peru
