= Crypticarachne =

Scientific classification
- Kingdom: Animalia
- Phylum: Arthropoda
- Subphylum: Chelicerata
- Class: Arachnida
- Order: Araneae
- Infraorder: Mygalomorphae
- Family: Theraphosidae
- Genus: Crypticarachne; Peñaherrera-R., Sherwood, Gabriel, León-E., Rollard, Leguin, Brescovit & Lucas, 2025
- Species: C. nadineae

Binomial name
- Crypticarachne nadineae (Sherwood & Gabriel, 2022)

Species of spider

Crypticarachne is a monotypic genus of spiders in the family Theraphosidae containing the single species, Crypticarachne nadineae.

== Distribution ==
Crypticarachne nadineae is endemic to Ecuador.

== Etymology ==
The genus name combines "cryptic" and arachne (spider), in reference to the cryptic nature of this spider. The species name honors arachnologist Nadine Dupérré.
