= Encantarana =

Scientific classification
- Kingdom: Animalia
- Phylum: Arthropoda
- Subphylum: Chelicerata
- Class: Arachnida
- Order: Araneae
- Infraorder: Mygalomorphae
- Family: Theraphosidae
- Genus: Encantarana; Sherwood, Gabriel, Peñaherrera-R., Rollard, Leguin & Privet, 2025
- Species: E. hamiltoni

Binomial name
- Encantarana hamiltoni Sherwood, Gabriel, Peñaherrera-R., Rollard, Leguin & Privet, 2025

Species of spider

Encantarana is a monotypic genus of spiders in the family Theraphosidae containing the single species, Encantarana hamiltoni.

It most closely resembles Holothele.

== Distribution ==
Encantarana hamiltoni is endemic to Puerto Rico.

== Etymology ==
The genus name is a combination of Spanish encanto "enchanted" and araña "spider", in reference to Puerto Rico's name as the "enchanted island". The species name honors arachnologist Chris A. Hamilton.
