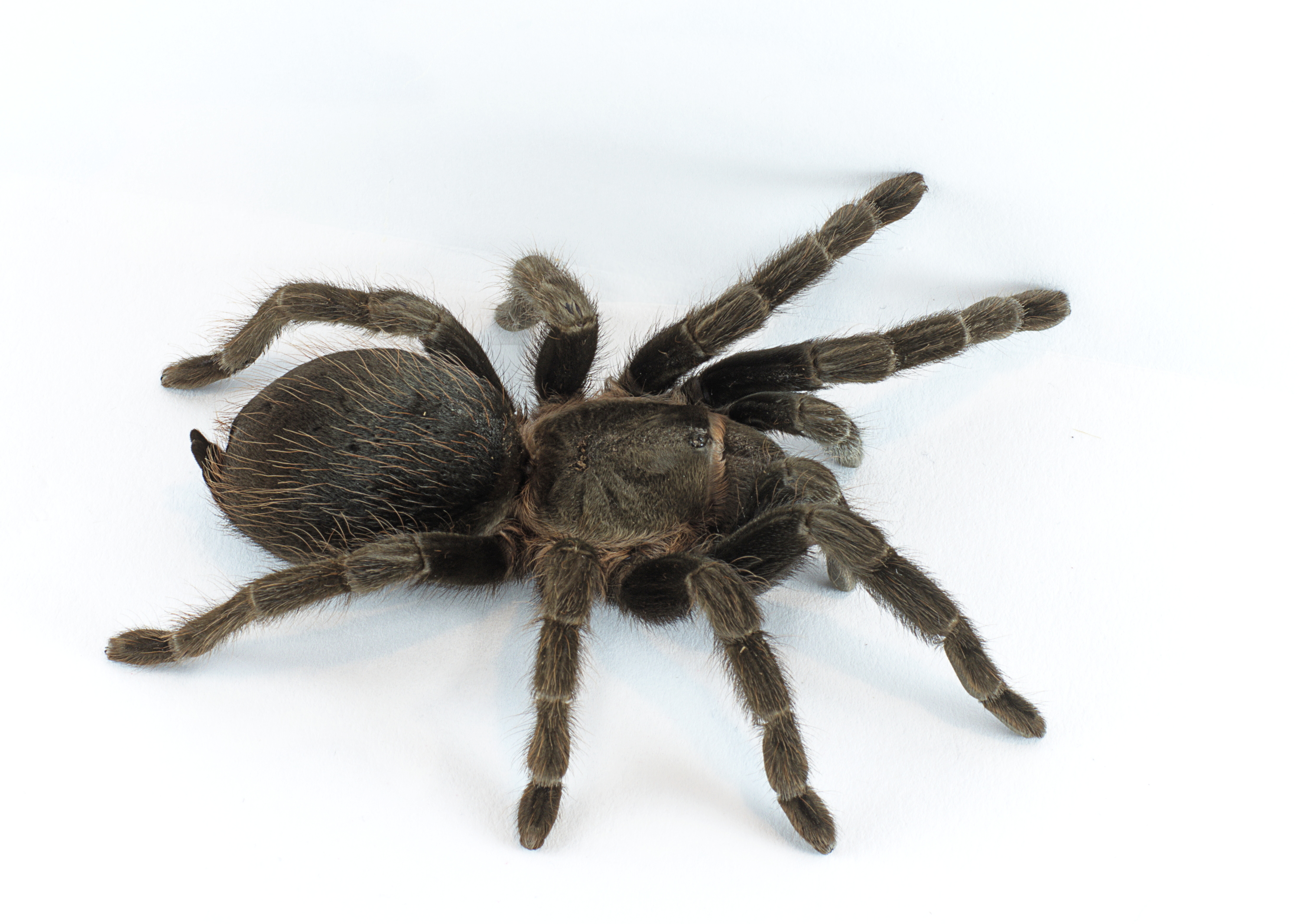
- Tliltocatl vagans

Scientific classification
- Kingdom: Animalia
- Phylum: Arthropoda
- Subphylum: Chelicerata
- Class: Arachnida
- Order: Araneae
- Infraorder: Mygalomorphae
- Clade: Avicularioidea
- Family: Theraphosidae; Thorell, 1869

Diversity
- 186 genera, 1,164 species
- blue: reported countries (WSC) green: observation hotspots (iNaturalist)

= Tarantula =

Tarantula Temporal range: Cretaceous–present

Family of spiders

Tarantulas are a group of large and often hairy spiders of the family Theraphosidae. More than a thousand species have been identified, within almost 200 genera. The term "tarantula" is usually used to describe members of the family Theraphosidae, although many other members of the same infraorder (Mygalomorphae) are commonly referred to as "tarantulas" or "false tarantulas". Some of the more common species have become popular in the exotic pet trade. Many New World species kept as pets have setae known as urticating hairs that can cause irritation to the skin, and in extreme cases, cause damage to the eyes.

== Overview ==
Like all arthropods, the tarantula is an invertebrate that relies on an exoskeleton for muscular support. Like other Arachnida, a tarantula's body comprises two main parts, the prosoma (or cephalothorax) and the opisthosoma (or abdomen). The prosoma and opisthosoma are connected by the pedicel, or pregenital somite. This waist-like connecting piece is actually part of the prosoma and gives the opisthosoma a wide range of motion relative to the prosoma.

Depending on the species, the body length of tarantulas ranges from about 5 to 11 cm (2 to 4 1/2 in) with leg spans of 8–30 cm (3–12 in). Leg span is determined by measuring from the tip of the back leg to the tip of the front leg on the opposite side. Some of the largest species of tarantula may weigh over 85 g (3 oz); the largest of all, the goliath birdeater (Theraphosa blondi) from Venezuela and Brazil, has been reported to attain a weight of 170 g (6 oz) and a leg-span up to 30 cm (12 in), males being longer and females greater in girth. The fang size of this tarantula reaches a maximum of 4 cm (1 1/2 in).

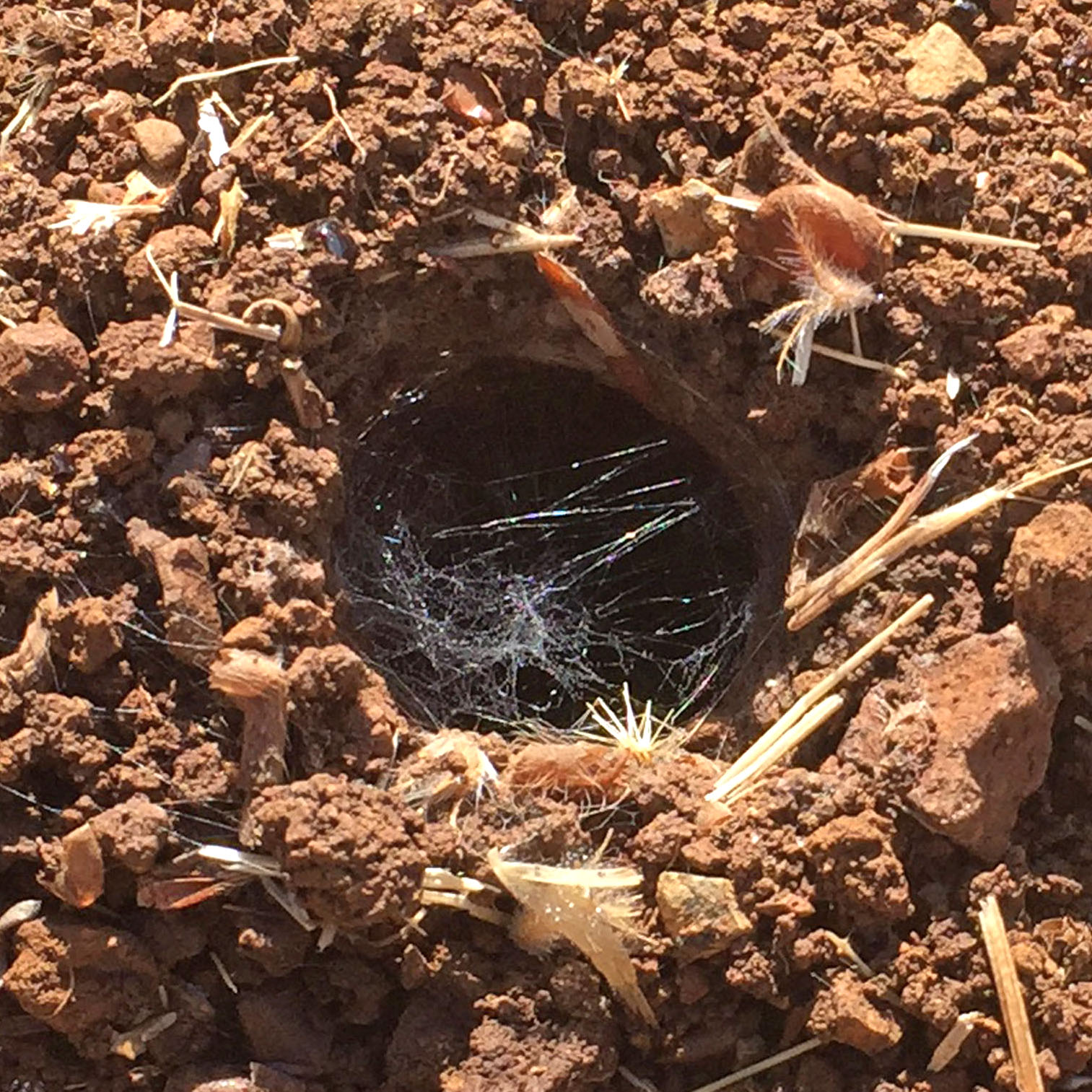
Opening to a tarantula burrow

Theraphosa apophysis (the pinkfoot goliath) was described 187 years after the goliath birdeater, so its characteristics are not as well attested. T. blondi is generally thought to be the heaviest tarantula, and T. apophysis has the greatest leg span. Two other species, Lasiodora parahybana (the Brazilian salmon birdeater) and Lasiodora klugi, rival the size of the two goliath spiders.

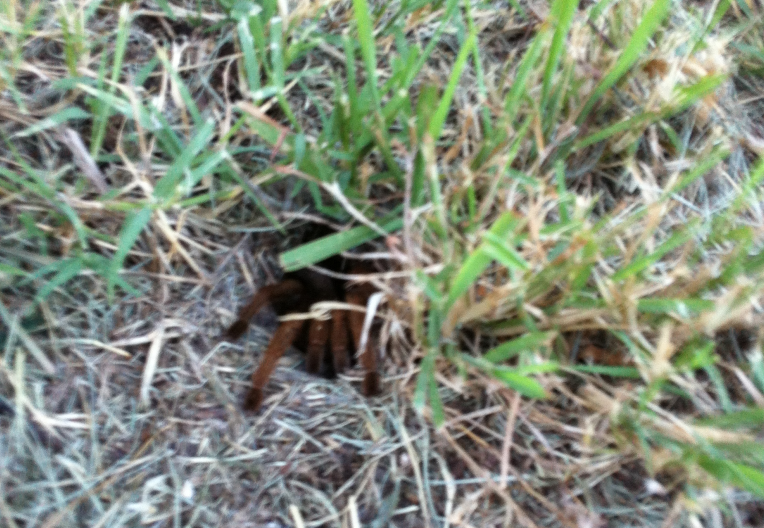
Tarantula at the mouth of its burrow

Most species of North American tarantulas are brown. Elsewhere, species have been found that variously display cobalt blue (Cyriopagopus lividus), black with white stripes (Aphonopelma seemanni), yellow leg markings (Eupalaestrus campestratus), metallic blue legs with vibrant orange abdomen and green prosoma (Chromatopelma cyaneopubescens). Their natural habitats include savanna, grassland such as in the pampas, rainforest, desert, scrubland, mountains, and cloud forest. They are generally classed among the terrestrial types. They are burrowers that live in the ground.

Tarantulas are becoming increasingly popular as pets and some species are readily available in captivity.

== Identification ==
Tarantulas can be confused with other members of the order Mygalomorphae, such as trapdoor spiders, funnel-web spiders and purseweb spiders. They can also be confused with some members of the order Araneomorphae such as the Lycosidae family. There are multiple ways to identify a tarantula. First the hairs: in the Americas most tarantulas have urticating hairs, though some, such as the Hemirrhagus genus, lack these. The hairs are usually more noticeable than with most other spiders. Another is the size, as tarantulas tend to be bigger, but this is again not a failproof way. They also do not use their webs for hunting, instead using them as building material or tripwire.

One of the most decisive ways to tell is by looking at their fangs. Tarantula fangs face downward, as opposed to those of true spiders, which face each other, allowing them to make pincerlike motions. They also have two book lungs, as opposed to true spiders, which only have one. Their lifespan is also longer than most spiders.

Comparison of the fangs between a tarantula and a 'true' spider

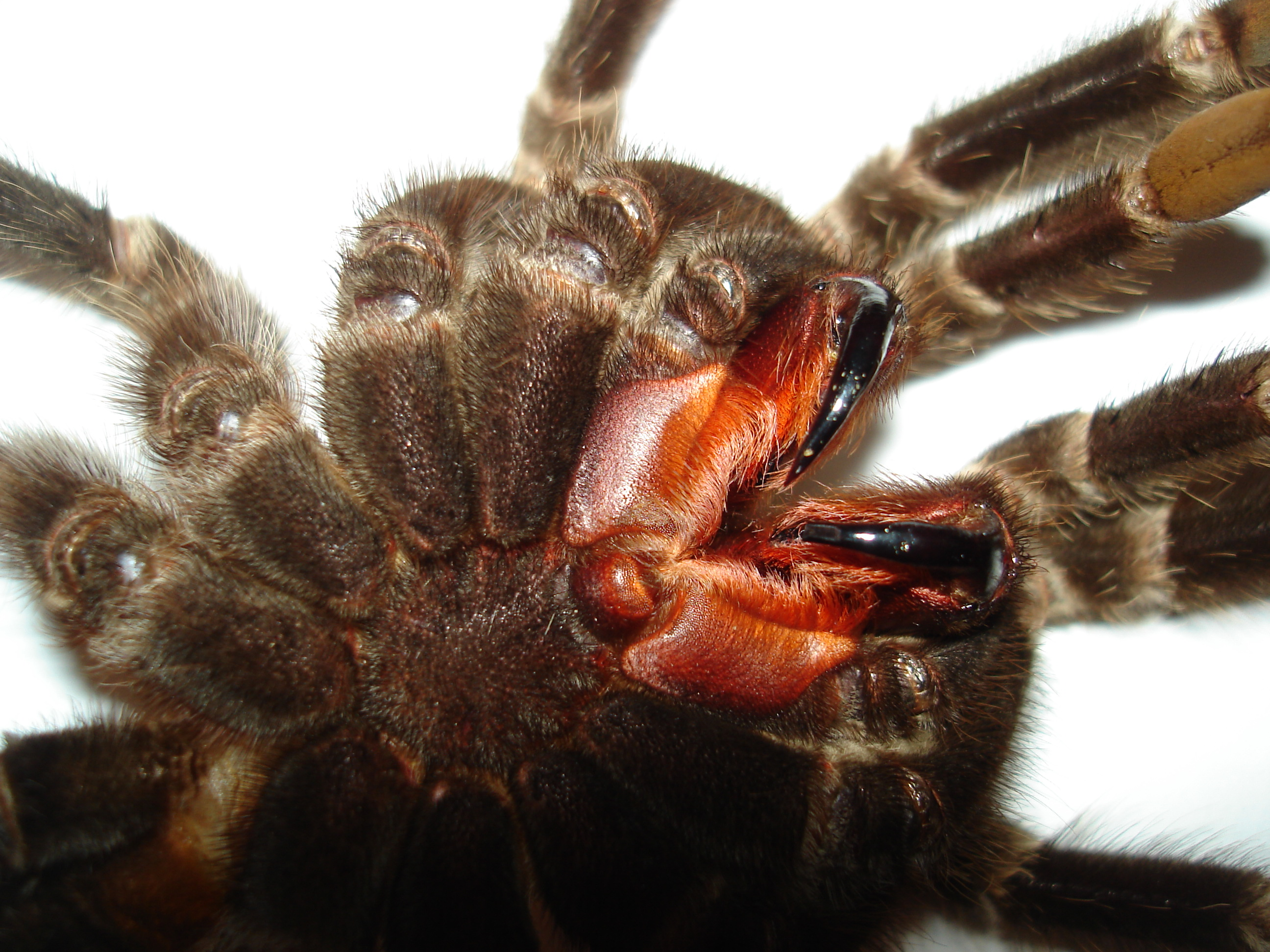
Fangs of the tarantula Lasiodora parahybana from below

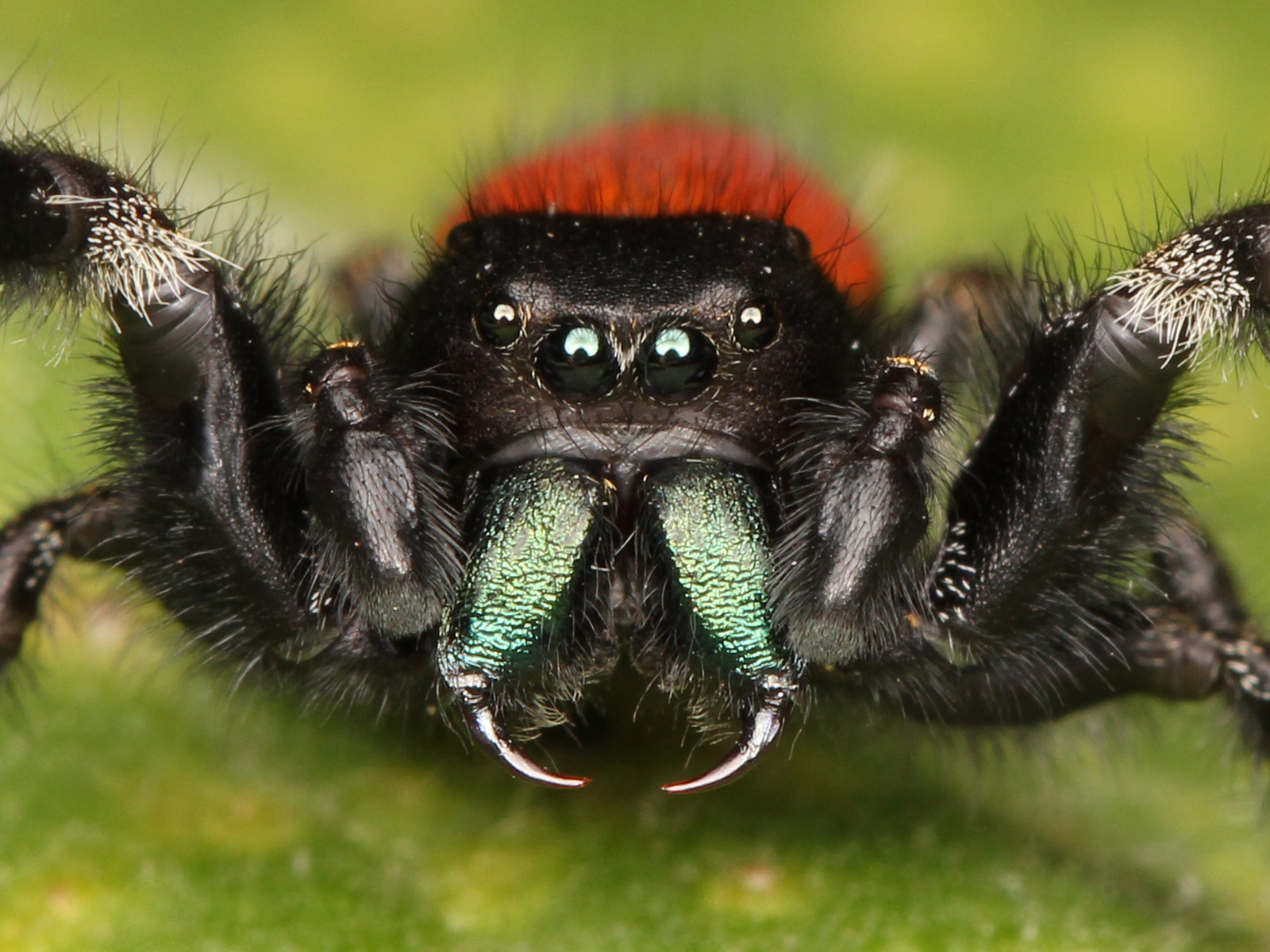
Fangs of the jumping spider Phidippus johnsoni, frontal view

== Etymology ==
The spider originally bearing the name tarantula was Lycosa tarantula, a species of wolf spider native to Mediterranean Europe. The name is derived from the southern Italian town of Taranto. The term tarantula was subsequently applied to almost any large, unfamiliar species of ground-dwelling spider, in particular to the Mygalomorphae and especially the New World Theraphosidae. Compared to tarantulas, wolf spiders are not particularly large or hairy, and so among English speakers in particular, usage eventually shifted in favour of the Theraphosidae, even though they are not closely related to wolf spiders at all, being in a different infraorder.

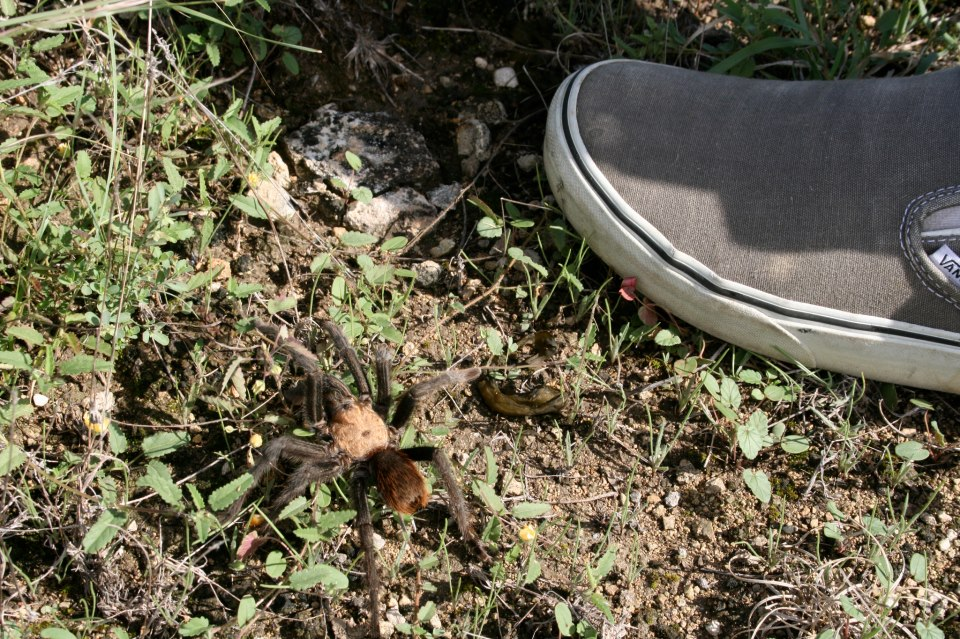
A tarantula next to a U.S. size 11 shoe, to show scale, taken near Austin, Texas

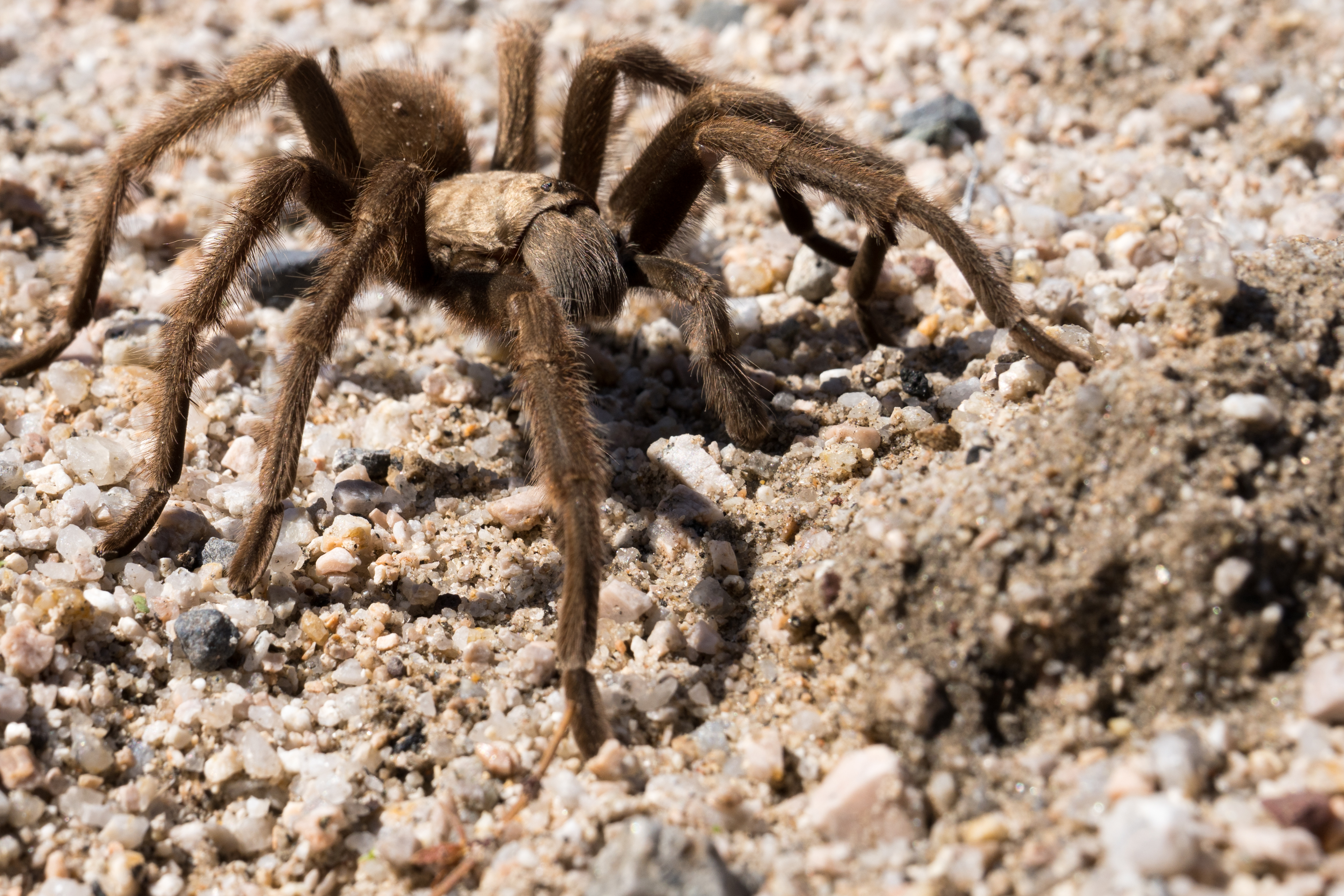
Aphonopelma mojave, a tarantula native to the Mojave Desert, searches for a burrow.

The name tarantula is also incorrectly applied to other large-bodied spiders, including the purseweb spiders or atypical tarantulas, the funnel-webs (Dipluridae and Hexathelidae), and the dwarf tarantulas. These spiders are related to tarantulas (all being mygalomorphs) but fall into different families from them. Huntsman spiders of the family Sparassidae have also been termed tarantulas because of their large size, when, in fact, they are not related. Instead, huntsman spiders belong to the infraorder Araneomorphae.

=== The element pelma in genus names ===
Many theraphosid genera have names, either accepted or synonymous, containing the element pelma. This can be traced back to Carl Ludwig Koch in 1850, who in describing his new genus Eurypelma wrote, "Die Sammetbürste der Fussohlen sehr breit" (lit. 'the velvet-brush of the footsole very wide'). German arachnologists use the word Fuß to refer to the tarsus (the last article of a spider's leg). Translations of Sammetbürste into Latin use the word scopula. Hence in English arachnological terminology, Koch meant 'the scopula of the base of the tarsus very wide'. Eury- is derived from the Greek eurýs (εὐρύϛ), meaning 'wide', while pélma (πέλμα) means 'the sole of the foot', paralleling Koch's use of Fußsohle (in modern spelling). Thus Eurypelma literally means 'wide footsole'; however, arachnologists have conventionally taken pelma in such names to refer to the scopula, so producing the meaning 'with a wide scopula'.

Other genus names or synonyms that Estrada-Alvarez and Cameron regard as having 'footsole' or 'scopula' meanings include:

- Acanthopelma – Greek ácantha (ἄκανθα) 'thorn, spine'; overall meaning 'spiny footsole'
- Brachypelma – Greek brachýs (βραχύϛ) 'short'; overall meaning 'short scopula'
- Metriopelma – Greek métrios (μέτριοϛ) 'of moderate size'; overall meaning 'medium length scopula'
- Schizopelma – from the Greek origin combining form schizo- (σχίζω) 'split'; overall meaning 'split footsole'
- Sericopelma – Greek sericós (σηρικόϛ) 'silky'; overall meaning 'silken scopula'

Later, particularly following genus names published by R.I. Pocock in 1901, the element pelma appears to have become synonymous with 'theraphosid'. For example, the author of Cardiopelma writes, "Cardiopelma fait réference aux genitalia de la femelle qui évoquent la forme d'un Coeur" ('Cardiopelma refers to the female genitalia that evoke the shape of a heart'), with no reference to either 'footsole' or 'scopula'. Names interpreted in this way include:

- Aphonopelma – Greek áphonos (ἄφωνοϛ) 'soundless'; overall meaning 'theraphosid without sound'
- Cardiopelma – Greek cardía (καρδία) 'heart'; overall meaning 'heart theraphosid' (referring to the heart-shaped female genitalia)
- Clavopelma – Latin clavis 'club'; overall meaning 'theraphosid with club-shaped hairs'
- Delopelma – Greek delós (δηλόϛ) 'clear, obvious, visible, conspicuous, plain'; overall meaning 'theraphosid without plumose hair'
- Gosipelma – the element gosi- means 'desert', relating to the Gosiute people; overall meaning 'desert theraphosid'
- Spelopelma – Greek spélaion (σπήλαιον) 'cave'; overall meaning 'cave theraphosid'

== Distribution ==
Tarantula striking at a cricket

Tarantulas of various species occur throughout the United States, Mexico, Central America, and throughout South America. Other species occur variously throughout Africa, much of Asia (including the Ryukyu Islands in southern Japan), and all of Australia. In Europe, some species occur in Spain, Portugal, Turkey, southern Italy, and Cyprus.

== Habits ==
Some genera of tarantulas hunt prey primarily in trees; others hunt on or near the ground. All tarantulas can produce silk; while arboreal species typically reside in a silken "tube tent", terrestrial species line their burrows with silk to stabilize the burrow wall and facilitate climbing up and down. Tarantulas mainly eat large insects and other arthropods such as centipedes, millipedes, and other spiders, using ambush as their primary method of prey capture. Armed with their massive, powerful chelicerae tipped with long, chitinous fangs, tarantulas are well-adapted to killing other large arthropods. The biggest tarantulas sometimes kill and consume small vertebrates such as lizards, mice, bats, birds, and small snakes.

=== Appendages ===
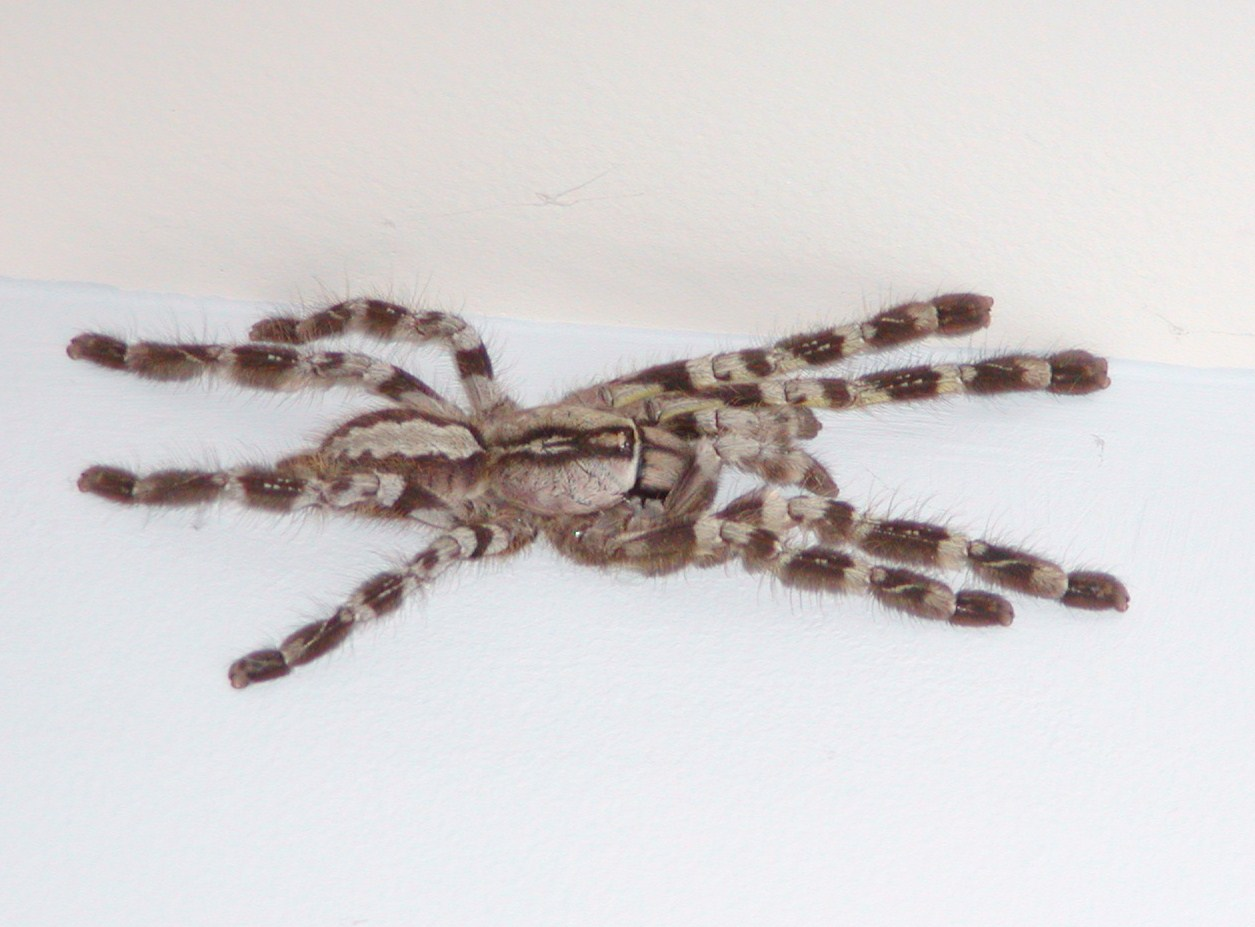
Subadult female Poecilotheria regalis

The eight legs, the two chelicerae with their fangs, and the pedipalps are attached to the prosoma. The chelicerae are two double-segmented appendages located just below the eyes and directly forward of the mouth. The chelicerae contain the venom glands that vent through the fangs. The fangs are hollow extensions of the chelicerae that inject venom into prey or animals that the tarantula bites in defense, and they are also used to masticate. These fangs are articulated so that they can extend downward and outward in preparation to bite or can fold back toward the chelicerae as a pocket knife blade folds back into its handle. The chelicerae of a tarantula completely contain the venom glands and the muscles that surround them, and can cause the venom to be forcefully injected into prey.

The pedipalpi are two six-segmented appendages connected to the prosoma near the mouth and protruding on either side of both chelicerae. In most species of tarantulas, the pedipalpi contain sharp, jagged plates used to cut and crush food often called the coxae or maxillae. As with other spiders, the terminal portions of the pedipalpi of males function as part of their reproductive system. Male spiders spin a silken platform (sperm web) on the ground onto which they release semen from glands in their opisthosoma. Then they insert their pedipalps into the semen, absorb the semen into the pedipalps, and later insert the pedipalps (one at a time) into the reproductive organ of the female, which is located in her abdomen. The terminal segments of the pedipalps of male tarantulas are moderately larger in circumference than those of a female tarantula. Male tarantulas have special spinnerets surrounding the genital opening. Silk for the sperm web of the tarantula is exuded from these special spinnerets.

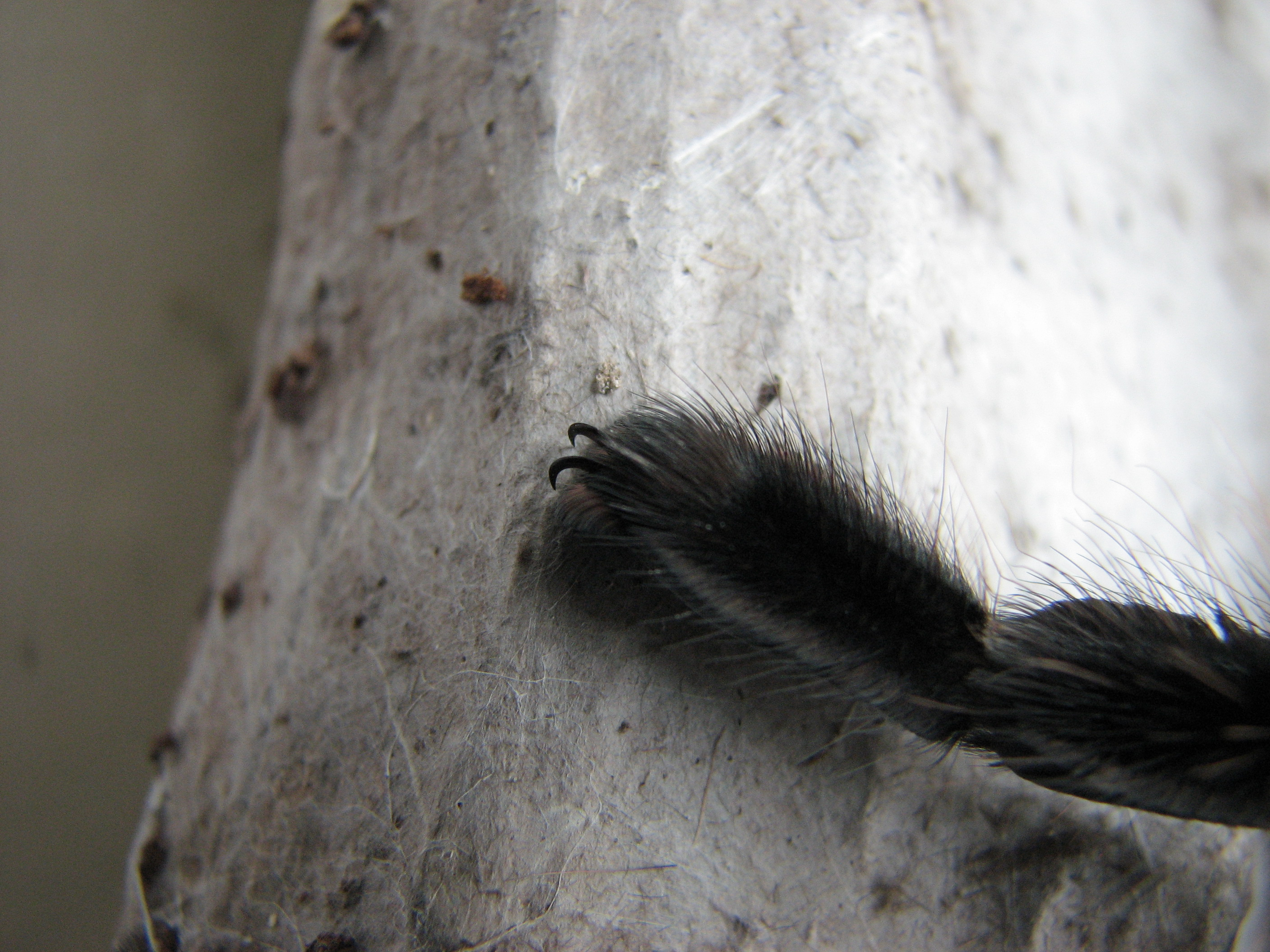
Claws at the end of the leg of Lasiodora parahybana

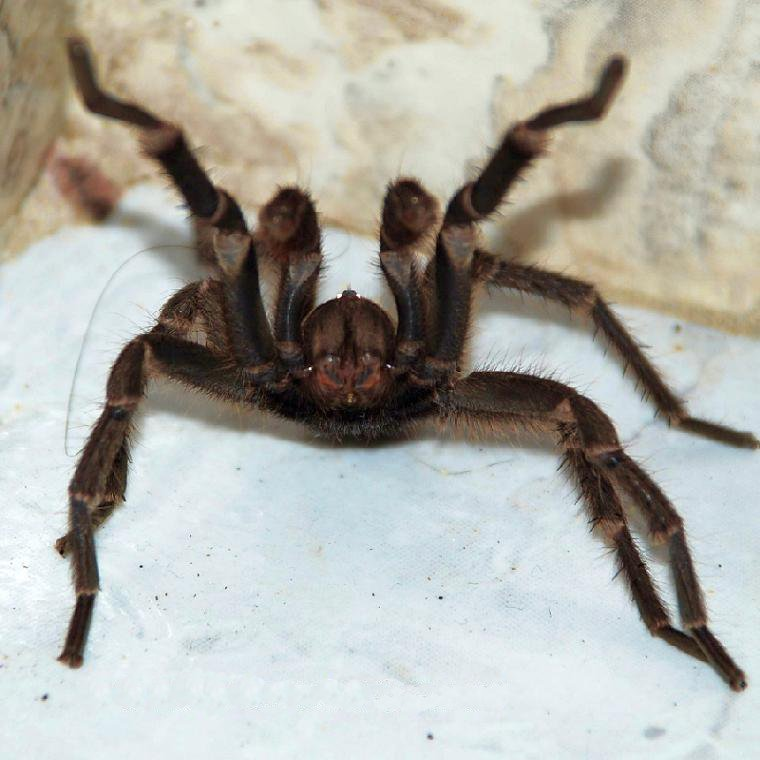
A Brazilian tarantula in defensively threatening position

A tarantula has four pairs of legs and two additional pairs of appendages. Each leg has seven segments, which from the prosoma out are: coxa, trochanter, femur, patella, tibia, tarsus and pretarsus, and claw. Two or three retractable claws at the end of each leg are used to grip surfaces for climbing. Also on the end of each leg, surrounding the claws, is a group of bristles, called the scopula, which help the tarantula to grip better when climbing surfaces such as glass. The fifth pair is the pedipalps, which aid in feeling, gripping prey, and mating in the case of a mature male. The sixth pair of appendages is the chelicerae and their attached fangs. When walking, a tarantula's first and third legs on one side move at the same time as the second and fourth legs on the other side of its body. The muscles in a tarantula's legs cause the legs to bend at the joints, but to extend a leg, the tarantula increases the pressure of haemolymph entering the leg.

Tarantulas, like almost all other spiders, have their primary spinnerets at the end of the opisthosoma. Unlike most spider species in the infraorder Araneomorphae, which includes the majority of extant spider species, and most of which have six, tarantula species have two or four spinnerets. Spinnerets are flexible, tube-like structures from which the spider exudes its silk. The tip of each spinneret is called the spinning field. Each spinning field is covered by as many as 100 spinning tubes through which silk is exuded. As the silk is pulled out of the spinnerets, the shear forces cause proteins in the silk to crystallize, transforming it from a liquid to a solid thread.

== Internal anatomy ==
=== Digestive system ===
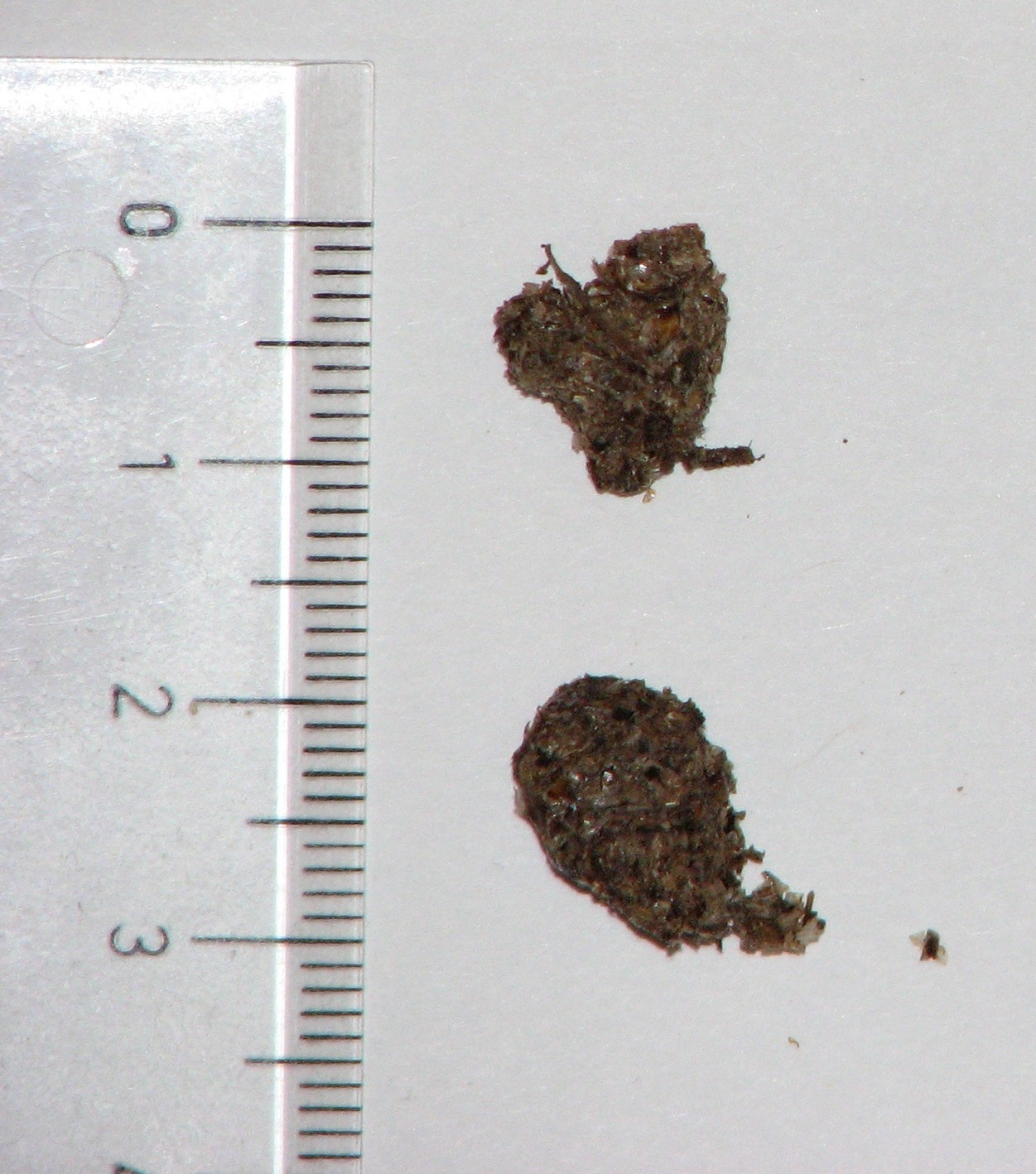
Tarantula food leftovers

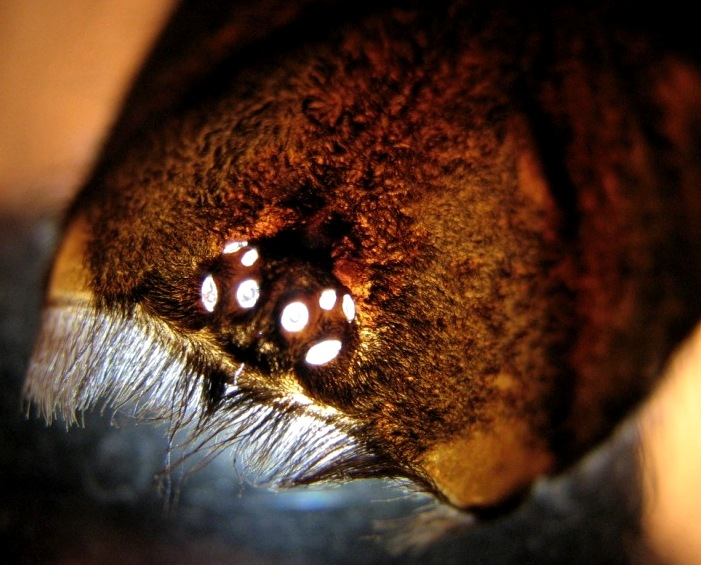
Eye ports seen in an exuvia (molted skin)

The tarantula's mouth is located under its chelicerae on the lower front part of its prosoma. The mouth is a short, straw-shaped opening that can only suck, meaning that anything taken into it must be in liquid form. Prey with large amounts of solid parts, such as mice, must be crushed and ground up or predigested, which is accomplished by coating the prey with digestive juices secreted from openings in the chelicerae.

The tarantula's digestive organ (stomach) is a tube that runs the length of its body. In the prosoma, this tube is wider and forms the sucking stomach. When the sucking stomach's powerful muscles contract, the stomach is increased in cross-section, creating a strong sucking action that permits the tarantula to suck its liquefied prey up through the mouth and into the intestines. Once the liquefied food enters the intestines, it is broken down into particles small enough to pass through the intestine walls into the hemolymph (blood stream), where it is distributed throughout the body. After feeding, the leftovers are formed into a small ball by the tarantula and thrown away. In a terrarium, they often put them into the same corner.

=== Nervous system ===
A tarantula's central nervous system (brain) is located in the bottom of the inner prosoma. A tarantula perceives its surroundings primarily via sensory organs called setae (bristles or spines, sometimes referred to as hairs). Although a tarantula has eight eyes like most spiders, touch is its keenest sense, and in hunting, it primarily depends on vibrations given off by the movements of its prey. A tarantula's setae are very sensitive organs and are used to sense chemical signatures, vibrations, wind direction, and possibly even sound. Tarantulas are also very responsive to the presence of certain chemicals such as pheromones.

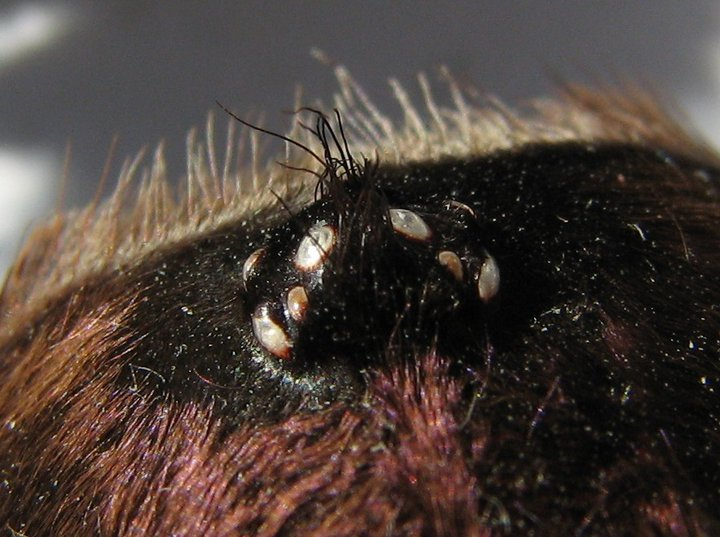
Close-up of a tarantula's eyes

The eyes are located above the chelicerae on the forward part of the prosoma. They are small and are usually set in two rows of four. Most tarantulas are not able to see much more than light, darkness, and motion. Arboreal tarantulas generally have better vision compared to terrestrial tarantulas.

=== Respiratory system ===
All types of tarantulas have two sets of book lungs (breathing organs); the first pair is located in a cavity inside the lower front part of the abdomen near where the abdomen connects to the cephalothorax, and the second pair is slightly farther back on the abdomen. Air enters the cavity through a tiny slit on each side of and near the front of the abdomen. Each lung consists of 15 or more thin sheets of folded tissue arranged like the pages of a book. These sheets of tissue are supplied by blood vessels. As air enters each lung, oxygen is taken into the blood stream through the blood vessels in the lungs. Needed moisture may also be absorbed from humid air by these organs.

=== Circulatory system ===
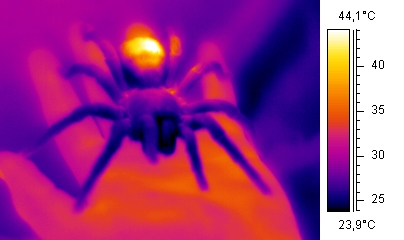
Thermal image of an ectothermic tarantula on an endothermic human hand

A tarantula's blood is unique (not only in appearance); an oxygen-transporting protein is present (the copper-based hemocyanin), but not enclosed in blood cells such as the erythrocytes of mammals. A tarantula's blood is not true blood, but rather a liquid called hemolymph (or haemolymph). At least four types of hemocytes, or hemolymph cells, are known.

The tarantula's heart is a long, slender tube located along the top of the opisthosoma. The heart is neurogenic as opposed to myogenic, so nerve cells instead of muscle cells initiate and coordinate the heart. It pumps hemolymph to all parts of the body through open passages often referred to as sinuses, and not through a circular system of blood vessels. If the exoskeleton is breached, loss of hemolymph will kill the spider unless the wound is small enough that the hemolymph can dry and close it.

== Predators ==
Despite their large size, fearsome appearance, and reputation, tarantulas themselves are prey for many other animals. The most specialized of these predators are large members of the wasp family Pompilidae such as the wasp Hemipepsis ustulata. These wasps are called "tarantula hawks". The largest tarantula hawks, such as those in the genus Pepsis, track, attack, and kill large tarantulas. They use olfaction to find the lair of a tarantula. The wasp must deliver a sting to the underside of the spider's cephalothorax, exploiting the thin membrane between the basal leg segments. This paralyzes the spider, and the wasp then drags it back into its burrow before depositing an egg on the prey's abdomen. The wasp then seals the spider in its burrow and flies off to search for more hosts. The wasp egg hatches into a larva and feeds on the spider's inessential parts, and as it approaches pupation, it consumes the remainder. Other arthropods, such as large scorpions and giant centipedes, are also known to prey on tarantulas.

Tarantulas are also preyed upon by a wide variety of vertebrates. Many of these, including lizards, frogs, birds, snakes and mammals, are generalist predators of all kinds of large arthropods. Mammals that have been known to prey on tarantulas, such as the coati, kinkajou, and opossum in the New World, and mongooses and the honey badger in the Old World, are often immune to the venom of their arthropod prey.

Humans also consume tarantulas for food in their native ranges. They are considered a delicacy in certain cultures (e.g. Venezuela and Cambodia). They can be roasted over an open fire to remove the bristles (described further below) and then eaten.

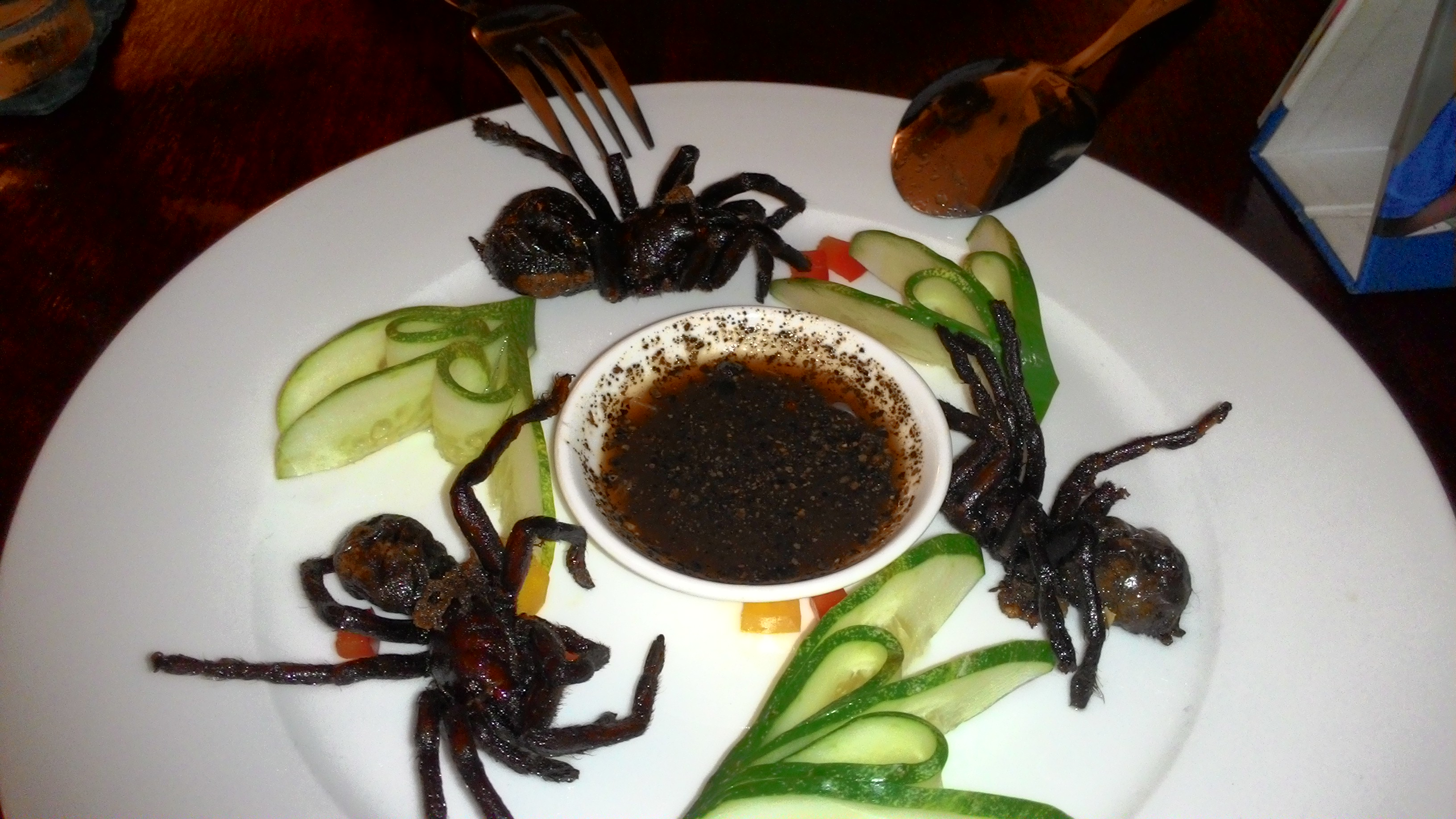
Fried tarantula in a Cambodian restaurant

Tarantulas have evolved specialized bristles, or setae, to defend themselves against predators. Besides the normal bristles covering the body, some tarantulas also have a dense covering of irritating bristles called urticating hairs, on the opisthosoma, that they sometimes use as protection against enemies. These bristles are present on most New World species, but not on any specimens from the Old World. Urticating hairs are usually kicked off the abdomen by the tarantula, but some may simply rub the abdomen against the target, like the genus Avicularia. These fine bristles are barbed and serve to irritate. They can be lethal to small animals such as rodents. Some people are sensitive to these bristles, and develop serious itching and rashes at the site. Exposure of the eyes and respiratory system to urticating hairs should be strictly avoided. Species with urticating hairs can kick these bristles off; they are flicked into the air at a target using their back pairs of legs. Tarantulas also use these bristles for other purposes, such as to mark territory or to line their shelters (the latter such practice may discourage flies from feeding on the spiderlings). Urticating hairs do not grow back, but are replaced with each molt. The intensity, number, and flotation of the bristles depends on the species of tarantula.

To predators and other enemies, these bristles can range from being lethal to simply being a deterrent. With humans, they can cause irritation to eyes, nose, and skin, and more dangerously, the lungs and airways, if inhaled. The symptoms range from species to species, from person to person, from a burning itch to a minor rash. In some cases, tarantula bristles have caused permanent damage to human eyes.

Some setae are used to stridulate, which makes a hissing sound. These bristles are usually found on the chelicerae. Stridulation seems to be more common in Old World species.

== Bites and urticating bristles ==
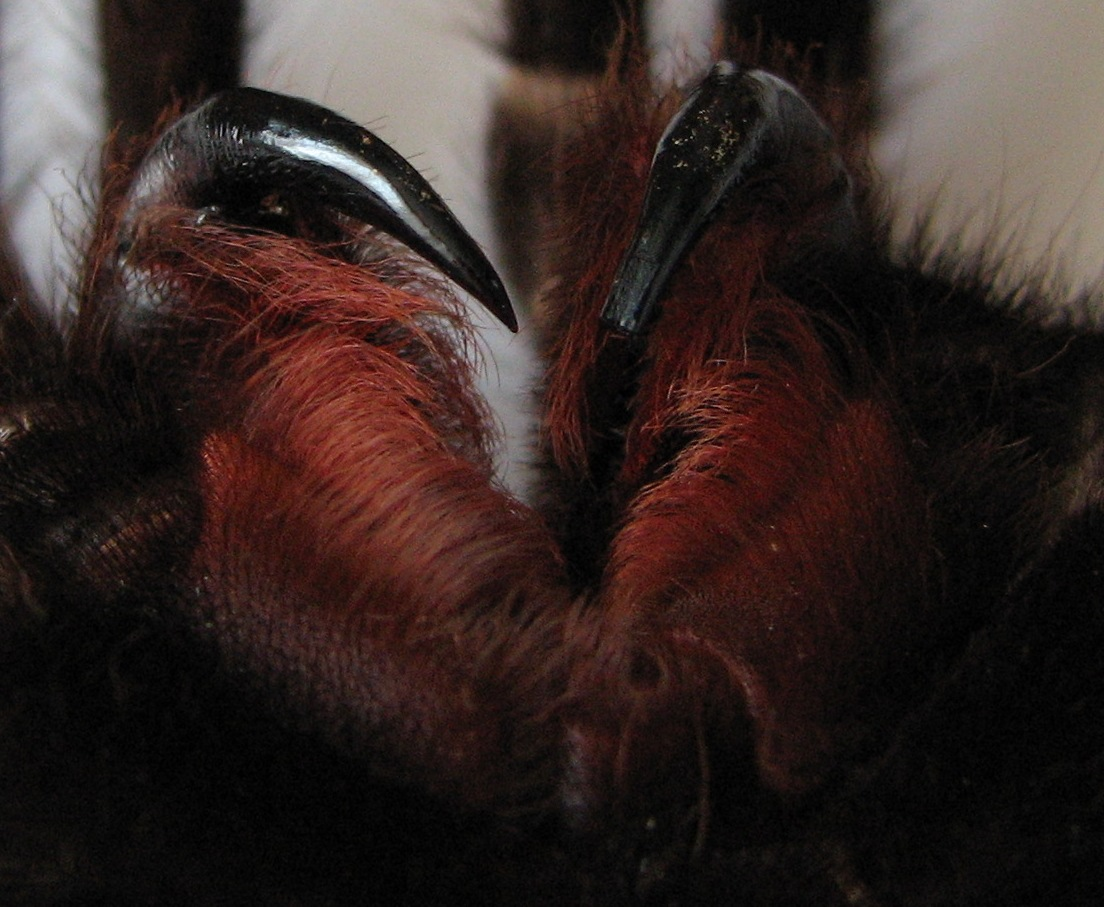
L. parahybana, chelicerae of an adult female

All tarantulas are venomous. Although their venom is not deadly to humans, some bites cause serious discomfort that might persist for several days. In general, the effects of the bites of all kinds of tarantula are not well known. While the bites of many species are known to be no worse than a wasp sting, accounts of bites by some species are reported to be very painful and to produce intense spasms that may recur over a period of several days; the venom of the African tarantula Pelinobius muticus also causes strong hallucinations. For Poecilotheria species, researchers have described more than 20 bites with the delayed onset of severe and diffuse muscle cramps, lasting for several days, that in most cases resolved completely with the use of benzodiazepines and magnesium. In all cases, seeking medical aid is advised. Because other proteins are included when a toxin is injected, some individuals may suffer severe symptoms due to an allergic reaction rather than to the venom. Such allergic effects can be life-threatening. Additionally, the large fangs of a tarantula can inflict painful puncture wounds, which can lead to secondary bacterial infections if not properly treated.

Before biting, a tarantula may signal its intention to attack by rearing up into a "threat posture", which may involve raising its prosoma and lifting its front legs into the air, spreading and extending its fangs, and (in certain species) making a loud hissing by stridulating. Tarantulas often hold this position for longer than the duration of the original threat. Their next step, without biting, may be to slap down on the intruder with their raised front legs. If that response fails to deter the attacker, the tarantulas of the Americas may next turn away and flick urticating hairs toward the pursuing predator. The next response may be to leave the scene entirely, but especially if no line of retreat is available, their final response may also be to whirl suddenly and bite. Some tarantulas are well known to give "dry bites", i.e., they may defensively bite some animal that intrudes on their space and threatens them, but they do not pump venom into the wound.

New-world tarantulas—those indigenous to the Americas—have bites that generally pose little threat to humans (other than causing localized pain). Most of them are equipped with urticating hairs on their abdomens, and almost always throw these barbed bristles as the first line of defense. These bristles irritate sensitive areas of the body and especially seem to target curious animals that may sniff these bristles into the mucous membranes of the nose. Some species have more effective urticating bristles than others. The goliath birdeater is known for its particularly irritating urticating bristles. They can penetrate the cornea, so eye protection should be worn when handling such tarantulas.

Old World tarantulas have no urticating bristles and are more likely to attack when disturbed. They often have more potent, medically significant venom, and are faster and much more nervous and defensive than New World species.

Some dangerous spider species are related to tarantulas and are frequently confused with them. A popular urban legend maintains that deadly varieties of tarantula exist somewhere in South America. This claim is often made without identifying a particular spider, although the "banana tarantula" is sometimes named. A likely candidate for the true identity of this spider is the dangerous Brazilian wandering spider of the family Ctenidae, as it is sometimes found hiding in clusters of bananas and is one of several spiders called "banana spiders". It is not technically a tarantula, but it is fairly large (4- to 5-inch legspan), somewhat ″hairy″, and is highly venomous to humans. Another dangerous type of spiders that have been confused with tarantulas are the Australian funnel-web spiders. The best known species of these is the Sydney funnel-web spider (Atrax robustus) a spider that is aggressive, highly venomous, and (prior to the development of antivenom in the 1980s) was responsible for numerous deaths in Australia. These spiders are members of the same infraorder as tarantulas, Mygalomorphae. Some Australians use the slang term "triantelope" (a corruption of the incorrect term tarantula, which is also used) for large, ″hairy″, and harmless members of the huntsman spider family, which are often found on interior household walls and in automobiles.

== Sexual dimorphism ==
Some tarantula species exhibit pronounced sexual dimorphism. Males tend to be smaller (especially their abdomens, which can appear quite narrow) and may be dull in color when compared to their female counterparts, as in the species Haplopelma lividum. Mature male tarantulas also may have tibial hooks on their front legs, which are used to restrain the female's fangs during copulation. Males typically have longer legs than the females.

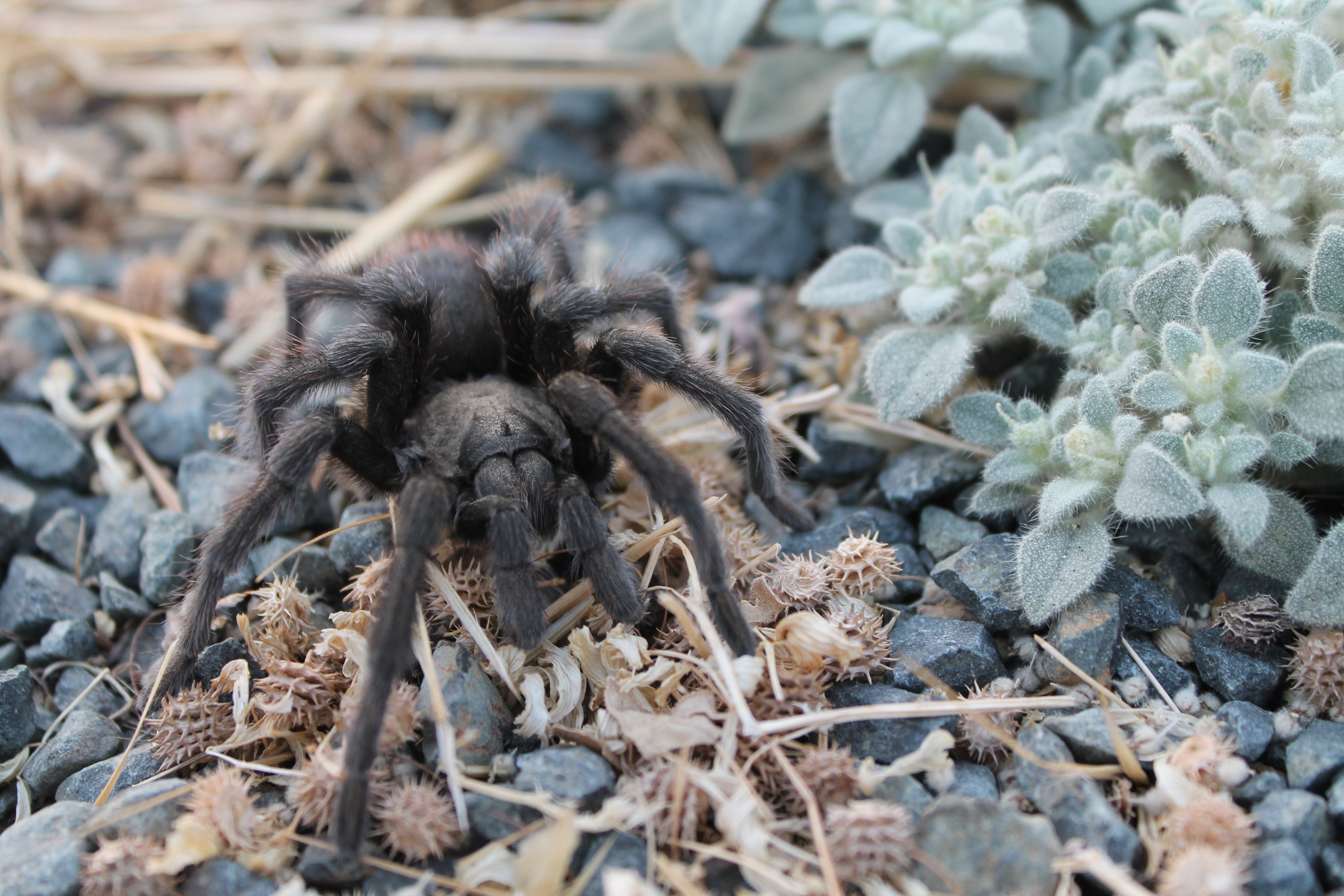
Male California ebony tarantula (Aphonopelma eutylenum) wandering near Exeter, CA

A juvenile male's sex can be determined by looking at a cast exuvia for epiandrous fusillae or spermathecae. Females possess spermathecae, except for the species Sickius longibulbi and Encyocratella olivacea. Males have much shorter lifespans than females because they die relatively soon after maturing. Few live long enough for a postultimate molt, which is unlikely in natural habitats because they are vulnerable to predation, but has happened in captivity, though rarely. Most males do not live through this molt, as they tend to get their emboli, mature male sexual organs on pedipalps, stuck in the molt. Most tarantula fanciers regard females as more desirable as pets due to their much longer lifespans. Wild-caught tarantulas are often mature males because they wander out in the open and are more likely to be caught.

== Life cycle ==
The molting process

Like other spiders, tarantulas have to shed their exoskeleton periodically as they grow, a process called molting. A young tarantula may do this several times a year as a part of the maturation process, while full-grown specimens only molt once a year or less, or sooner, to replace lost limbs or lost urticating hairs. It is visibly apparent that molting is imminent when the exoskeleton takes on a darker shade. If a tarantula previously used its urticating hairs, the bald patch turns from a peach color to deep blue. The tarantula also stops feeding and becomes more lethargic during this time.

While most Tarantulas species take between two and five years to reach sexual maturity, some species can take up to 10 years. Upon reaching adulthood, males typically have an 18-month period left to live so immediately go in search of a female mate. Although females continue to molt after reaching maturity, males rarely do again once they reach adulthood. Those that do often can become stuck during the molting process due to their sexual organs and die.

Females can live for 30 to 40 years. Grammostola rosea spiders, which eat once or twice a week, have lived up to 20 years in captivity. Some have survived on water alone for up to two years.

=== Reproduction ===
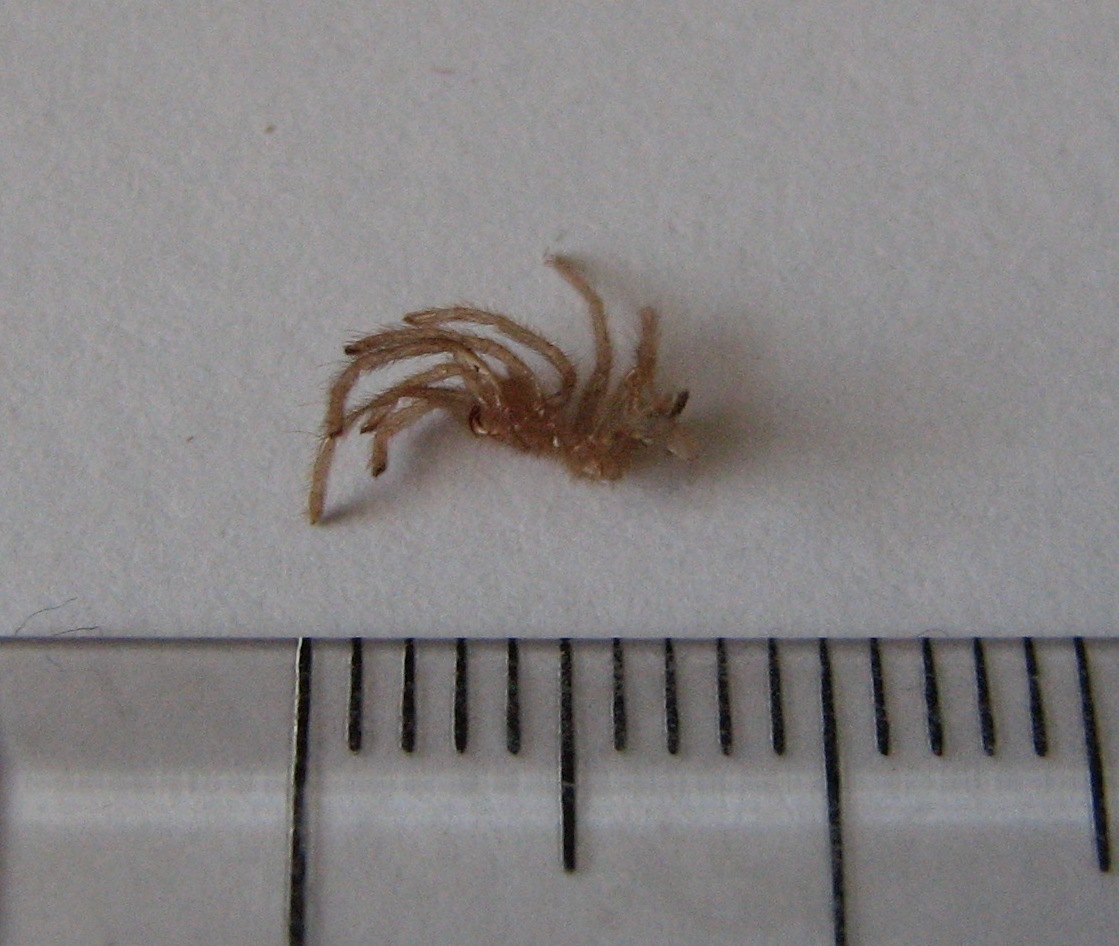
The molted skin of a juvenile Phormictopus cancerides cancerides (second molting)

After reaching sexual maturity, a female tarantula normally mates and lays eggs once per year, although they do not always do so.

As with other spiders, the mechanics of intercourse are quite different from those of mammals. Once a male spider reaches maturity and becomes motivated to mate, he weaves a web mat on a flat surface. The spider then rubs his abdomen on the surface of this mat, and in so doing, releases a quantity of semen. He may then insert his pedipalps (short, leg-like appendages between the chelicerae and front legs) into the pool of semen. The pedipalps absorb the semen and keep it viable until a mate can be found. When a male spider detects the presence of a female, the two exchange signals to establish that they are of the same species. These signals may also lull the female into a receptive state. If the female is receptive, then the male approaches her and inserts his pedipalps into an opening in the lower surface of her abdomen, the opisthosoma. After the semen has been transferred to the receptive female's body, the male swiftly leaves the scene before the female recovers her appetite. Although females may show some aggression after mating, the male rarely becomes a meal.

Females deposit 50 to 2,000 eggs, depending on the species, in a silken egg sac and guard it for six to eight weeks. During this time, the females stay very close to the egg sacs and become more aggressive. Within most species, the females turn the egg sac often, which is called brooding. This keeps the eggs from deforming due to sitting in one position too long. The young spiderlings remain in the nest for some time after hatching, where they live off the remains of their yolk sacs before dispersing.

== Taxonomy ==
Linnaeus placed all spiders in a single genus, Aranea. In 1802, Charles Athanase Walckenaer separated mygalomorph spiders into a separate genus, Mygale, leaving all other spiders in Aranea. However, Mygale had already been used in 1800 by Georges Cuvier for a genus of mammals (in Greek, mygale means "shrew"). Accordingly, in 1869, Tamerlan Thorell used the family name "Theraphosoidae" (modern Theraphosidae) for the mygalomorph spiders known to him, rather than "Mygalidae" (as used, for example, by John Blackwall). Thorell later split the family into a number of genera, including Theraphosa.

=== Subfamilies ===
A 2019 phylogenomic study recognized 12 subfamilies, one (Ischnocolinae) known not to be monophyletic.

- Aviculariinae
- Eumenophorinae
- Harpactirinae
- Ischnocolinae
- Ornithoctoninae
- Poecilotheriinae
- Psalmopoeinae
- Schismatothelinae
- Selenocosmiinae
- Stromatopelminae
- Theraphosinae
- Thrigmopoeinae

The relationship between the subfamilies found in the study is shown in the following cladogram. The dual placing of Ischnocolinae is highlighted.

- Theraphosidae
  - - Ischnocolinae (Catamiri sp.)
    - Eumenophorinae
  - - - Thrigmopoeinae
      - Selenocosmiinae
    - - - - Poecilotheriinae
          - Ornithoctoninae
        - - Stromatopelminae
          - Harpactirinae
      - - Ischnocolinae (Trichopelma laselva)
        - "bombardier clade"
          - - Aviculariinae
            - - Schismatothelinae
              - Psalmopoeinae
          - Theraphosinae

All the species that possess urticating hairs and have been seen to use them in bombardment behavior are placed in the "bombardier clade", although not all species in the included subfamilies possess such hairs (all Schismatothelinae lack them as do most Psalmopoeinae genera). It is not clear whether the possession of urticating hairs was an ancestral trait of the clade, and has been lost in some species, or whether it represents multiple gains. Foley et al. suggested that the second hypothesis appeared to be better supported.

Other subfamilies that have been recognized include:

- Acanthopelminae – may be treated as synonymous with Ischnocolinae
- Selenogyrinae
- Spelopelminae – typically not accepted, Hemirrhagus being treated as Theraphosinae

== Genera ==
As of January 2026, this family includes 187 genera and 1,193 species:

- Abdomegaphobema Sherwood, Gabriel, Peñaherrera-R., Léon-E., Cisneros-Heredia, Brescovit & Lucas, 2023 – Costa Rica
- Acanthopelma F. O. Pickard-Cambridge, 1897 – Guyana
- Acanthoscurria Ausserer, 1871 – South America, Lesser Antilles
- Acentropelma Pocock, 1901 – Belize, Guatemala
- Aenigmarachne Schmidt, 2005 – Costa Rica, Colombia
- Agnostopelma Pérez-Miles & Weinmann, 2010 – Colombia
- Aguapanela Perafán & Cifuentes, 2015 – Colombia
- Amazonius Cifuentes & Bertani, 2022 – South America
- Annandaliella Hirst, 1909 – India
- Anoploscelus Pocock, 1897 – Eastern Africa
- Anqasha Sherwood & Gabriel, 2022 – Peru
- Antikuna Kaderka, Ferretti, West, Lüddecke & Hüsser, 2021 – Peru
- Antillena Bertani, Huff & Fukushima, 2017 – Dominican Rep
- Aphonopelma Pocock, 1901 – North America
- Arboriticus Borges & Bertani, 2025 – Brazil
- Aspinochilus Müller, Fardiansah, Schneider, Wanke, von Wirth & Wendt, 2024 – Indonesia
- Augacephalus Gallon, 2002 – Mozambique, Eswatini, Namibia, South Africa
- Avicularia Lamarck, 1818 – Trinidad and Tobago, Panama, South America
- Bacillochilus Gallon, 2010 – Angola
- Batesiella Pocock, 1903 – Cameroon
- Bermejoa Gabriel, Sherwood & Pérez-Miles, 2023 – Bolivia, Peru
- Birupes Gabriel & Sherwood, 2019 – Malaysia
- Bistriopelma Kaderka, 2015 – Peru
- Bonnetina Vol, 2000 – Mexico, Mexicoa
- Brachionopus Pocock, 1897 – South Africa
- Brachypelma Simon, 1891 – Mexico
- Bumba Pérez-Miles, Bonaldo & Miglio, 2014 – South America
- Cardiopelma Vol, 1999 – Unknown
- Caribena Fukushima & Bertani, 2017 – Cuba, Martinique, Puerto Rico, US Virgin Islands
- Caribothele Sherwood, Gabriel, Peñaherrera-R., Rollard, Leguin & Privet, 2025 – Caribbean, US Virgin Islands
- Catanduba Yamamoto, Lucas & Brescovit, 2012 – Brazil
- Catumiri Guadanucci, 2004 – South America
- Ceratogyrus Pocock, 1897 – Africa
- Chaetopelma Ausserer, 1871 – Cameroon, Egypt, Sudan, Western Asia, Cyprus, Greece
- Chilobrachys Karsch, 1892 – Asia
- Chilocosmia Schmidt & von Wirth, 1992 – Indonesia
- Chinchaysuyu Ferretti, Chaparro, Ochoa & West, 2023 – Peru
- Chromatopelma Schmidt, 1995 – Venezuela
- Cilantica Mirza, 2024 – India
- Citharacanthus Pocock, 1901 – Cuba, Hispaniola, Belize, Guatemala, Mexico
- Citharognathus Pocock, 1895 – Malaysia
- Clavopelma Chamberlin, 1940 – Mexico
- Colombiarachne Sherwood, Gabriel, Peñaherrera-R., Guerrero-Campoverde, León-E., Mora-Bolaños, Ríos-Tamayo & Cisneros-Heredia, 2025 – Colombia
- Coremiocnemis Simon, 1892 – Indonesia, Malaysia, Australia
- Cotztetlana Mendoza, 2012 – Mexico
- Crassicrus Reichling & West, 1996 – Belize, Guatemala, Mexico
- Crypsidromus Ausserer, 1871 – Costa Rica, Brazil
- Crypticarachne Peñaherrera-R., Sherwood, Gabriel, León-E., Rollard, Leguin, Brescovit & Lucas, 2025 – Ecuador
- Cubanana Ortiz, 2008 – Cuba
- Cyclosternum Ausserer, 1871 – Costa Rica, Panama, Mexico, South America
- Cymbiapophysa Gabriel & Sherwood, 2020 – Colombia, Ecuador, Peru
- Cyriocosmus Simon, 1903 – Trinidad and Tobago, South America
- Cyriopagopus Simon, 1887 – Asia
- Cyrtogrammomma Pocock, 1895 – Brazil, Guyana
- Cyrtopholis Simon, 1892 – North America, Antigua, Barthelemy, St, Thomas
- Davus O. Pickard-Cambridge, 1892 – North America
- Devicarina Peñaherrera-R., Sherwood, Gabriel, Léon-E., Rollard, Leguin, Brescovit & Lucas, 2025 – Brazil
- Dolichothele Mello-Leitão, 1923 – Bolivia, Brazil
- Dugesiella Pocock, 1901 – Mexico
- Encantarana Sherwood, Gabriel, Peñaherrera-R., Rollard, Leguin & Privet, 2025 – Puerto Rico
- Encyocratella Strand, 1907 – Tanzania
- Encyocrates Simon, 1892 – Madagascar
- Ephebopus Simon, 1892 – South America
- Euathlus Ausserer, 1875 – Argentina, Chile, Peru
- Eucratoscelus Pocock, 1898 – Kenya, Tanzania
- Eumenophorus Pocock, 1897 – Sierra Leone
- Eupalaestrus Pocock, 1901 – South America
- Euphrictus Hirst, 1908 – Cameroon, DR Congo
- Euthycaelus Simon, 1889 – Panama, Colombia, Peru, Venezuela
- Ewok Peñaherrera-R., Sherwood, Gabriel, León-E., Rollard, Leguin, Brescovit & Lucas, 2025 – Peru
- Grammostola Simon, 1892 – South America
- Guyruita Guadanucci, Lucas, Indicatti & Yamamoto, 2007 – Brazil, French Guiana
- Hapalopus Ausserer, 1875 – Panama, Colombia, Ecuador, Venezuela
- Hapalotremus Simon, 1903 – Argentina, Bolivia, Peru
- Haploclastus Simon, 1892 – India
- Haplocosmia Schmidt & von Wirth, 1996 – China, Nepal, Himalayas
- Harpactira Ausserer, 1871 – Namibia, South Africa
- Harpactirella Purcell, 1902 – South Africa
- Hemirrhagus Simon, 1903 – Mexico
- Heterophrictus Pocock, 1900 – India
- Heteroscodra Pocock, 1900 – Cameroon, Congo, Gabon, West
- Heterothele Karsch, 1879 – Central Africa, Tanzania, Nigeria
- Holothele Karsch, 1879 – Trinidad and Tobago, Panama, South America
- Homoeomma Ausserer, 1871 – South America
- Hysterocrates Simon, 1892 – Africa, Rep
- Idiothele Hewitt, 1919 – Mozambique, Southern Africa
- Iridopelma Pocock, 1901 – Brazil
- Ischnocolus Ausserer, 1871 – Africa, Western Asia, Italy, Spain, Brazil, Saudia Arabia, Tunesia
- Isiboroa Gabriel, Sherwood & Pérez-Miles, 2023 – Bolivia, Peru
- Jambu Miglio, Perafán & Pérez-Miles, 2024 – Brazil, Guyana
- Kankuamo Perafán, Galvis & Pérez-Miles, 2016 – Colombia
- Kochiana Fukushima, Nagahama & Bertani, 2008 – Brazil
- Lampropelma Simon, 1892 – Indonesia, Malaysia
- Lasiocyano Galleti-Lima, Hamilton, Borges & Guadanucci, 2023 – Brazil
- Lasiodora C. L. Koch, 1850 – Brazil
- Lasiodorides Schmidt & Bischoff, 1997 – Peru
- Longilyra Gabriel, 2014 – El Salvador
- Loxomphalia Simon, 1889 – Tanzania
- Loxoptygus Simon, 1903 – Ethiopia
- Luphocemus Denis, 1960- Morocco
- Lyrognathus Pocock, 1895 – Indonesia, Malaysia, India, Borneo
- Magnacarina Mendoza, Locht, Kaderka, Medina & Pérez-Miles, 2016 – Mexico
- Magnacrus Hoang, Yu, Wendt, West & von Wirth, 2025 – China? Vietnam
- Mascaraneus Gallon, 2005 – Mauritius
- Megaphobema Pocock, 1901 – South America
- Melognathus Chamberlin, 1917 – Philippines
- Metriopelma Becker, 1878 – Mexico
- Miaschistopus Pocock, 1897 – Venezuela
- Monocentropus Pocock, 1897 – Madagascar, Yemen
- Munduruku Miglio, Bonaldo & Pérez-MIles, 2013 – Brazil
- Murphyarachne Sherwood & Gabriel, 2022 – Peru
- Mygalarachne Ausserer, 1871 – Honduras
- Myostola Simon, 1903 – Cameroon, Gabon
- Neischnocolus Petrunkevitch, 1925 – Costa Rica, Panama, South America
- Neoheterophrictus Siliwal & Raven, 2012 – India
- Neoholothele Guadanucci & Weinmann, 2015 – Trinidad and Tobago, Colombia, Venezuela
- Neostenotarsus Pribik & Weinmann, 2004 – French Guiana, Guyana
- Nesiergus Simon, 1903 – Seychelles
- Nesipelma Schmidt & Kovařík, 1996 – Nevis, St. Kitts
- Nhandu Lucas, 1983 – Brazil, Paraguay
- Notahapalopus Sherwood, Gabriel, Peñaherrera-R., Osorio, Benavides, Hörweg, Brescovit & Lucas, 2024 – Bolivia, Brazil, French Guiana
- Omothymus Thorell, 1891 – Southeast Asia
- Ornithoctonus Pocock, 1892 – Myanmar, Thailand
- Orphnaecus Simon, 1892 – Philippines
- Ozopactus Simon, 1889 – Venezuela
- Pachistopelma Pocock, 1901 – Brazil
- Pamphobeteus Pocock, 1901 – Panama, South America
- Parvicarina Galleti-Lima, Hamilton, Borges & Guadanucci, 2023 – Brazil
- Pelinobius Karsch, 1885 – Kenya, Tanzania
- Phlogiellus Pocock, 1897 – Asia, Papua New Guinea, Solomon Islands, Borneo
- Phlogiodes Pocock, 1899 – India
- Phoneyusa Karsch, 1884 – Central Africa, Madagascar, Guinea-Bissau, Central African Rep, West Africa, West
- Phormictopus Pocock, 1901 – Cuba, Hispaniola, United States, Argentina, Brazil, Caribbean to Brazil, probably Hispaniola
- Phormingochilus Pocock, 1895 – Indonesia, Malaysia, Borneo
- Phrixotrichus Simon, 1889 – Argentina, Chile
- Plesiopelma Pocock, 1901 – South America
- Plesiophrictus Pocock, 1899 – India, Sri Lanka
- Poecilotheria Simon, 1885 – India, Sri Lanka
- Psalistops Simon, 1889 – Colombia, Venezuela
- Psalmopoeus Pocock, 1895 – North America, South America
- Psednocnemis West, Nunn & Hogg, 2012 – Indonesia, Malaysia
- Pseudhapalopus Strand, 1907 – Bolivia
- Pseudoschizopelma Smith, 1995 – Mexico
- Pterinochilus Pocock, 1897 – Africa
- Pterinopelma Pocock, 1901 – Argentina, Brazil
- Pululahua Dupérré & Tapia, 2025 – Ecuador
- Reichlingia Rudloff, 2001 – Belize
- Reversopelma Schmidt, 2001 – Ecuador, Peru
- Romopelma Peñaherrera-R., Pinos-Sanchez, Guerrero-Campoverde, León-E. & Cisneros-Heredia, 2024 – Ecuador
- Sahydroaraneus Mirza & Sanap, 2014 – India
- Sandinista Longhorn & Gabriel, 2019 – Costa Rica, Nicaragua
- Satyrex Zamani & von Wirth, 2025 – Somalia, Oman, Saudi Arabia, Yemen
- Schismatothele Karsch, 1879 – Trinidad and Tobago, South America
- Schizopelma F. O. Pickard-Cambridge, 1897 – Mexico
- Scopelobates Simon, 1903 – Dominican Republic
- Selenobrachys Schmidt, 1999 – Philippines
- Selenocosmia Ausserer, 1871 – Asia, Australia, New Guinea, Papua New Guinea
- Selenogyrus Pocock, 1897 – Guinea, Ivory Coast, Sierra Leone
- Selenotholus Hogg, 1902 – Australia
- Selenotypus Pocock, 1895 – Australia
- Sericopelma Ausserer, 1875 – Costa Rica, Panama, Mexico, Brazil
- Sickius Soares & Camargo, 1948 – Brazil
- Sphaerobothria Karsch, 1879 – Costa Rica, Panama
- Spinosatibiapalpus Gabriel & Sherwood, 2020 – Trinidad, Trinidad and Tobago, Panama, Colombia, Peru
- Stichoplastoris Rudloff, 1997 – Central America
- Stromatopelma Karsch, 1881 – Africa, West Africa
- Taksinus Songsangchote, Sippawat, Khaikaew & Chomphuphuang, 2022 – Thailand
- Tandayarachne Peñaherrera-R. & Guayasamin, 2025 – Colombia, Ecuador
- Tapinauchenius Ausserer, 1871 – St. Vincent, Trinidad and Tobago, Panama, South America, Lesser Antilles
- Tekoapora Galleti-Lima, Hamilton, Borges & Guadanucci, 2023 – Brazil
- Thalerommata Ausserer, 1875 – Bahamas, Cuba, Jamaica, South America
- Theraphosa Walckenaer, 1805 – South America
- Thrigmopoeus Pocock, 1899 – India
- Thrixopelma Schmidt, 1994 – Ecuador, Peru
- Tliltocatl Mendoza & Francke, 2020 – Belize, Costa Rica, Guatemala, Mexico
- Tmesiphantes Simon, 1892 – Argentina, Brazil, Peru
- Trichognathella Gallon, 2004 – South Africa
- Trichopelma Simon, 1888 – North America, Brazil, Venezuela, St. Vincent and the Grenadines, US Virgin Is
- Typhochlaena C. L. Koch, 1850 – Brazil
- Umbyquyra Gargiulo, Brescovit & Lucas, 2018 – Bolivia, Brazil
- Urupelma Kaderka, Lüddecke, Řezáč, Řezáčová & Hüsser, 2023 – Peru
- Vitalius Lucas, Silva & Bertani, 1993 – Argentina, Brazil
- Vitriemboli Peñaherrera-R., Ríos-Tamayo, Sherwood, Gabriel, Guerrero-Campoverde, León-E., Mora-Bolaños & Cisneros-Heredia, 2025 – Argentina, Bolivia
- Warmiru Peñaherrera-R., Sherwood, Gabriel, León-E., Rollard, Leguin, Brescovit & Lucas, 2025 – Ecuador, Peru
- Xenesthis Simon, 1891 – Colombia? Venezuela
- Yanomamius Bertani & Almeida, 2021 – Brazil, Venezuela
- Ybyrapora Fukushima & Bertani, 2017 – Brazil

Former genera:

- Ami Pérez-Miles, 2008 → Neischnocolus
- Barropelma Chamberlin, 1940 → Neischnocolus
- Eurypelmella Strand, 1907, nomen dubium
- Magulla Simon, 1892 → Tmesiphantes
- Melloleitaoina Gerschman & Schiapelli, 1960 → Tmesiphantes

== Fossil record ==
Fossils of mygalomorph infraorder date back to the Triassic period. One species assigned to the Theraphosidae is Protertheraphosa spinipes, found in Burmese amber, which is dated to the mid and late Cretaceous period.

== See also ==
- Cultural depictions of spiders
- Guangxitoxin
- Spider bite
- Spider taxonomy
- Tarantula Fest
