= Agnostopelma =

Scientific classification
- Kingdom: Animalia
- Phylum: Arthropoda
- Subphylum: Chelicerata
- Class: Arachnida
- Order: Araneae
- Infraorder: Mygalomorphae
- Family: Theraphosidae
- Genus: Agnostopelma; Pérez-Miles & Weinmann, 2010

Type species
- A. tota Pérez-Miles & Weinmann, 2010

Species
- See text.

Genus of spiders

Agnostopelma is a genus of Colombian tarantulas that was first described by F. Pérez-Miles & D. Weinmann in 2010. As of December 2019 it contains two species, found in Colombia: Agnostopelma gardel and Agnostopelma tota.

== Species ==
- Agnostopelma gardel Pérez-Miles & Weinmann, 2010 – Colombia
- Agnostopelma tota Pérez-Miles & Weinmann, 2010 – Colombia
