= Ozopactus =

Scientific classification
- Kingdom: Animalia
- Phylum: Arthropoda
- Subphylum: Chelicerata
- Class: Arachnida
- Order: Araneae
- Infraorder: Mygalomorphae
- Family: Theraphosidae
- Genus: Ozopactus; Simon, 1889
- Species: O. ernsti

Binomial name
- Ozopactus ernsti Simon, 1889

Genus of spiders

Ozopactus is a monotypic genus of Venezuelan tarantula, containing the single species Ozopactus ernsti. It was first described by Eugène Louis Simon in 1889. It has an enlarged sternum and maxillae, with the front of the ocularium no longer than the back.
