= Clavopelma =

Scientific classification
- Kingdom: Animalia
- Phylum: Arthropoda
- Subphylum: Chelicerata
- Class: Arachnida
- Order: Araneae
- Infraorder: Mygalomorphae
- Family: Theraphosidae
- Genus: Clavopelma; Chamberlin, 1940
- Species: C. tamaulipeca

Binomial name
- Clavopelma tamaulipeca (Chamberlin, 1937)

Genus of spiders

Clavopelma is a monotypic genus of Mexican tarantulas containing the single species, Clavopelma tamaulipeca. It is a reddish-brown spider with thick, wooly golden-brown hair. Its legs are a darker shade of brown than the carapace, with setae that are stiffer than the hair on its body. Both sets of eyes are more or less equal in length, though the forward set is sharply procurved.

The genus was first described by Ralph Vary Chamberlin in 1940, but the species was described three years earlier under the name Eurypelma tamaulipeca.
