= Nesipelma =

Scientific classification
- Kingdom: Animalia
- Phylum: Arthropoda
- Subphylum: Chelicerata
- Class: Arachnida
- Order: Araneae
- Infraorder: Mygalomorphae
- Family: Theraphosidae
- Genus: Nesipelma; Schmidt & Kovařík, 1996

Species
- Nesipelma insulare Schmidt & Kovařík, 1996 - St. Kitts and Nevis; Nesipelma medium (Chamberlin, 1917) - St. Kitts and Nevis

Genus of spiders

Nesipelma is a genus of tarantulas containing the two species, Nesipelma insulare and Nesipelma medium . It was first described by Günter E. W. Schmidt & F. Kovařík in 1996, and is found in Nevis and on the Lesser Antilles.
