= Kochiana =

Scientific classification
- Kingdom: Animalia
- Phylum: Arthropoda
- Subphylum: Chelicerata
- Class: Arachnida
- Order: Araneae
- Infraorder: Mygalomorphae
- Family: Theraphosidae
- Genus: Kochiana; Fukushima, Nagahama & Bertani, 2008
- Species: K. brunnipes

Binomial name
- Kochiana brunnipes (C. L. Koch, 1841)

Genus of spiders

Kochiana is a monotypic genus of Brazilian tarantulas containing the single species, Kochiana brunnipes or the dwarf pink leg. It was first described by C. L. Koch in 1841 under the name "Mygale brunnipes", and was transferred to its own genus in 2008. As of April 2020, it has only been found in Brazil.

== Description ==
They have black cephalothoraxes and abdomens with golden urticating hairs. The coxae, trochanters and femurs are also black, but the patellae, tibiae, metatarsi, and tarsi are reddish light brown.

K. brunnipes males differ from others in the Theraphosinae subfamily by having a long and downwards pointing embolus with prolateral accessory keels, and by the ability of the first metatarsus to fold between the two branches of the tibial spur.
