= Yanomamius =

Scientific classification
- Kingdom: Animalia
- Phylum: Arthropoda
- Subphylum: Chelicerata
- Class: Arachnida
- Order: Araneae
- Infraorder: Mygalomorphae
- Family: Theraphosidae
- Genus: Yanomamius; Bertani & Almeida, 2021

Type species
- Y. franciscoi Bertani & Almeida, 2021

Species
- 4, see text

Genus of tarantulas

Yanomamius is a genus of South American tarantulas first erected by Rogério Bertani and M. Q. Almeida in 2021 for two newly discovered species and one previously described species from Brazil. In one of Bertani's prior studies, he investigated a tarantula collected by the Yanomami as a source of food. Based on the limited material available for study (two adult females and one immature spider) the species was placed into Holothele. The next year, it was moved to newly erected genus Guyruita due, in part, to the multi-lobed shape of its spermathecae. When the first male was found and described, the diagnostic characteristics didn't match that of Holothele or Guyruita, so a new genus was erected for Y. waikoshiemi and three other closely related species.

== Species ==
As of April 2022 it contains four species:

- Y. franciscoi Bertani & Almeida, 2021 (type) – Brazil
- Y. neblina Bertani & Almeida, 2021 – Brazil
- Y. raonii Bertani & Almeida, 2021 – Brazil
- Y. waikoshiemi (Bertani & Araújo, 2006) – Venezuela

== See also ==
- Guyruita
- Holothele
