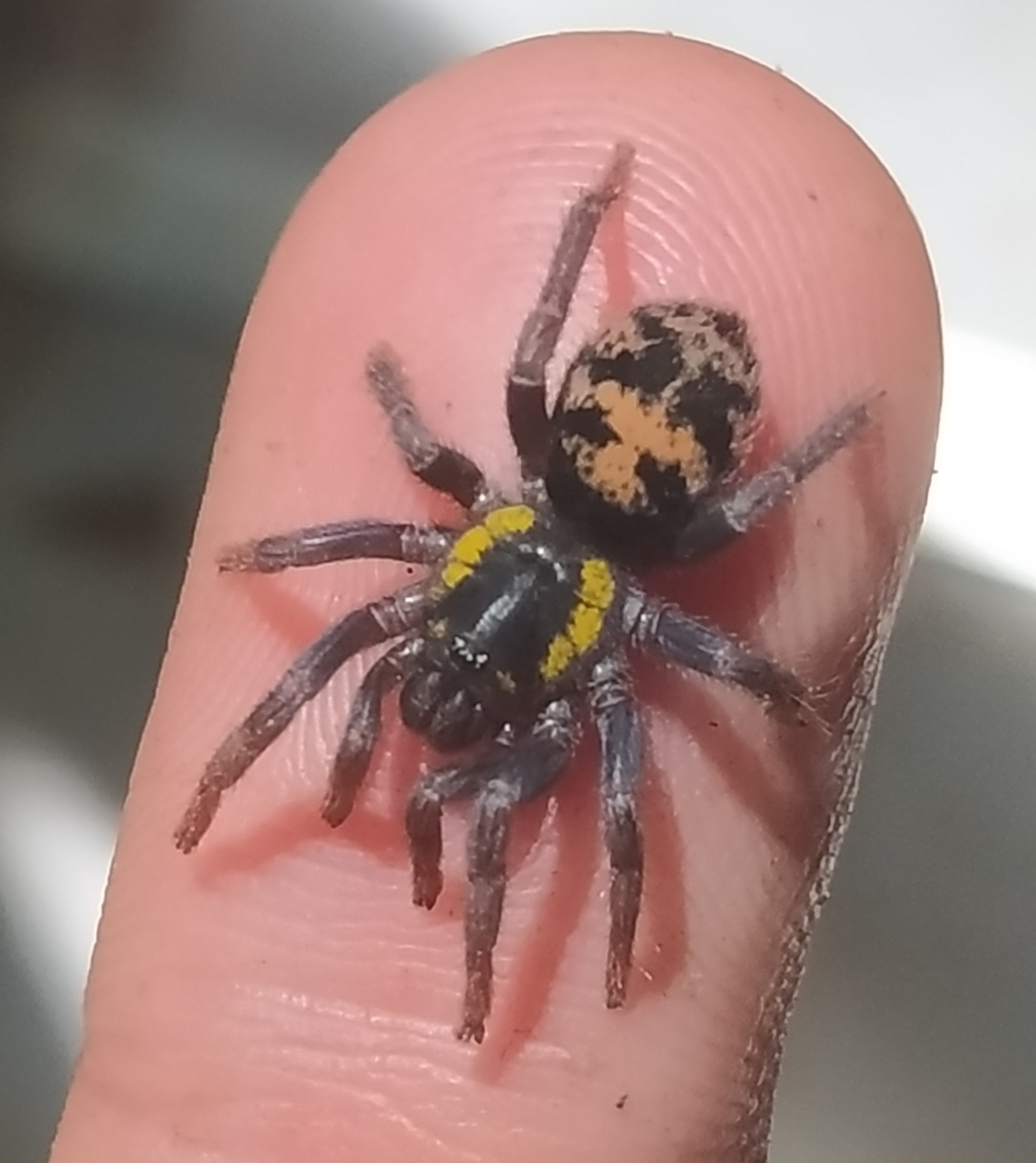
- J. butantan from Manaus, Brazil

Scientific classification
- Kingdom: Animalia
- Phylum: Arthropoda
- Subphylum: Chelicerata
- Class: Arachnida
- Order: Araneae
- Infraorder: Mygalomorphae
- Family: Theraphosidae
- Genus: Jambu; Miglio, Perafán & Pérez-Miles, 2024

Type species
- J. paru Miglio, Perafán & Pérez-Miles, 2024

Species
- 5, see text

= Jambu (spider) =

Genus of spiders

Jambu is a genus of South American tarantulas in the family Theraphosidae.

== Distribution ==
Four of the five described species are endemic to Brazil, with J. lesleyae endemic to Guyana.

== Species ==
As of October 2025, this genus includes five species:

- Jambu butantan (Pérez-Miles, 1998) – Brazil
- Jambu lesleyae (Gabriel, 2011) – Guyana
- Jambu manoa Miglio, Perafán & Pérez-Miles, 2024 – Brazil
- Jambu paru Miglio, Perafán & Pérez-Miles, 2024 – Brazil (type species)
- Jambu yanomami Santos, Almeida, de Morais & Bertani, 2025 – Brazil
