= Aspinochilus =

Scientific classification
- Kingdom: Animalia
- Phylum: Arthropoda
- Subphylum: Chelicerata
- Class: Arachnida
- Order: Araneae
- Infraorder: Mygalomorphae
- Family: Theraphosidae
- Genus: Aspinochilus; Müller, Fardiansah, Schneider, Wanke, von Wirth & Wendt, 2024
- Species: A. rufus

Binomial name
- Aspinochilus rufus Müller, Fardiansah, Schneider, Wanke, von Wirth & Wendt, 2024

Species of spider

Aspinochilus is a monotypic genus of spiders in the family Theraphosidae containing the single species, Aspinochilus rufus.

== Distribution ==
Aspinochilus rufus has only been recorded from Java in Indonesia.
