= Tandayarachne =

Scientific classification
- Kingdom: Animalia
- Phylum: Arthropoda
- Subphylum: Chelicerata
- Class: Arachnida
- Order: Araneae
- Infraorder: Mygalomorphae
- Family: Theraphosidae
- Genus: Tandayarachne; Peñaherrera-R. & Guayasamin, 2025

Type species
- T. sherwoodae Peñaherrera-R. & Guayasamin, 2025

Species
- 2, see text

Genus of spiders

Tandayarachne is a genus of spiders in the family Theraphosidae.

== Distribution ==
Tandayarachne is found in Colombia and Ecuador.

== Etymology ==
The genus name is a combination of Tandayapa Cloud Forest Station, the type location in the Alambi river basin in Pichincha Province, Ecuador, and Ancient Greek arachne "spider". T. sherwoodae honors UK arachnologist Danniella Sherwood.

== Species ==
As of January 2026, this genus includes two species:

- Tandayarachne pijaos (Jimenez & Bertani, 2008) – Colombia
- Tandayarachne sherwoodae Peñaherrera-R. & Guayasamin, 2025 – Ecuador
