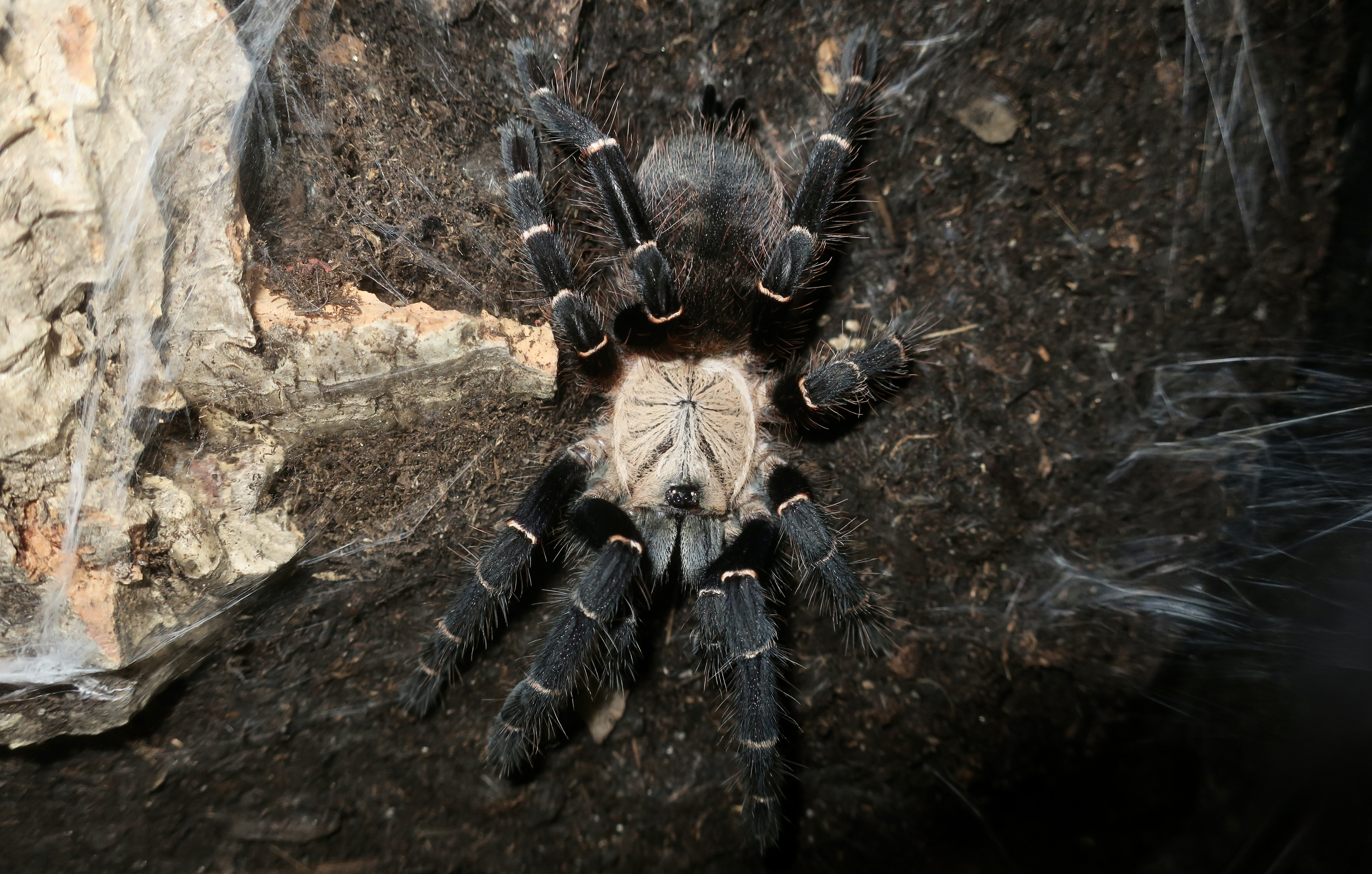

Scientific classification
- Kingdom: Animalia
- Phylum: Arthropoda
- Subphylum: Chelicerata
- Class: Arachnida
- Order: Araneae
- Infraorder: Mygalomorphae
- Family: Theraphosidae
- Genus: Taksinus; Songsangchote, Sippawat, Khaikaew & Chomphuphuang, 2022
- Species: T. bambus

Binomial name
- Taksinus bambus Songsangchote, Sippawat, Khaikaew & Chomphuphuang, 2022

= Taksinus =

Genus of spiders

Taksinus is a genus of tarantula. The genus contains the single species Taksinus bambus. The tarantula specialises in living in the culm of bamboo of the genus Gigantochloa. It is found in the Mueang Tak District of Thailand. It was discovered by YouTuber JoCho Sippawat, arachnologist Narin Chomphuphuang, and arachnologist Chaowalit Songsangchote. The genus is named after the Thai king Taksin the Great.

== Description ==
Taksinus has a low caput and a clypeus that is less than a width of the median ocular quadrangle and a spermathecae with twin seminal receptacles. The genus has a lack of incrassate tibia and metatarsus. The genus also has a lack of a dense brush of hair on the retrolateral side of the femora of the front limbs. Males lack apical embolus swelling.
