= Warmiru =

Scientific classification
- Kingdom: Animalia
- Phylum: Arthropoda
- Subphylum: Chelicerata
- Class: Arachnida
- Order: Araneae
- Infraorder: Mygalomorphae
- Family: Theraphosidae
- Genus: Warmiru; Peñaherrera-R., Sherwood, Gabriel, León-E., Rollard, Leguin, Brescovit & Lucas, 2025

Type species
- Lasiodorides longicolli Schmidt, 2003

Species
- 2, see text

Genus of spiders

Warmiru is a genus of spiders in the family Theraphosidae.

== Distribution ==
Warmiru is endemic to the northwestern part of South America, with both species occurring in Peru and one species also found in Ecuador.

== Etymology ==
The genus name combines the Quechua words warmi "woman" and uru "spider", dedicating this genus to all female arachnologists.

== Species ==
As of January 2026, this genus includes two species:

- Warmiru lagunas (Schmidt & Rudloff, 2010) – Peru
- Warmiru longicolli (Schmidt, 2003) – Ecuador, Peru
