= Mygalarachne =

Scientific classification
- Kingdom: Animalia
- Phylum: Arthropoda
- Subphylum: Chelicerata
- Class: Arachnida
- Order: Araneae
- Infraorder: Mygalomorphae
- Family: Theraphosidae
- Genus: Mygalarachne; Ausserer, 1871
- Species: M. brevipes

Binomial name
- Mygalarachne brevipes Ausserer, 1871

Genus of spiders

Mygalarachne is a monotypic genus of Honduran tarantulas containing the single species, Mygalarachne brevipes. It was first described by Anton Ausserer in 1871, and is found in Honduras.
