= Bermejoa =

Scientific classification
- Kingdom: Animalia
- Phylum: Arthropoda
- Subphylum: Chelicerata
- Class: Arachnida
- Order: Araneae
- Infraorder: Mygalomorphae
- Family: Theraphosidae
- Genus: Bermejoa; Gabriel, Sherwood & Pérez-Miles, 2023
- Species: B. zoeae

Binomial name
- Bermejoa zoeae Gabriel, Sherwood & Pérez-Miles, 2023

Genus of tarantulas

Bermejoa is a monotypic genus of tarantula, first described by Gabriel, Sherwood and Pérez-Miles in 2023. Bermejoa zoeae its only known species, is found in Bolivia. The name Bermejoa comes from Bermejo which is the name of a nearby town and the name of the river that is close to the type locality. This is part of the Dry Chaco region, this species in particular being found in a semi-decious forest, at an elevation of roughly 1000m above sea level. The species epithet is a matronym in honour of Zoë Simmons, who is one of the collectors of the specimen.
