= Stichoplastoris =

Scientific classification
- Kingdom: Animalia
- Phylum: Arthropoda
- Subphylum: Chelicerata
- Class: Arachnida
- Order: Araneae
- Infraorder: Mygalomorphae
- Family: Theraphosidae
- Genus: Stichoplastoris; Rudloff, 1997

Type species
- S. obelix (Valerio, 1980)

Species
- 8, see text

Genus of spiders

Stichoplastoris is a genus of Central American tarantulas that was first described by J.-P. Rudloff in 1997.

== Species ==
As of May 2020 it contains eight species, found in Panama, Belize, Costa Rica, and El Salvador:

- Stichoplastoris angustatus (Kraus, 1955) – El Salvador
- Stichoplastoris asterix (Valerio, 1980) – Costa Rica
- Stichoplastoris denticulatus (Valerio, 1980) – Costa Rica
- Stichoplastoris elusinus (Valerio, 1980) – Costa Rica
- Stichoplastoris longistylus (Kraus, 1955) – El Salvador
- Stichoplastoris obelix (Valerio, 1980) (type) – Belize, Costa Rica
- Stichoplastoris schusterae (Kraus, 1955) – El Salvador
- Stichoplastoris stylipus (Valerio, 1982) – Costa Rica, Panama
