= Magnacarina =

Scientific classification
- Kingdom: Animalia
- Phylum: Arthropoda
- Subphylum: Chelicerata
- Class: Arachnida
- Order: Araneae
- Infraorder: Mygalomorphae
- Family: Theraphosidae
- Genus: Magnacarina; Mendoza et al., 2016

Type species
- Hapalopus aldanus West, 2000

Species
- Magnacarina aldana (West, 2000); Magnacarina cancer Mendoza & Locht, 2016; Magnacarina moderata Locht, Mendoza & Medina, 2016; Magnacarina primaverensis Mendoza & Locht, 2016

Genus of spiders

Magnacarina is a genus of spiders in the family Theraphosidae. It was first described in 2016 by Mendoza, Locht, Kaderka, Medina & Pérez-Miles. As of 2017, it contains 4 species.
