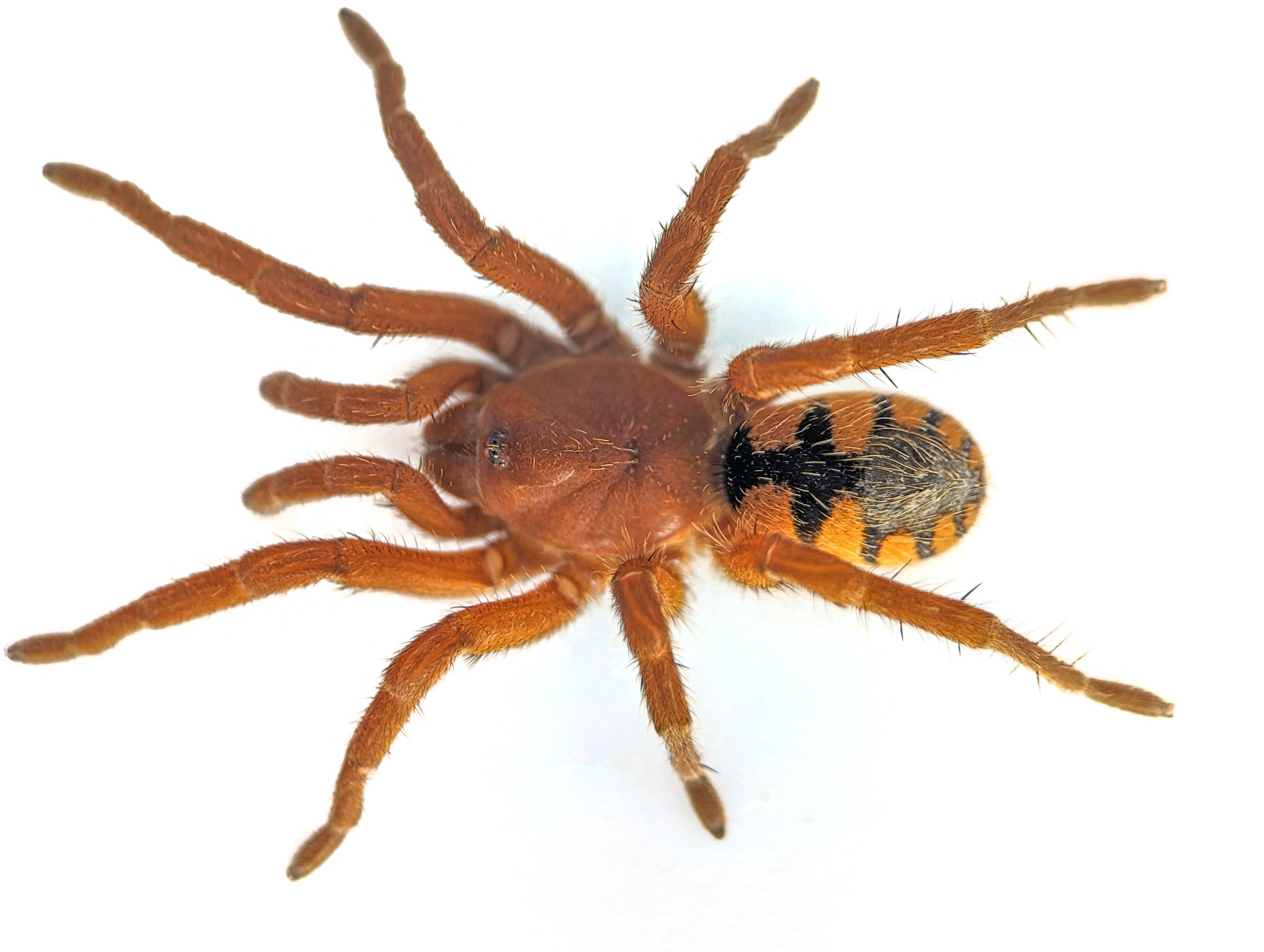
- female D. guidonae
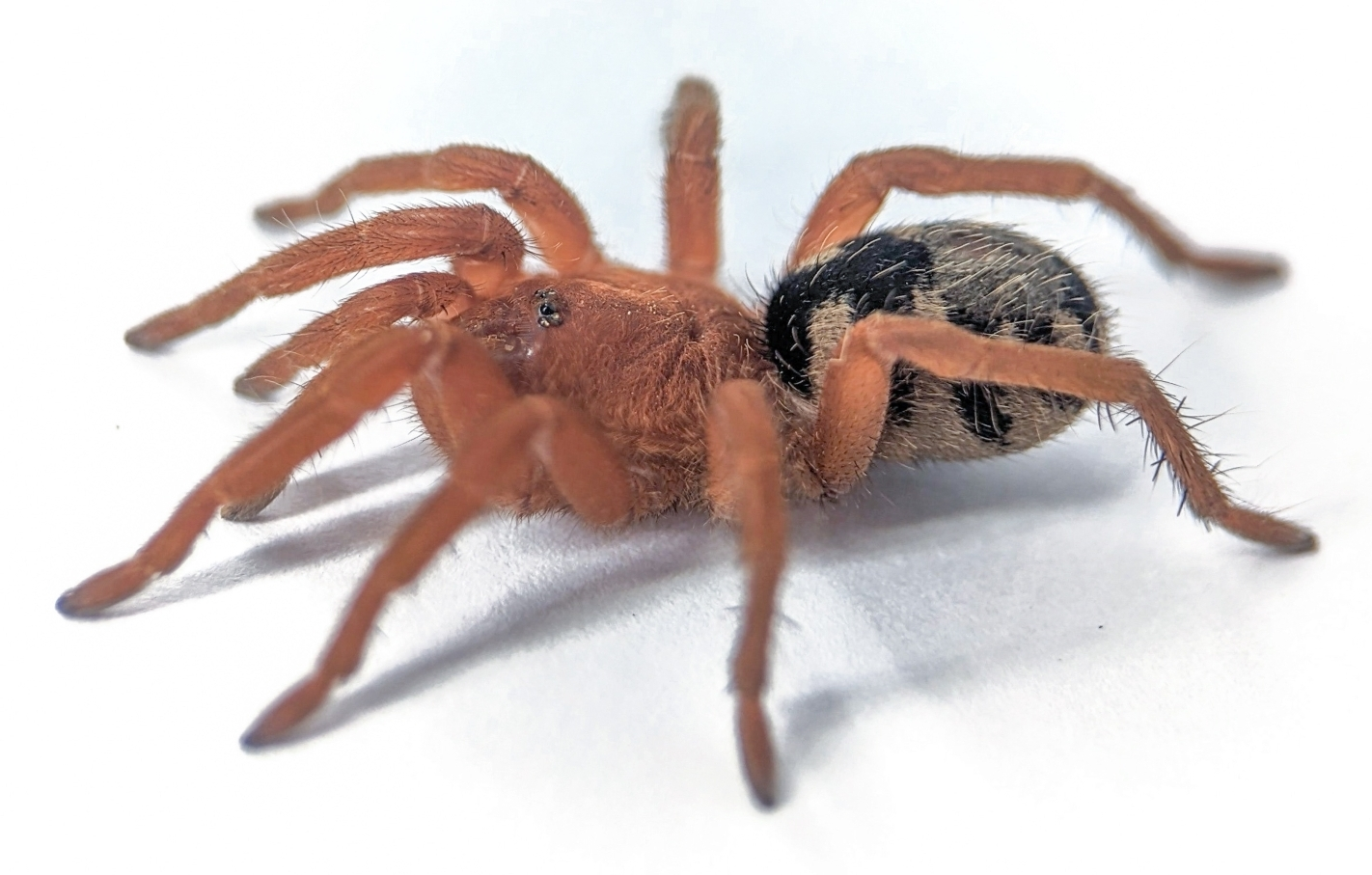
- juvenile D. guidonae

Scientific classification
- Kingdom: Animalia
- Phylum: Arthropoda
- Subphylum: Chelicerata
- Class: Arachnida
- Order: Araneae
- Infraorder: Mygalomorphae
- Family: Theraphosidae
- Genus: Devicarina; Peñaherrera-R., Sherwood, Gabriel, Léon-E., Rollard, Leguin, Brescovit & Lucas, 2025

Type species
- Hapalopus akroa Moeller, Galleti-Lima & Guadanucci, 2024

Species
- 2, see text

= Devicarina =

Genus of spiders

Devicarina is a genus of spiders in the family Theraphosidae.

== Distribution ==
The genus Devicarina is endemic to Brazil.

== Etymology ==
The genus name is a combination of Latin devius "inconsistent" and carina "keel", referring to the morphology of this genus' palpal bulb, which is strongly different from related genus Hapalopus.

D. akroa honors the Akroá people. D. guidonae is named after French-Brazilian archaeologist Niède Guidon (1933–2025).

== Species ==
As of January 2026, this genus includes two species:

- Devicarina akroa (Moeller, Galleti-Lima & Guadanucci, 2024) – Brazil
- Devicarina guidonae (Moeller, Galleti-Lima & Guadanucci, 2024) – Brazil
