= Pululahua (spider) =

Scientific classification
- Kingdom: Animalia
- Phylum: Arthropoda
- Subphylum: Chelicerata
- Class: Arachnida
- Order: Araneae
- Infraorder: Mygalomorphae
- Family: Theraphosidae
- Genus: Pululahua; Dupérré & Tapia, 2025

Type species
- P. kunukyaku Dupérré & Tapia, 2025

Species
- 2, see text

Genus of spiders

Pululahua is a genus of spiders in the family Theraphosidae.

== Distribution ==
The genus Pululahua is endemic to Ecuador.

== Species ==
As of January 2026, this genus includes two species:

- Pululahua kunukyaku Dupérré & Tapia, 2025 – Ecuador
- Pululahua winku Dupérré & Tapia, 2025 – Ecuador
