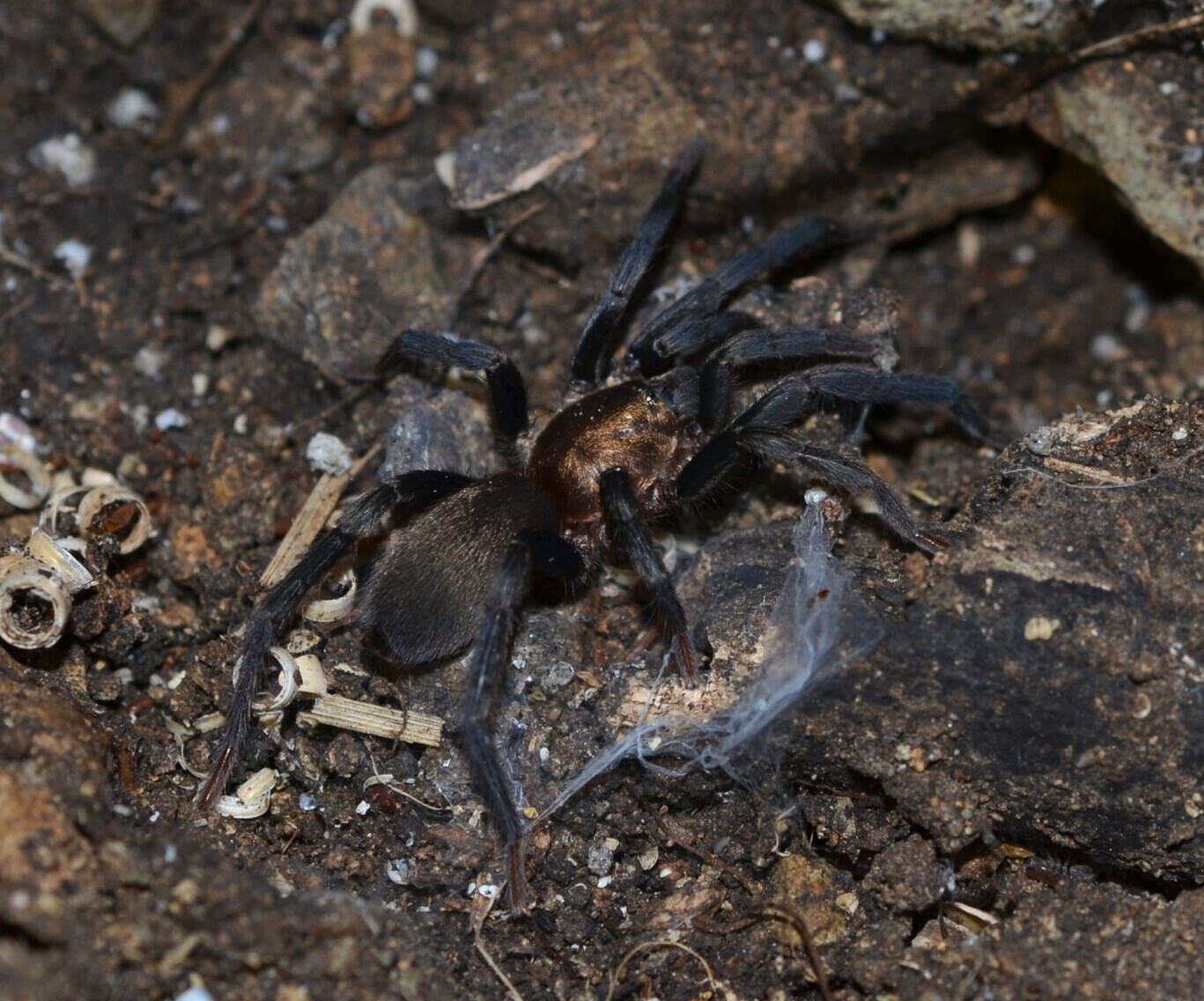
- C. shoemakeri in Virgin Islands
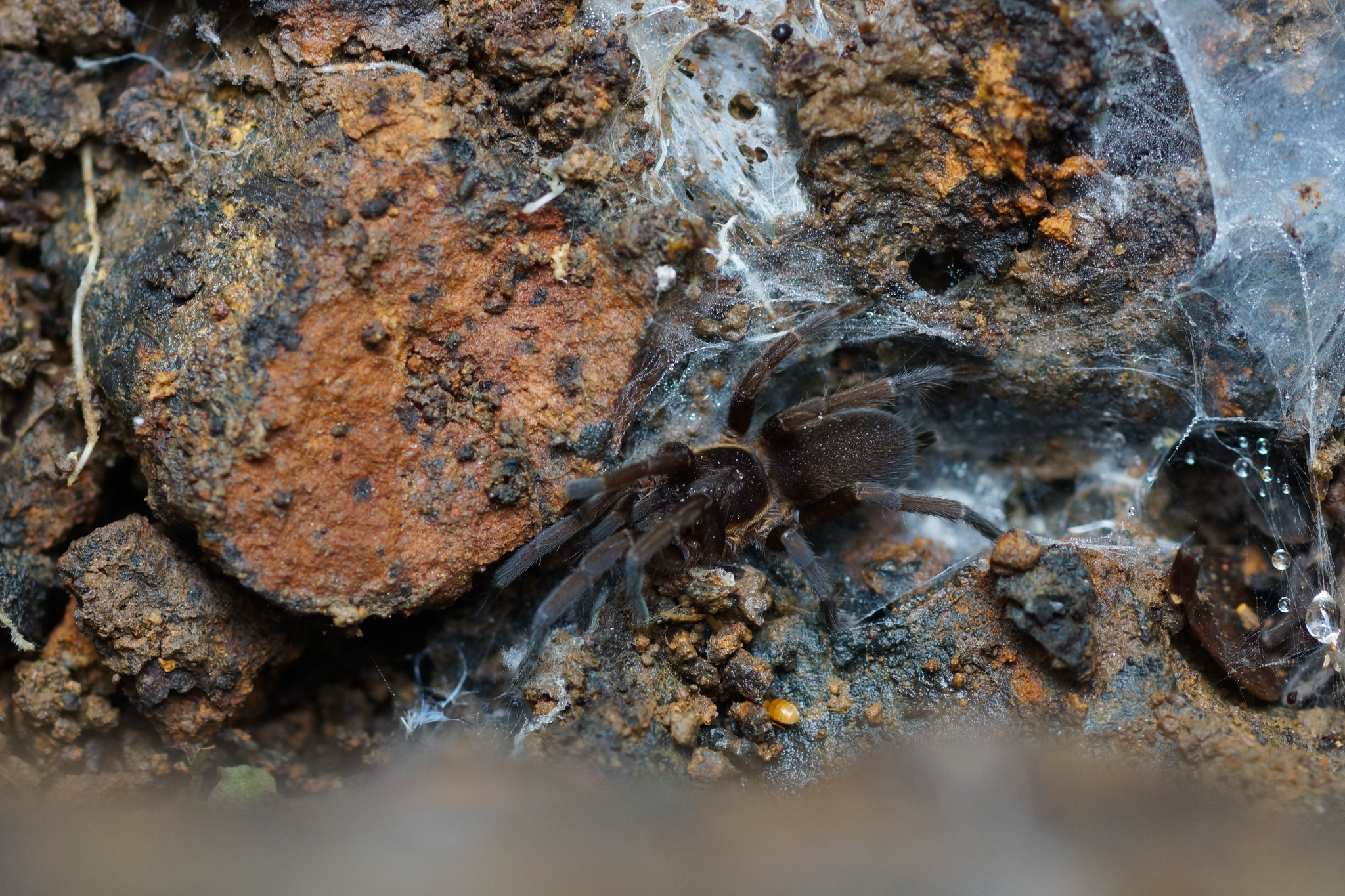
- C. culebrae in Puerto Rico

Scientific classification
- Kingdom: Animalia
- Phylum: Arthropoda
- Subphylum: Chelicerata
- Class: Arachnida
- Order: Araneae
- Infraorder: Mygalomorphae
- Family: Theraphosidae
- Subfamily: Ischnocolinae
- Genus: Caribothele; Sherwood, Gabriel, Peñaherrera-R., Rollard, Leguin & Privet, 2025

Type species
- Ischnocolus culebrae Petrunkevitch, 1929

Species
- 5, see text

= Caribothele =

Genus of spiders

Caribothele is a genus of spiders in the family Theraphosidae (tarantulas).

This genus most closely resembles Holothele, with many of the current species transferred from the latter genus.

== Etymology ==
The genus name combines "Caribbean" and Holothele.

== Distribution ==
Caribothele is endemic to the Caribbean, with species distributed across Puerto Rico, Cuba, the Dominican Republic, the US Virgin Islands, and Guadeloupe.

== Species ==
As of January 2026, this genus includes five species:

- Caribothele culebrae (Petrunkevitch, 1929) – Puerto Rico
- Caribothele denticulata (Franganillo, 1930) – Cuba
- Caribothele maddeni (Esposito & Agnarsson, 2014) – Dominican Republic
- Caribothele shoemakeri (Petrunkevitch, 1926) – US Virgin Islands (St. Thomas)
- Caribothele sulfurensis (Maréchal, 2005) – Guadeloupe
