= Arboriticus =

Scientific classification
- Kingdom: Animalia
- Phylum: Arthropoda
- Subphylum: Chelicerata
- Class: Arachnida
- Order: Araneae
- Infraorder: Mygalomorphae
- Family: Theraphosidae
- Genus: Arboriticus; Borges & Bertani, 2025

Type species
- A. celsoi Borges & Bertani, 2025

Species
- 7, see text

Genus of spiders

Arboriticus is a genus of spiders in the family Theraphosidae.

== Distribution and Habitat ==
Arboriticus is endemic to Brazil, with all seven described species occurring exclusively within this country.

The genus is noted for having an arboreal habitat, which is unusual among Theraphosines due to their large size, many species of the genus were discovered in deforested tree trunks and cavities. Their arboreal habitat and close proximity to human deforestation, along with the relativity few collected specimens has raised concerns on the conservation status of the genus as a whole.

== Taxonomy ==
The genus includes two species formerly included in Eupalaestrus.

== Species ==
As of October 2025, this genus includes seven species:

- Arboriticus celsoi Borges & Bertani, 2025 (type species)
- Arboriticus giganteus Borges & Bertani, 2025
- Arboriticus maculatus Borges, Abegg & Bertani, 2025
- Arboriticus minor Borges & Bertani, 2025
- Arboriticus petropolis Borges & Bertani, 2025
- Arboriticus spinosissimus (Mello-Leitão, 1923)
- Arboriticus tarsicrassus (Bücherl, 1947)
