= Eurypelmella =

Disputed name for a genus of spiders

Eurypelmella is a nomen dubium (doubtful name) for a genus of spiders in the family Theraphosidae. It has been regarded as a synonym for Schizopelma, but this was disputed in 2016.
