= Cubanana =

Scientific classification
- Kingdom: Animalia
- Phylum: Arthropoda
- Subphylum: Chelicerata
- Class: Arachnida
- Order: Araneae
- Infraorder: Mygalomorphae
- Family: Theraphosidae
- Genus: Cubanana; Ortiz, 2008
- Species: C. cristinae

Binomial name
- Cubanana cristinae Ortiz, 2008

Genus of spiders

Cubanana is a monotypic genus of tarantulas containing the single species, Cubanana cristinae. It was first described by D. Ortiz in 2008, and is endemic to Cuba, occurring in the east of the island.
