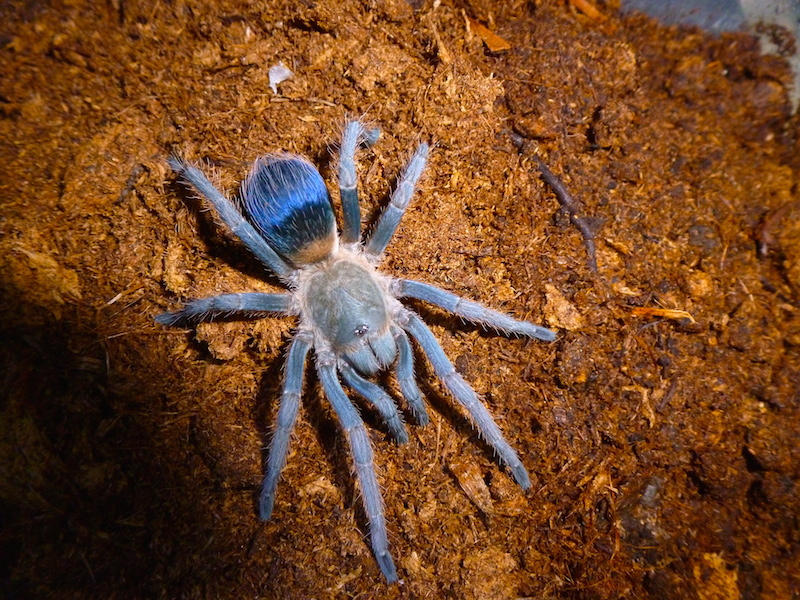

Scientific classification
- Kingdom: Animalia
- Phylum: Arthropoda
- Subphylum: Chelicerata
- Class: Arachnida
- Order: Araneae
- Infraorder: Mygalomorphae
- Family: Theraphosidae
- Genus: Pseudhapalopus; Strand, 1907
- Species: P. aculeatus

Binomial name
- Pseudhapalopus aculeatus Strand, 1907

= Pseudhapalopus =

Genus of spiders

Pseudhapalopus is a monotypic genus of Bolivian tarantulas containing the single species, Pseudhapalopus aculeatus. It was first described by Embrik Strand in 1907, and is found in Bolivia.
