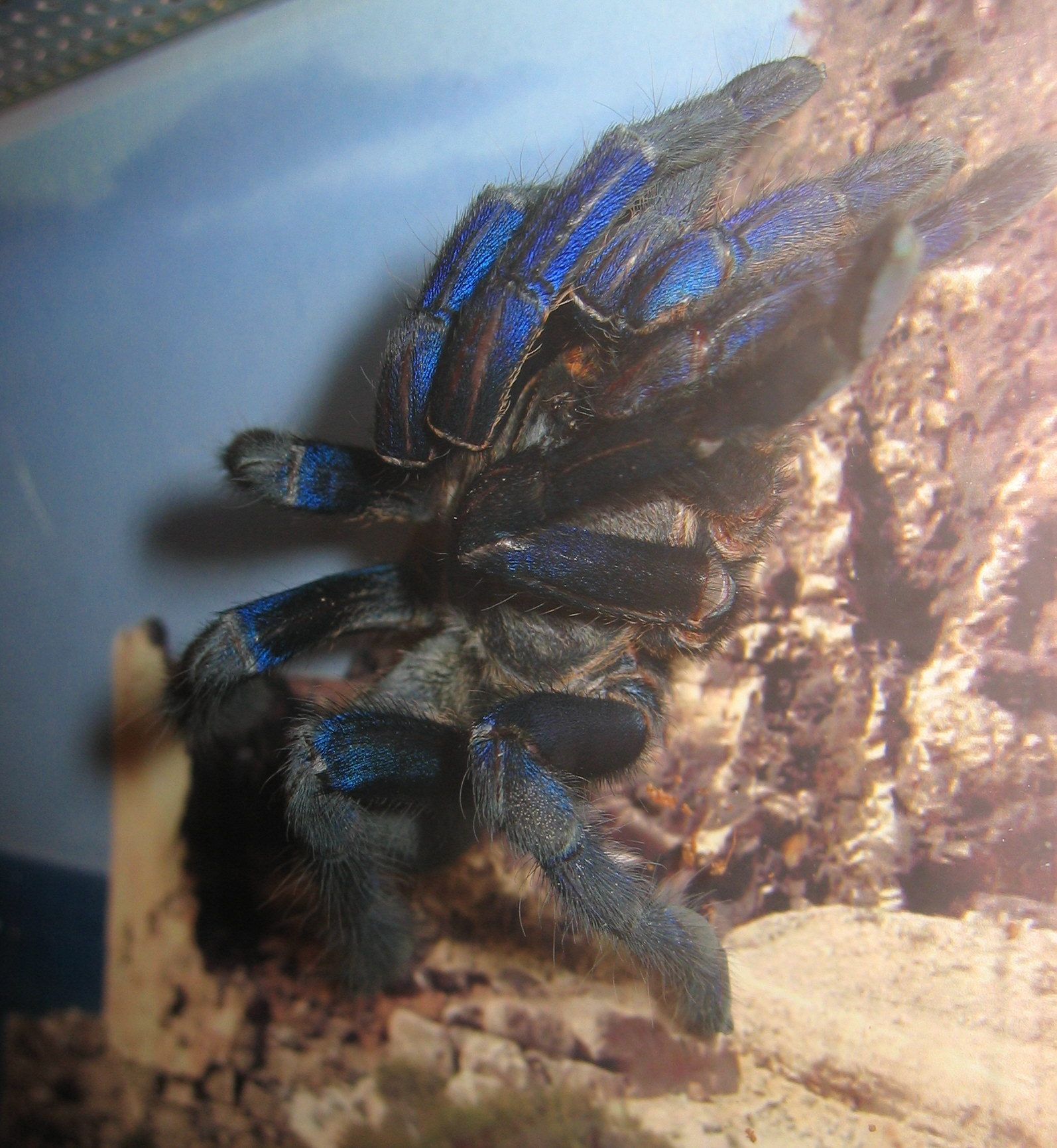
- Cobalt blue tarantula

Scientific classification
- Kingdom: Animalia
- Phylum: Arthropoda
- Subphylum: Chelicerata
- Class: Arachnida
- Order: Araneae
- Infraorder: Mygalomorphae
- Family: Theraphosidae
- Subfamily: Ornithoctoninae; Pocock, 1895

Genera
- Citharognathus; Cyriopagopus; Haplopelma; Lampropelma; Ornithoctonus; Phormingochilus

= Ornithoctoninae =

Subfamily of tarantulas

Ornithoctoninae is a subfamily of tarantulas found in Southeast Asia. It was first erected in 1895 by Reginald Innes Pocock based on the type specimen Ornithoctonus andersoni.

The Ornithoctoninae comprise a theraphosid subfamily, which is widely distributed in Asia from Myanmar to South China in the north and as far as to Halmahera in the Indonesian archipelago in the south, and in all the ranges in between. Most species in the subfamily live fossorially in burrows, though several species live arboreally. They are known as defensive spiders; when disturbed, they quickly retreat into their burrows or dig themselves into the soil. When neither is a possibility, they assume a defensive posture. When provoked, they strike the aggressor repeatedly with the anterior legs; if the aggressor does not retreat, these spiders have been known to bite. Though not deadly, the effects of the venom can be very unpleasant, including pain, swelling, and arthritis-like stiffness in the joints of the extremity affected.

The theraphosid subfamily Ornithoctoninae is defined by a combination of characteristics: Presence of retrolateral scopula of filiform setae on the cheliceral base, a small row of larger filiform paddle setae retrolaterally ventrobasally in connection to the retrolateral cheliceral scopula, and arrangement of stridulatory spines prolaterally on maxilla. The characteristic of retrolateral scopula of filiform setae on the cheliceral base is shared by the African subfamily Harpactirinae, but the Ornithoctoninae can be distinguished from the Harpactirinae by the geographic distribution range and the presence of the other characteristics mentioned, which are lacking in the Harpactirinae.

== As pets ==
Specimens from the genera Haplopelma, Cyriopagopus, and Ornithoctonus are frequently kept as pets. The most commonly kept species are: H. albostriatum, H. hainanum, H. lividum, H. longipes, H. minax, H. schmidti, O. aureotibialis, and C. schioedtei. More species are kept and new species enter the hobby every now and then, but most of this material needs to be properly identified or described.

== Genera and species of Ornithoctoninae ==
A list of known species in the Ornithoctoninae, sorted by genera:

Citharognathus (Pocock, 1895)
Type species: C. hosei

- Citharognathus hosei (Pocock, 1895) — Borneo
- Citharognathus tongmianensis (Zhu, Li & Song, 2002) — China

Cyriopagopus (Simon, 1887) [Senior synonym of Melognathus {Chamberlin, 1917}]
Type species: C. paganus

- Cyriopagopus dromeus (Chamberlin, ) — Philippines
- Cyriopagopus paganus (Simon, 1887) — Myanmar
- Cyriopagopus thorelli (Simon, 1901) — Malaysia

Haplopelma (Simon, 1892) [Senior synonym of Melopoeus {Pocock, 1895}]
Type species: Haplopelma doriae

Transferred to other genera:
Haplopelma chrysothrix (Schmidt & Samm, 2005) → Ornithoctonus aureotibialis
Haplopelma costale → Ornithoctonus costalis

In synonymy:
Haplopelma huwenum (Wang, Peng & Xie, 1993) = Haplopelma schmidti

- Haplopelma albostriatum (Simon, 1886) — Myanmar, Thailand, Cambodia, the Thai zebra
- Haplopelma doriae (Thorell, 1890) — Borneo
- Haplopelma hainanum (Liang et al., 1999) — China [Hainan Island], the Chinese {Hainan Island} black earth tiger
- Haplopelma lividum (Smith, 1996) — Myanmar, Thailand, the [Myanmarian] cobalt blue
- Haplopelma longipes (Von Wirth & Striffler, 2005) — Myanmar, the [Myanmarian] Vietnamese earth tiger
- Haplopelma minax (Thorell, 1897) — Myanmar, Thailand, the Thai black
- Haplopelma robustum (Strand, 1907) — Singapore, the Singaporean gold ring black and gray earth tiger
- Haplopelma salangense (Strand, 1907) — Malaysia
- Haplopelma schmidti (Von Wirth, 1991) — Vietnam, China, the [Vietnamese] Chinese gold earth tiger
- Haplopelma vonwirthi (Schmidt, 2005) — Vietnam

Lampropelma (Simon, 1892)
Type species: L. nigerrimum

- Lampropelma kirki (Simon, 1892) — Indonesia, the Sangihe Island black
- Lampropelma nigerrimum (Simon, 1892) — Indonesia, the Sangihe Island black

Omothymus (Simon, 1892)
Type species: Omothymus schioedtei

- Omothymus fuchsi (Strand, 1906) – Indonesia (Sumatra)
- Omothymus rafni Gabriel & Sherwood - Indonesia
- Omothymus schioedtei Thorell, 1891 – Malaysia
- Omothymus violaceopes (Abraham, 1924) — Malaysia, Singapore, the Singapore[an] blue

Ornithoctonus (Pocock, 1892)
Type species: O. andersoni

Transferred to other genera:
Ornithoctonus gadgili (Tikader, 1977) → Poecilotheria regalis
Ornithoctonus hainanus → Haplopelma hainanum
Ornithoctonus huwenus (Wang, Peng & Xie, 1993) → Haplopelma schmidti

- Ornithoctonus andersoni (Pocock, 1892) — Myanmar, the [Myanmarian] Asian mahogany mustard
- Ornithoctonus aureotibialis (Von Wirth & Striffler, 2005) — Thailand, the Thai gold fringed'
- Ornithoctonus costalis (Schmidt, 1998) — Thailand

Phormingochilus (Pocock, 1895)
Type species: P. everetti

Transferred to other genera:
Phormingochilus carpenteri Smith & Jacobi, 2015 → Lampropelma carpenteri
Phormingochilus fuchsi Strand, 1906 → Omothymus fuchsi
Phormingochilus kirki Smith & Jacobi, 2015 → Lampropelma kirki

- Phormingochilus arboricola (Schmidt & Barensteiner) – Borneo
- Phormingochilus everetti (Pocock, 1895) — Borneo
- Phormingochilus pennellhewlettorum Smith & Jacobi, 2015 — Borneo
- Phormingochilus tigrinus (Pocock, 1895) — Borneo
