= Phormingochilus hatihati =

Purple earth tiger

Scientific classification
- Kingdom: Animalia
- Phylum: Arthropoda
- Subphylum: Chelicerata
- Class: Arachnida
- Order: Araneae
- Infraorder: Mygalomorphae
- Family: Theraphosidae
- Genus: Phormingochilus
- Species: P. hatihati

Binomial name
- Phormingochilus hatihati Müller, Fardiansah, Schneider, Wanke, von Wirth & Wendt, 2024

Species of spider

Phormingochilus hatihati, formerly known under the names Cyriopagopus sp. 'hati hati' and Omothymus sp. 'hati hati', commonly known as the purple earth tiger, the Sulawesi violet tarantula, or erroneously as the Borneo purple, is a species of spider in the tarantula family Theraphosidae, found on the island of Sulawesi. It was first described by Simon Müller et al. in 2024.

== Etymology ==
The specific name "hatihati" is taken from an Indonesian translation for "caution".

== Description ==
This species demonstrates sexual dichromatism. Females present with dark grayish to bright purple legs with black femora, a clear fishbone pattern on the opisthosoma, and a pale tan carapace with radial stripes, while males are more of a tan overall, with less black legs and a less pronounced fishbone pattern on the opisthosoma.

== Habitat ==
Specimens have only been found in the lowland rainforests and mango plantations around Tammajarra, Polewali Mandar, West Sulawesi, Indonesia. This species is unusual in the Phormingochilus genus, as every other currently-described species is found on the island of Borneo, on the other side of the Wallace Line; however, it may not be the first instance of tarantulas migrating across this fauna boundary, as a 2025 phylogenetic study found this to be the likely origin of Australian tarantulas.

== Behavior ==
This is an arboreal tarantula, with adults often found in the knotholes, forks, and twists of aerial roots of trees. Spiderlings prefer to stay close to the ground, and are known to burrow. As they mature, they relocate to different trees. As with many arboreal tarantulas, this species is skittish, preferring to flee to the safety of a burrow or hide, but can bite if provoked.
