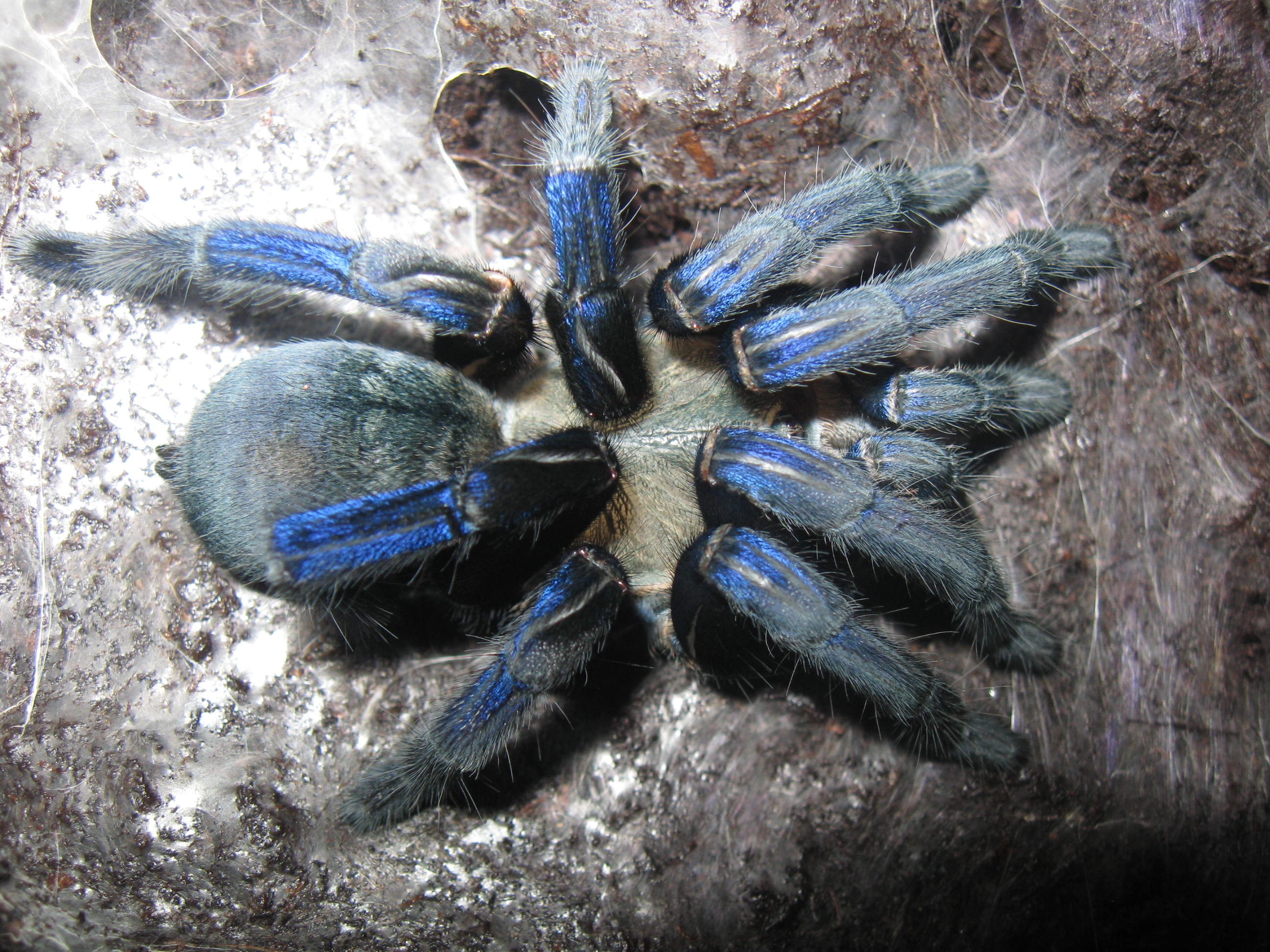
- Cyriopagopus lividus

Scientific classification
- Kingdom: Animalia
- Phylum: Arthropoda
- Subphylum: Chelicerata
- Class: Arachnida
- Order: Araneae
- Infraorder: Mygalomorphae
- Clade: Avicularioidea
- Family: Theraphosidae
- Genus: Cyriopagopus; Simon, 1887

Type species
- C. paganus Simon, 1887

Species
- 9, see text

Synonyms
- Haplopelma Simon, 1892; Melognathus Chamberlin, 1917; Melopoeus Pocock, 1895

= Cyriopagopus =

Genus of spiders

Cyriopagopus is a genus of southeast Asian tarantulas found from Myanmar to the Philippines. As of March 2017, the genus includes species formerly placed in Haplopelma. It was first described by Eugène Louis Simon in 1887.

== Description ==
The species formerly placed in Haplopelma are medium to large spiders; for example, Cyriopagopus schmidti females have a total body length, including chelicerae, up to 85 mm (3.3 in), with the longest leg, the first, being about 70 mm (2.8 in) long. The carapace (upper surface of the cephalothorax) is generally dark brown. They have eight eyes grouped on a distinctly raised portion of the cephalothorax, forming a "tubercle". The forward-facing (prolateral) sides of the maxillae have "thorns", which act as a stridulating organ. The first leg is usually the longest, followed by the fourth, second, and third. Mature females have an M-shaped spermatheca. Mature males have a spur on the forward-facing sides of the tibiae of the first pair of legs and a pear-shaped palpal bulb with a wide, curved embolus.

== Taxonomy ==
The nomenclature of a group of theraphosid genera from South and Southeast Asia, including Cyriopagopus, Haplopelma, Lampropelma, Omothymus, and Phormingochilus, is somewhat confused. The status of the genera has changed several times recently, and species have been moved from one genus to another. Currently, Haplopelma is considered to be a junior synonym of Cyriopagopus, and Melopoeus of Haplopelma, hence of Cyriopagopus, but this may change.

The genus Cyriopagopus was erected by Eugène Simon in 1887 for the species Cyriopagopus paganus from Burma. In 1985, Robert Raven made Cyriopagopus the senior synonym of Melognathus Chamberlin, 1917. In 1890, Tamerlan Thorell described a species of spider under the name Selenocosmia doriae. In 1892, Eugène Simon decided that this species was sufficiently different from others placed in the genus Selenocosmia to warrant a new genus, Haplopelma, with one species, Haplopelma doriae. Raven in 1985 also decided that Haplopelma was the senior synonym of Melopoeus Pocock, 1895. A. M. Smith studied the type specimen of Cyriopagopus paganus (the type species of Cyriopagopus) and decided that it had the key characteristics of Haplopelma, making Cyriopagopus the senior synonym of Haplopelma. This analysis is accepted by the World Spider Catalog as of March 2017, with the comment that "Haplopelma, Cyriopagopus, Melopoeus, and other ornithoctonine genera are in urgent need of revision".

== Distribution and habitat ==
The genus is found in Southeast Asia (China, Myanmar, Thailand, Cambodia, Vietnam, Malaysia, and Singapore), Borneo, and the Philippines. Species that have been studied live in underground, silk-lined tubes, often with a surrounding web of radiating signal threads. They may be found in small colonies at the base of trees or bamboos. Some species favour steep, south-facing slopes.

== Toxicity ==
Like all Old World tarantulas, spiders in the genus Cyriopagopus lack the urticating hairs found in their New World counterparts, hence use biting as a primary means of both attack and defence. Some Cyriopagopus species are among those reported to have more toxic venom. Although bites may cause severe pain and a range of other effects, no fatalities are known. Cyriopagopus lividus, C. hainanus, and C. schmidti (under its synonym Selenocosmia huwena) have had their venom characterized. The last two produce hainantoxins and huwentoxins, respectively. The large fangs can produce puncture wounds which are susceptible to bacterial infection if not treated properly.

== Species ==
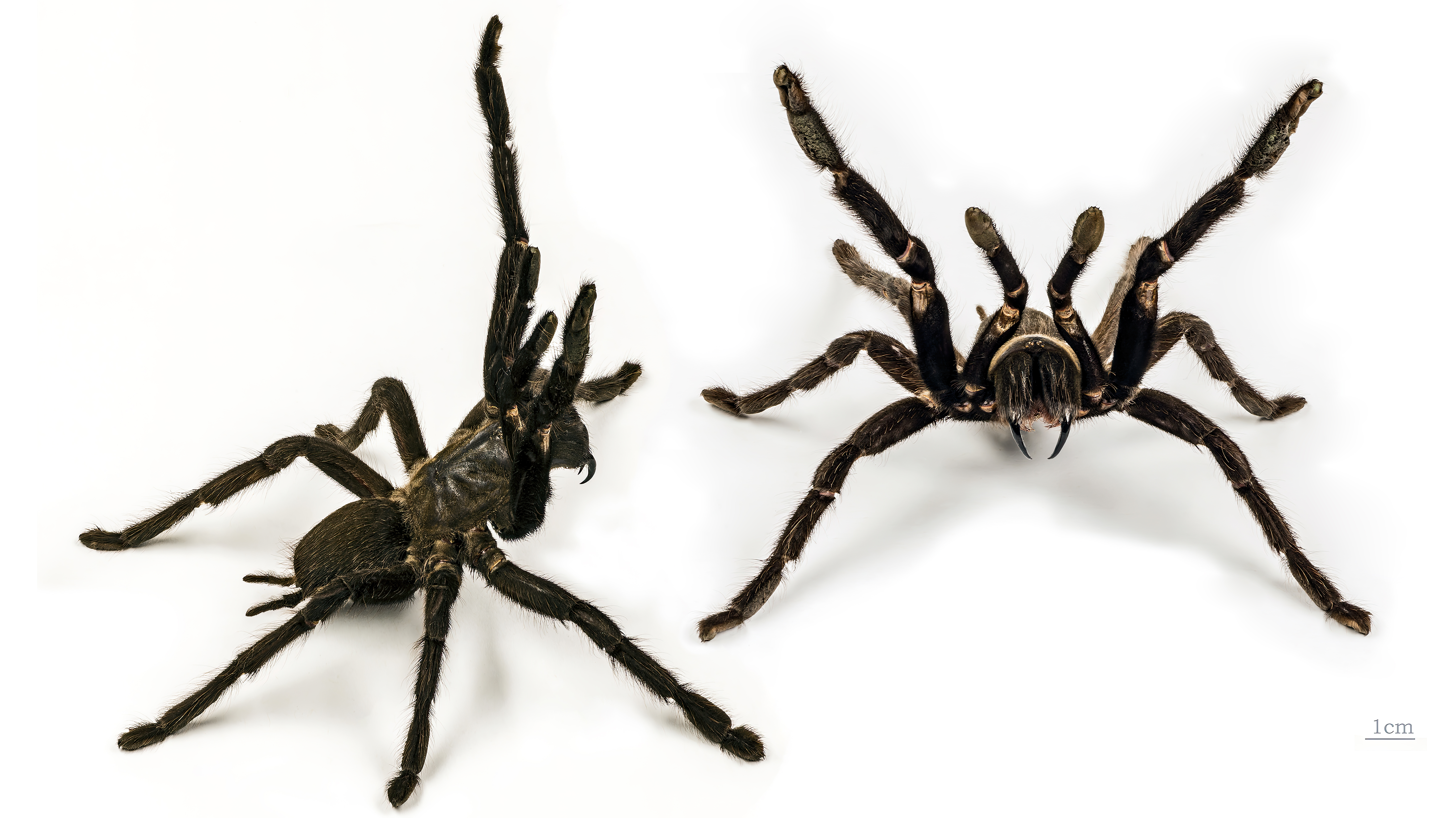
Cyriopagopus minax in Thailand

As of July 2022 it contains nine species, found in Asia:

- Cyriopagopus albostriatus (Simon, 1886) – Myanmar, Thailand, Cambodia
- Cyriopagopus doriae (Thorell, 1890) – Malaysia (Borneo)
- Cyriopagopus hainanus (Liang, Peng, Huang & Chen, 1999) – China
- Cyriopagopus lividus (Smith, 1996) – Myanmar, Thailand
- Cyriopagopus longipes (von Wirth & Striffler, 2005) – Thailand, Laos, Cambodia (Vietnam Tiger)
- Cyriopagopus minax (Thorell, 1897) – Myanmar, Thailand (Thailand Black)
- Cyriopagopus paganus Simon, 1887 (type) – Myanmar
- Cyriopagopus schmidti (von Wirth, 1991) – China, Vietnam
- Cyriopagopus vonwirthi (Schmidt, 2005) – Southeast Asia

=== In synonymy ===
- C. huwenus (Wang, Peng & Xie, 1993) = Cyriopagopus schmidti (von Wirth, 1991)

==== Transferred to other genera ====
- Cyriopagopus dromeus (Chamberlin, 1917) → Melognathus dromeus
- Cyriopagopus schioedtei (Thorell, 1891) → Omothymus schioedtei
- Cyriopagopus thorelli (Simon, 1901) → Omothymus schioedtei

==== Nomen Dubia ====
- Cyriopagopus robustus (Strand, 1907) - Singapore
- Cyriopagopus salangensis (Strand, 1907) - Malaysia
