= Cl6a =

Toxin

μ-THTX-Cl6a, also known as Cl6a, is a 33-residue peptide toxin extracted from the venom of the spider Cyriopagopus longipes. The toxin acts as an inhibitor of the tetrodotoxin-sensitive (TTX-S) voltage-gated sodium channel (Na_{V}1.7), thereby causing sustained reduction of Na_{V}1.7 currents.

Cl6a
Organism	Cyriopagopus longipepes
Super family	Spider peptide toxins
Family	NaSpTx family 1
Amino acid sequence	ACKGVFDPCTPGKNECCPNRVCSDKHKWCKWKI
Molecular weight	3775.6 Da

== Etymology and Source ==
Cl6a is a peptide extracted from the venom of the Cyriopagopus longipes, which was first described by von Wirth and Striffler in 2005. This spider lives in multiple Southeast Asian countries such as Thailand, Cambodia and Laos. Cyriopagopus longipes originates from the Cyriopagopus, which is a genus of the southeast Asian tarantula.

== Chemistry ==
=== Structure ===
Cl6a is a 33 amino acid residue peptide toxin with a molecular weight of 3775.6 Dalton. Its molecular structure encompasses six cysteine residues, which demonstrate three disulfide bonds that assemble an inhibitor cystine knot (ICK) scaffold. Generally, ICK peptides are most prominently present in the venom of snails and spiders. These peptides usually function as gating modifier toxins affecting the gating and kinetic properties of voltage-gated ion channels. The ICK fold is characterized by two β-strands composing the polypeptide backbone from which two disulfide bonds originate. These disulfide bonds and the polypeptide backbone form a ring structure, which is innervated by a third sulfide bond creating a pseudoknot. This comprises an extraordinarily stable protein structure, which is resistant to heat denaturation, extreme pH environments and proteolysis.

=== Family and homology ===
Cl6a belongs to the voltage-gated sodium channel (Na_{V})-targeting spider toxin (NaSpTx) family 1, because it accommodates the same cysteine structure and ICK scaffold. Toxins of NaSpTx family 1 are characterized by containing the following motif present in the amino acid sequence of the toxins: (R/K)X(R/K)WCK. The amino acid sequence of Cl6a contains the NaSpTx family 1 motif KHKWCK. Cl6a highly resembles a similar sequence with other spider peptide toxins. For instance, the amino acid sequence of Cl6a shows 67% sequence similarity with Hainantoxin (HNTX) III and 97% with huwentoxin (HWTX) I.

== Target ==
Cl6a is a selective antagonist of voltage-gated sodium channels. It targets TTX-S channels (Na_{V}1.2, Na_{V}1.3, Na_{V}1.4, Na_{V}1.6 and Na_{V}1.7) with the highest affinity against Na_{V}1.7 channels. Na_{V}1.7 channels are expressed in nociceptive dorsal root ganglion (DRG), sympathetic and olfactory sensory neurons. Na_{V}1.7 channels are located in epidermal free nerve endings and more centrally in the superficial lamina of the spinal cord.

== Mode of action ==
Cl6a induces an irreversible inhibition of Na_{V}1.7 peak currents with a slow onset of action. Cl6a alters the current-voltage relationship of Na_{V}1.7 channels by binding to site 4 of domain II (DII S3-S4), which contains acidic residues. Cl6a acquires a positively charged surface that interacts with the acidic residues of site 4. Subsequently, the DII S3-S4 voltage sensor becomes trapped. Hereby, the channel is less sensitive to changes in the membrane voltage. As a consequence, the inward sodium current is not initiated. Consequently, there will be a decrease in neuronal excitability.

== Toxicity ==
Cl6a selectively blocks Na_{V}1.7 channels, which are involved in peripheral pain relief. The half-maximal inhibitory concentration (IC_{50}) of Cl6a is 11.00 ± 2.5 nM. Generally, spider peptide toxins can incapacitate prey and hereby promote successful predation. In combination with the irreversible properties of Cl6a, this spider peptide toxin could indirectly be lethal to its prey.

== Therapeutic use ==
Cl6a exhibits a high affinity against Na_{V}1.7 channels, which are known to be critically involved in peripheral pain regulation. Other spider peptide toxins like HNTX-III and GpTx1 cause reversible inhibition of Na_{V}1.7 channels. However, Cl6a induces irreversible inhibition of Na_{V}1.7 channel activity. Therefore, this spider peptide toxin is a potential therapeutic target by obtaining prolonged blockage of Na_{V}1.7 channels. Nonetheless, Cl6a also inhibits Na_{V}1.4 and Na_{V}1.5 currents, which are involved in skeletal and cardiac muscle functioning.

Since Cl6a contains the ICK motif, which is interestingly resistant to proteases, this peptide toxin could have further therapeutic implications. ICK peptides are stable in the human body for multiple days and demonstrate half-lives larger than 12 hours in a simulated gastric environment. Altogether, this implies that the ICK motif of Cl6a could contribute to the delivery of certain therapeutic agents to a specific location in the human body.
