= Cl6b =

Spider-derived neurotoxin

Cl6b (μ-THTX-Cl6b) is a peptide toxin from the venom of the spider Cyriopagopus longipes. It acts as a sodium channel blocker: Cl6b significantly and persistently reduces currents through the tetrodotoxin-sensitive sodium channels Na_{V}1.2-1.4, Na_{V}1.6, and Na_{V}1.7.

== Structure ==
The Cl6b peptide has a molecular weight of 3708.9 Da. It contains 33 amino acid residues, among which six cysteines that engage in three disulfide bonds to form a structural motif known as an inhibitor cystine knot (ICK). This structure grants stability to the toxin and has been identified previously in other spider peptide toxins that share high sequence similarity to Cl6b.

=== Family ===
Simultaneously with the isolation of Cl6b, another peptide toxin known as Cl6a was characterized from the same spider species. The two Cl6 peptides share a sequence identity of 78.8%, including the six cysteines that make both peptides adopt the ICK motif.

== Target ==
Cl6b acts as a selective sodium channel blocker.

== Source in nature ==
Cl6b has been isolated from Cyriopagopus longipes, an Asian spider mainly found in Thailand, Cambodia, Laos, and China.

== Activity mechanism ==
Cl6b significantly reduces currents through the tetrodotoxin-sensitive sodium channels Na_{V}1.2, Na_{V}1.3, Na_{V}1.4, Na_{V}1.6, and Na_{V}1.7, with no effect on the tetrodotoxin-resistant sodium channels Na_{V}1.5, Na_{V}1.8, Na_{V}1.9. Cl6b exhibits a particularly high affinity to Na_{V}1.7 channels, which are present in great numbers in nociceptors (pain neurons) located at the dorsal root ganglion. The activity of Cl6b on Na_{V}1.7 has similar characteristics compared to previously reported Na_{V}1.7-peptide inhibitors, such as HWTX-IV., as Cl6b binds to the domain II segments three and four, which are part of the domain's voltage sensor. The binding is high-affinity (half-maximal inhibitory concentration (IC_{50}) 18.80 ± 2.4 nM). It is also irreversible, which poises it as a candidate for the development of long-term in-vivo analgesia.
