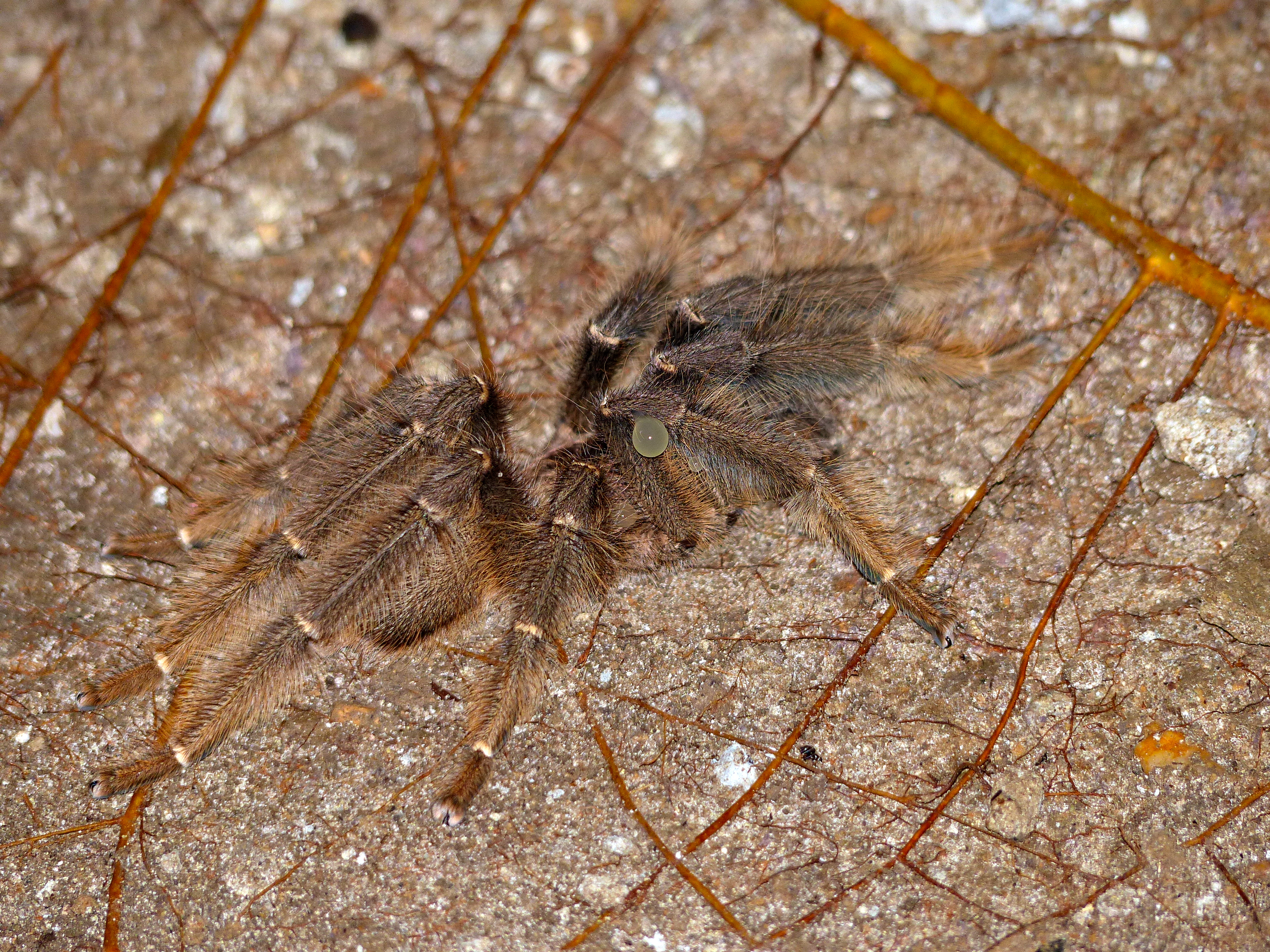
- Lampropelma carpenteri

Scientific classification
- Kingdom: Animalia
- Phylum: Arthropoda
- Subphylum: Chelicerata
- Class: Arachnida
- Order: Araneae
- Infraorder: Mygalomorphae
- Family: Theraphosidae
- Genus: Lampropelma; Simon, 1892

Type species
- L. nigerrimum Simon, 1892

Species
- 2, see text

= Lampropelma =

Genus of spiders

Lampropelma is a genus of Indonesian tarantulas that was first described by Eugène Louis Simon in 1892. As of March 2020 it contains two species, found in Indonesia.

== Diagnosis ==
They can be distinguished from Phormingochilus and Omothymus though to the apical swelling of the embolus, which then narrows to a point in the apex. Furthermore their distribution can be used as an identifying factor, as they are only found in Indonesia.

== Species ==
As of July 2022, this genus owns two species, both being found in Indonesia.

- Lampropelma carpenteri (Smith & Jacobi, 2015) - Borneo, Indonesia
- Lampropelma nigerrimum Simon, 1892 - Indonesia

=== In synonymy ===
- Lampropelma kirki (Smith & Jacobi, 2015) = Lampropelma carpenteri

=== Transferred to other genera ===
- Lampropelma nigerrimum arboricola Schmidt & Barensteiner, 2015 → Phormingochilus arboricola
- Lampropelma violaceopes Abraham, 1924 → Omothymus violaceopes
