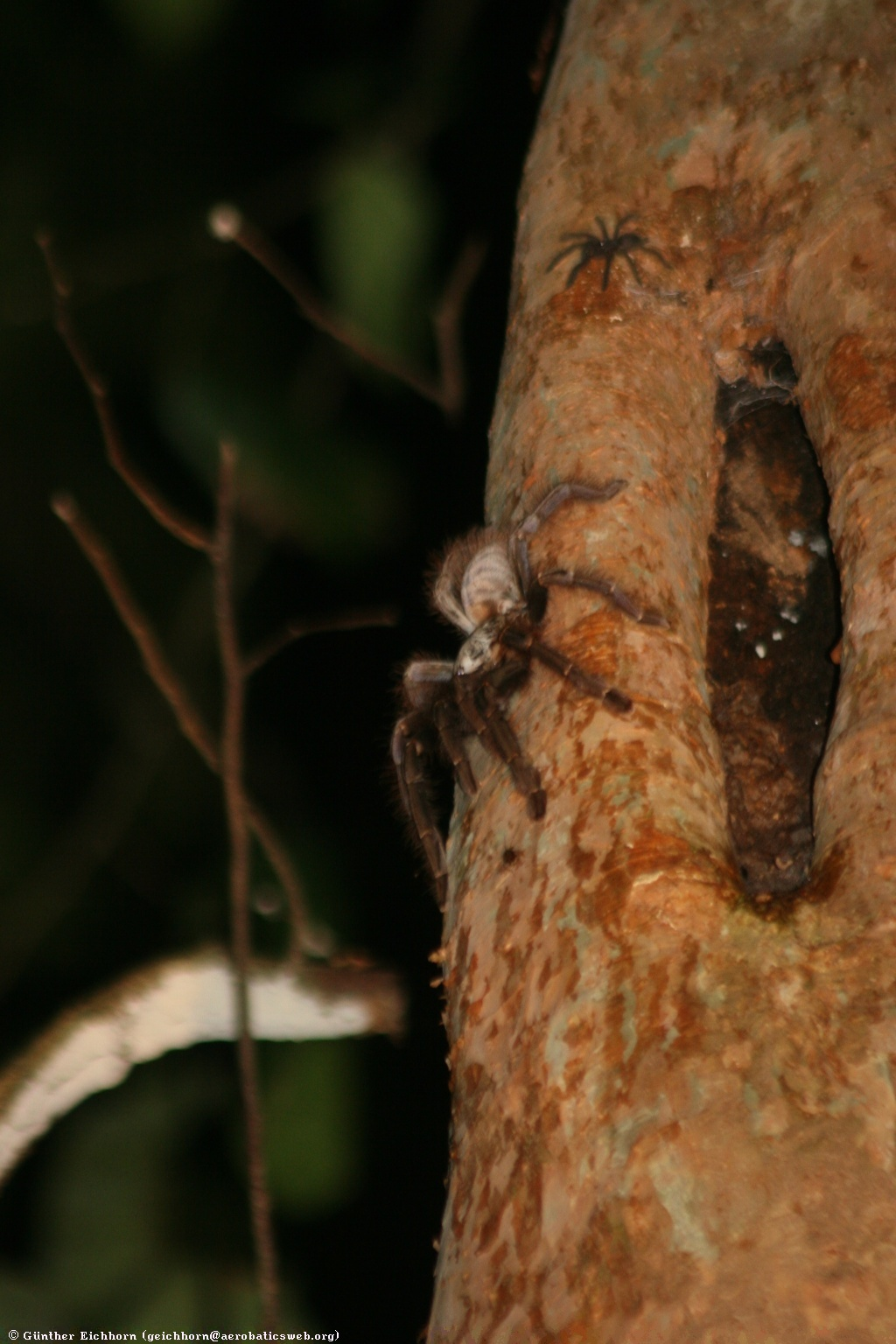
- In Borneo, Malaysia

Scientific classification
- Kingdom: Animalia
- Phylum: Arthropoda
- Subphylum: Chelicerata
- Class: Arachnida
- Order: Araneae
- Infraorder: Mygalomorphae
- Family: Theraphosidae
- Genus: Omothymus
- Species: O. schioedtei

Binomial name
- Omothymus schioedtei Thorell, 1891

Synonyms
- Cyriopagopus schioedtei (Thorell, 1891)

= Malaysian earthtiger tarantula =

Species of spider

The Malaysian earthtiger tarantula, scientific name Omothymus schioedtei, is a species of spider in the family Theraphosidae (tarantulas), found in Peninsular Malaysia and southern Thailand. It is also known by the synonym Cyriopagopus schioedtei.

== Description ==
Omothymus schioedtei is a large and colourful arboreal tarantula from the subfamily Ornithoctoninae. It is a very large spider with a leg span of 22 cm (8.7 in) and a carapace length above 3 cm (1.2 in). The species exhibits distinct sexual dimorphism. Males are olive green in colouration which becomes more prominent with each subsequent molt until maturity. Females are brown as juveniles, and with each molt gain a lighter olive green carapace and a dark grey and black abdomen and legs. Both sexes have long red hairs covering their abdomen and legs in addition to stripes on their abdomens which resemble the stripes of tigers, giving the species their common name.

== Taxonomy ==
Omothymus schioedtei was first described by Tamerlan Thorell in 1891, the type species of his new genus Omothymus. In 1903, Eugène Simon synonymized Omothymus with Cyriopagopus, hence Omothymus schioedtei became Cyriopagopus schioedtei.

The relationship between a number of genera of East Asian spiders was unclear as of March 2017. A. M. Smith and M. A. Jacobi in 2015 restored the species to its original name of Omothymus schioedtei, on the grounds that the type species of the genus Cyriopagopus, C. paganus, was not distinct from the genus Haplopelma, unlike C. schioedtei. They also synonymized Haplopelma with Cyriopagopus.

== Distribution and habitat ==
The species is found in Malaysia and Thailand. It lives in primary lowland and foothill monsoon forest in hollow trees many meters up. Adult females are almost entirely found in large mature trees, but younger animals can be found behind loose bark, in rock crevices and in man made structures like bridges and board walks.
