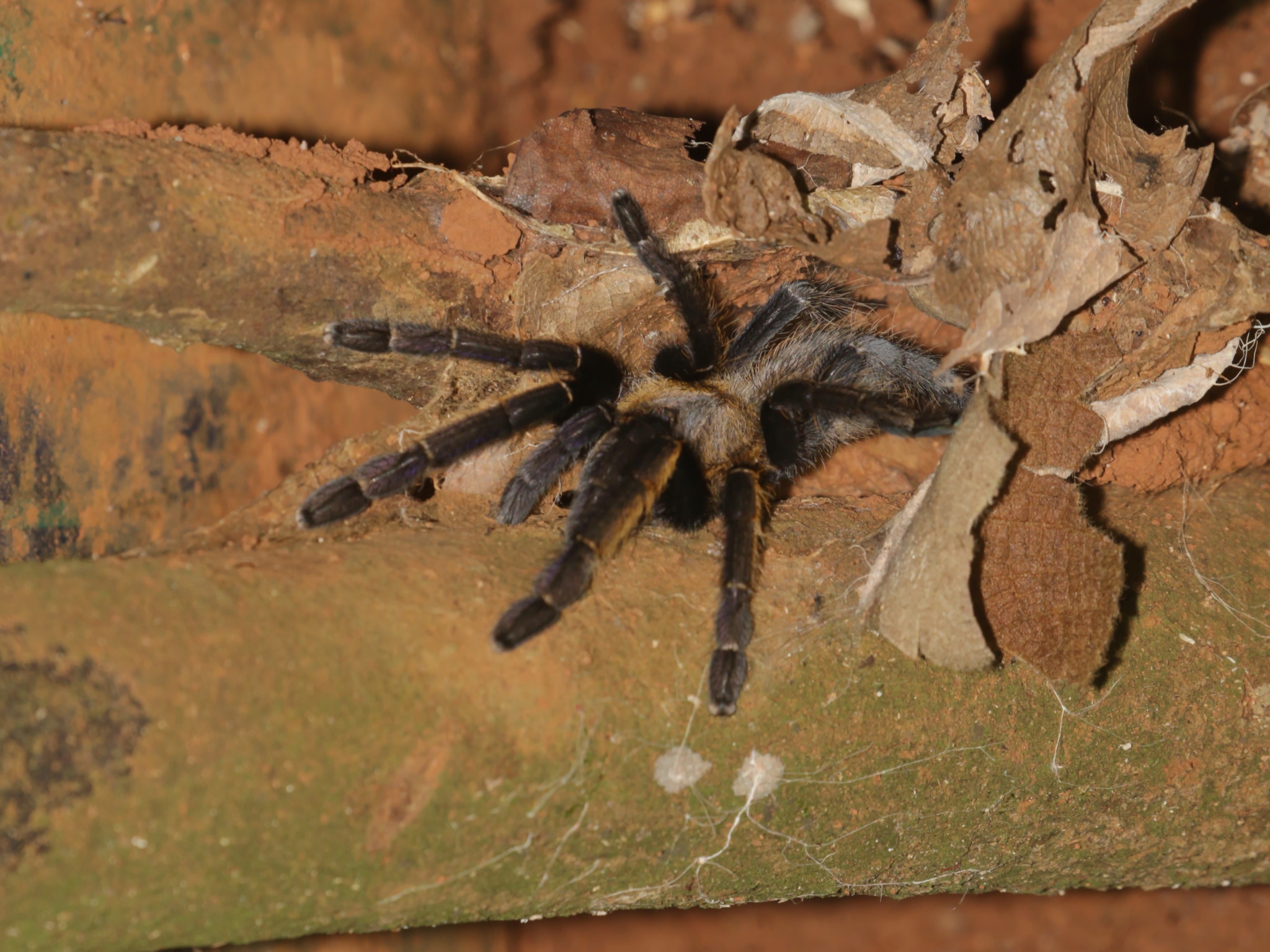

Scientific classification
- Kingdom: Animalia
- Phylum: Arthropoda
- Subphylum: Chelicerata
- Class: Arachnida
- Order: Araneae
- Infraorder: Mygalomorphae
- Family: Theraphosidae
- Genus: Ornithoctonus
- Species: O. aureotibialis

Binomial name
- Ornithoctonus aureotibialis von Wirth & Striffler, 2005

= Ornithoctonus aureotibialis =

Species of tarantula

Ornithoctonus aureotibialis (also known as Thailand Brown Tarantula or Thailand Golden Fringe) is a tarantula species in the Ornithoctonus genus, it was first described by Volker von Wirth and Boris F. Striffler in 2005. It is named for the Latin, aureus being "golden" and tibia. Because of the gold or orange coloured line of hair in the tibiae of the legs in subadult and adult females and subadult males. Its common name is Thailand Golden Fringe, as the name may suggest it is found in Thailand, Myanmar and Malaysia. It is sometimes kept as a pet, and are captive bred.

== Characteristics ==
Females live 14 to 15 years and males 3 to 4 under proper care, they grow to around 14–15 cm, and have a medium growth rate. Females, legs are black, thought they are all around dark. Males are a lighter on the top and have black legs. On the patellae and tibia of the front legs there is a clearly visible golden, sometimes orange hair fringe in subadults and adults females and subadults males. On the opisthosoma there is a light fishbone pattern, some also describe it as a tiger pattern, of darker lines on the upper side.

== Habitat ==
They can be found in Thailand, Myanmar and Malaysia, including the area of Banglang National Park, which will be referred to when describing their habitat. The area this tarantula inhabits is tropical rainforest, they can be found roughly 600m above sea level, with temperatures of 32 °C, and the average yearly rainfall being 2860mm.

== Behavior ==
These are fossorial old world tarantulas, they are known for being defensive. These tarantula will first try to run, when it sees you, and then under constant provocation will try to bite. While this tarantula is fossorial, they make vertical tubular burrows and will usually stay deep in their burrow, their burrows reaches 30–40 cm deep. It is thought this spider has a painful bite, with strong venom, though no study has been done.
