= Melognathus =

Scientific classification
- Kingdom: Animalia
- Phylum: Arthropoda
- Subphylum: Chelicerata
- Class: Arachnida
- Order: Araneae
- Infraorder: Mygalomorphae
- Family: Theraphosidae
- Genus: Melognathus; Chamberlin, 1917
- Species: M. dromeus

Binomial name
- Melognathus dromeus Chamberlin, 1917

Genus of tarantulas

Melognathus is a monotypic genus of southeast Asian tarantulas containing the single species, Melognathus dromeus. It was erected in 1917 for a holotype collected from a ship that visited southeast Asia. In 1985, the species was moved to Cyriopagopus because the autapomorphies were not considered significant enough to warrant a new genus. Opinions between biologists were split, some using the original name and some using Cyriopagopus. In a 2019 report, Gabriel and Sherwood pointed out that in addition to the differences in pedipalp morphology, the holotype exhibits leg features that indicate an arboreal species, while species of Cyriopagopus are largely terrestrial. The ambiguous location of the holotype has left room for speculation, but as of February 2022 the World Spider Catalog accepts this genus.

== See also ==
- Cyriopagopus
- Omothymus
