= Citharognathus =

Scientific classification
- Kingdom: Animalia
- Phylum: Arthropoda
- Subphylum: Chelicerata
- Class: Arachnida
- Order: Araneae
- Infraorder: Mygalomorphae
- Family: Theraphosidae
- Subfamily: Ornithoctoninae
- Genus: Citharognathus; Pocock, 1895

Type species
- C. hosei Pocock, 1895

Species
- C. hosei Pocock, 1895 – Borneo

Genus of spiders

Citharognathus is a monotypic genus of Asian tarantulas that was first described by Reginald Innes Pocock in 1895. As of October 2025 it contains one species: C. hosei.

== Diagnosis ==
They can be distinguished by their clypeus, which is less than the with of the eye group. The leg 4 is also distinctly thicker and longer than leg 1.
