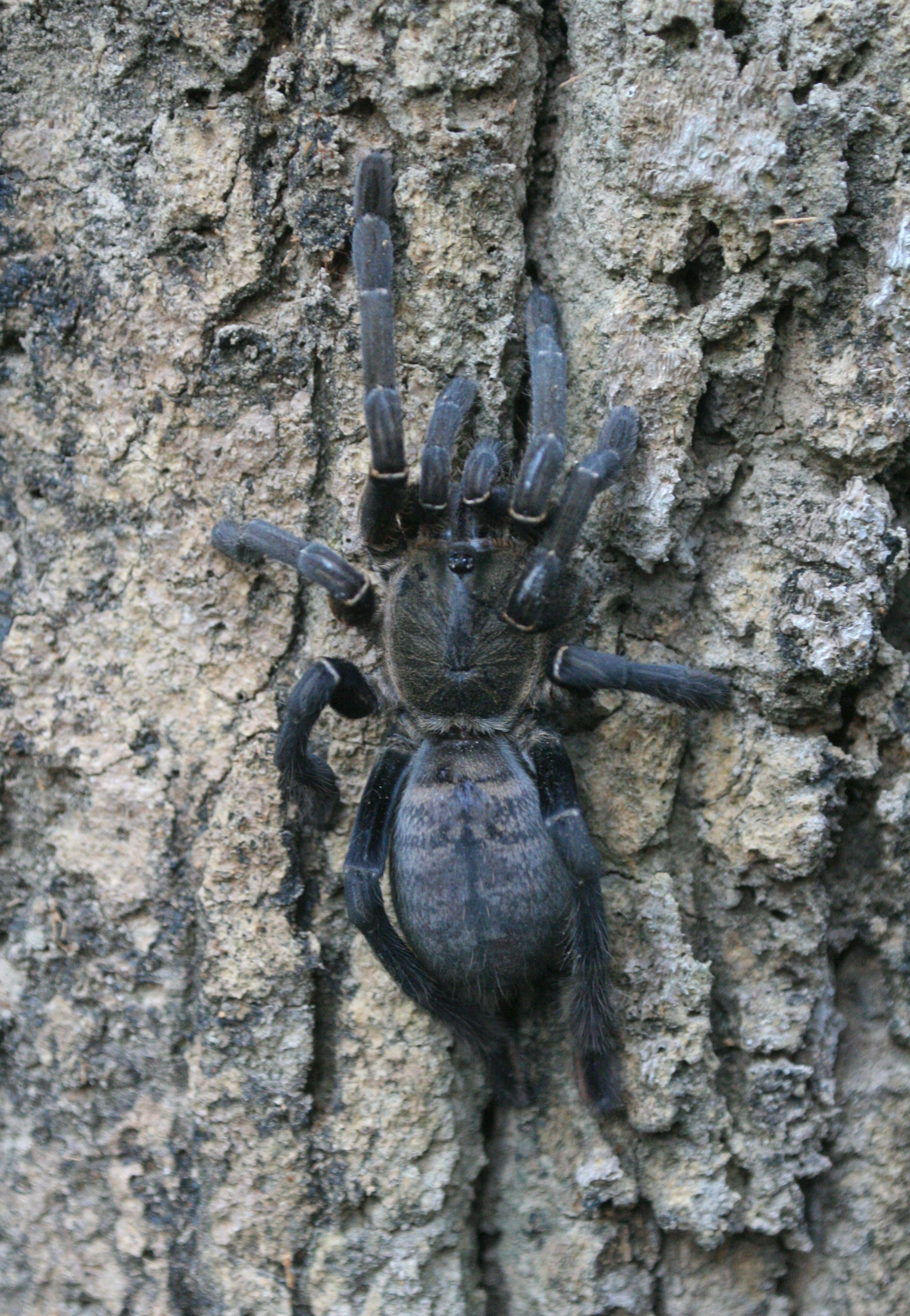
- C. longipes photographed in Cambodia

Scientific classification
- Kingdom: Animalia
- Phylum: Arthropoda
- Subphylum: Chelicerata
- Class: Arachnida
- Order: Araneae
- Infraorder: Mygalomorphae
- Family: Theraphosidae
- Genus: Cyriopagopus
- Species: C. longipes

Binomial name
- Cyriopagopus longipes von Wirth & Striffler, 2005

Synonyms
- Haplopelma longipes

= Cyriopagopus longipes =

Species of spider

Cyriopagopus longipes (also formerly known as Haplopelma longipes) is a species of tarantula found in Southeast Asia.

Cl6a and Cl6b, two Na_{v}1.7-inhibiting toxins, were originally isolated from the venom of C. longipes.
