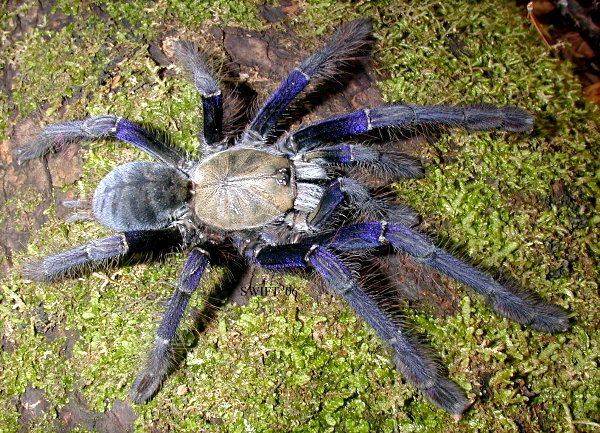

Scientific classification
- Kingdom: Animalia
- Phylum: Arthropoda
- Subphylum: Chelicerata
- Class: Arachnida
- Order: Araneae
- Infraorder: Mygalomorphae
- Family: Theraphosidae
- Genus: Omothymus
- Species: O. violaceopes

Binomial name
- Omothymus violaceopes Abraham, 1924

= Singapore blue =

Singapore Blue

Species of spider

The Singapore Blue (also known as the Malaysia Blue) (Omothymus violaceopes) is a large, arboreal species of tarantula from Malaysia and Singapore. These spiders have been known to grow in excess of 9 inches (23 cm) across. The legs are an intense blue with a brown or gold carapace. The male is usually not as vibrant; the species exhibits sexual dimorphism. The generic placement of the species has been questioned, and specimens identified as males of this species may actually be from a different species.

== Taxonomy ==
Omothymus violaceopes was first described by H. C. Abraham in 1924, under the name Lampropelma violaceopedes. However, specific names under the International Code of Zoological Nomenclature cannot be plural, so violaceopedes was corrected to violaceopes.

In August 2019, the species was transferred to the genus Omothymus.

== Food ==
Diet consists primarily of large beetles, cockroaches, large crickets, mantids, and other large arthropods. Occasionally, young mice, birds and other small vertebrates are taken. During feeding, the abdomen (opisthosoma) will often increase its size two-fold.

== In captivity ==
Singapore blues are commonly kept as pets because of their beautiful colours. Caution should be taken, as Singapore blues are a relatively aggressive species and tend to bite as the first line of defense.

Recommended feeding includes four to six live crickets every few weeks. Gut loading, or providing prey with vitamins and other nutrients, provides tarantulas with a healthy meal. Uneaten prey should be removed after one day. Fasting, or not eating, for days or weeks at a time is sometimes an indication of an upcoming moult. A water dish should be supplied and the water changed regularly to prevent harmful bacterial growth.
