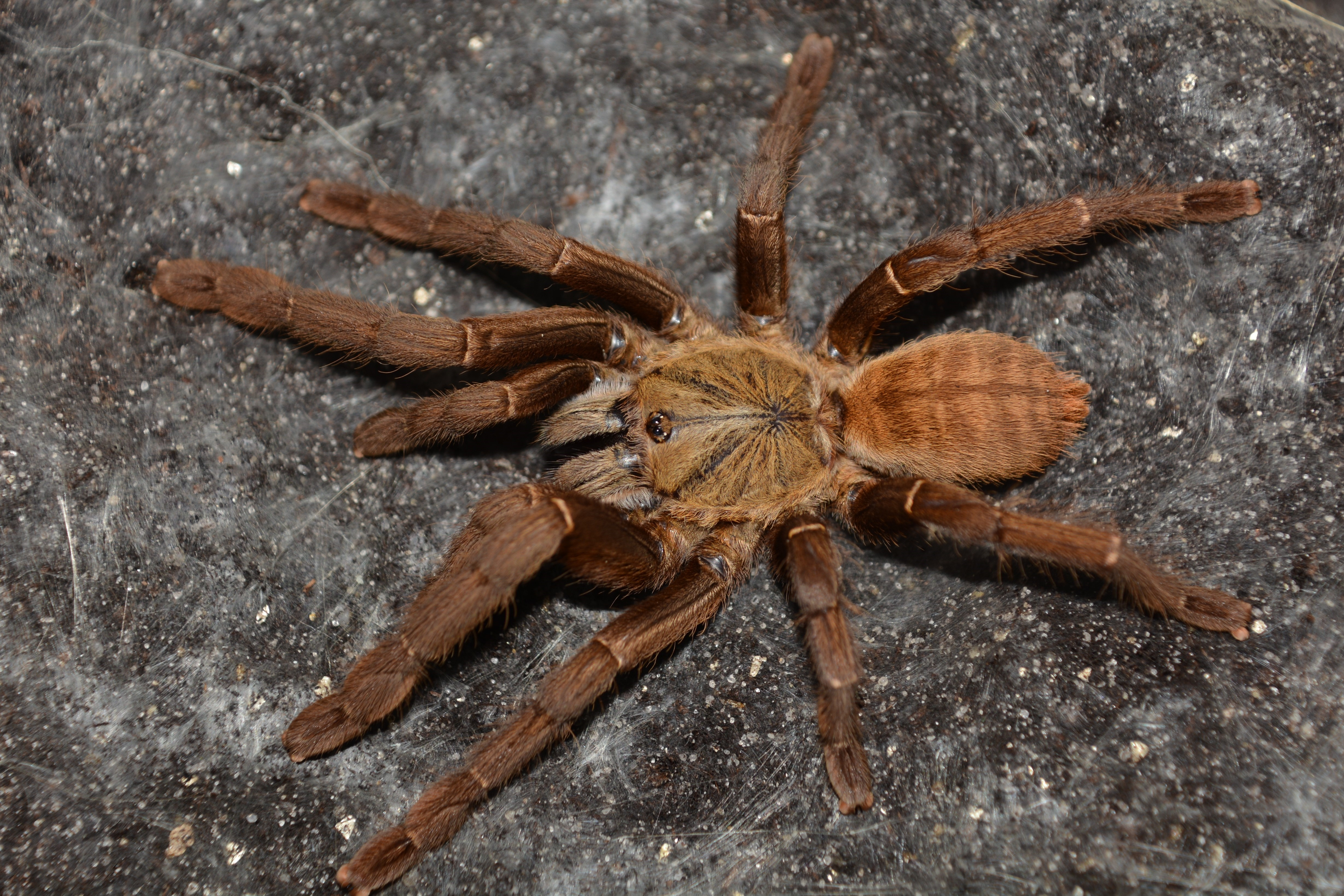
- In captivity

Scientific classification
- Kingdom: Animalia
- Phylum: Arthropoda
- Subphylum: Chelicerata
- Class: Arachnida
- Order: Araneae
- Infraorder: Mygalomorphae
- Family: Theraphosidae
- Genus: Cyriopagopus
- Species: C. hainanus

Binomial name
- Cyriopagopus hainanus (Liang et al., 1999)

Synonyms
- Selenocosmia hainana Liang et al., 1999; Ornithoctonus hainana (Liang et al., 1999); Haplopelma hainanum (Liang et al., 1999)

= Cyriopagopus hainanus =

Species of spider

Cyriopagopus hainanus is a species of spider in the family Theraphosidae (tarantulas), found in China. It is one of a number of species from China and Vietnam known as "Chinese bird spider". It produces a venom containing numerous compounds capable of blocking neurotransmitters, including neurotoxic peptides called hainantoxins.

== Description ==
Cyriopagopus hainanus resembles C. schmidti, but can be distinguished by its dark black-brown body and the longer "thorns" on the forward-facing (prolateral) side of the maxillae. The carapace (upper surface of the cephalothorax is black-brown, the sternum (under surface of the cephalothorax) is red-brown; and the abdomen is dark brown, with six black stripes running across it and a black stripe down the centre of the upper surface.

The female is about 60 mm long (body plus chelicerae). The first leg is longest, at about 67 mm, the third being the shortest, at about 51 mm. The spermatheca is M-shaped. The male is smaller, about 34 mm long (body plus chelicerae). The fourth leg is the longest, at about 61 mm, the third being the shortest, at about 47 mm. Thus, although the body is significantly smaller than that of the female, the male's legs are of a similar length. The tibiae of the first legs have a spur on the forward-facing side. The palpal bulb is pear-shaped, with a wide, curved embolus.

C. hainanus makes burrows, lined with silk, and often with silk alarm lines radiating from the mouth. The spider remains in its burrow during the day, emerging only at night to catch prey, mainly large insects.

== Taxonomy ==
Cyriopagopus hainanus was first described as Selenocosmia hainana by S. P. Liang et al. in 1999. It has since been moved; in 2001, M. S. Zhu et al. transferred it to the genus Ornithoctonus. In 2003, Gunter Schmidt placed the species in the genus Haplopelma. In 2015, it was transferred to the genus Cyriopagopus.

== Distribution and habitat ==
Cyriopagopus hainanus is only known from Hainan, an island off the mainland of southern China. It is found on south-facing mountain slopes, steeply sloping at 75 to 85°.

== Toxicity ==
Its venom is the subject of toxicology research, and while the effects of this spider's bite on humans are not well documented, it is frequently lethal in small doses to laboratory animals such as mice and rats. As a result, Cyriopagopus hainanus is generally regarded as a highly venomous species. The venom is a complex neurotoxin, containing numerous compounds capable of blocking neurotransmitters, including neurotoxic peptides called hainantoxins.
