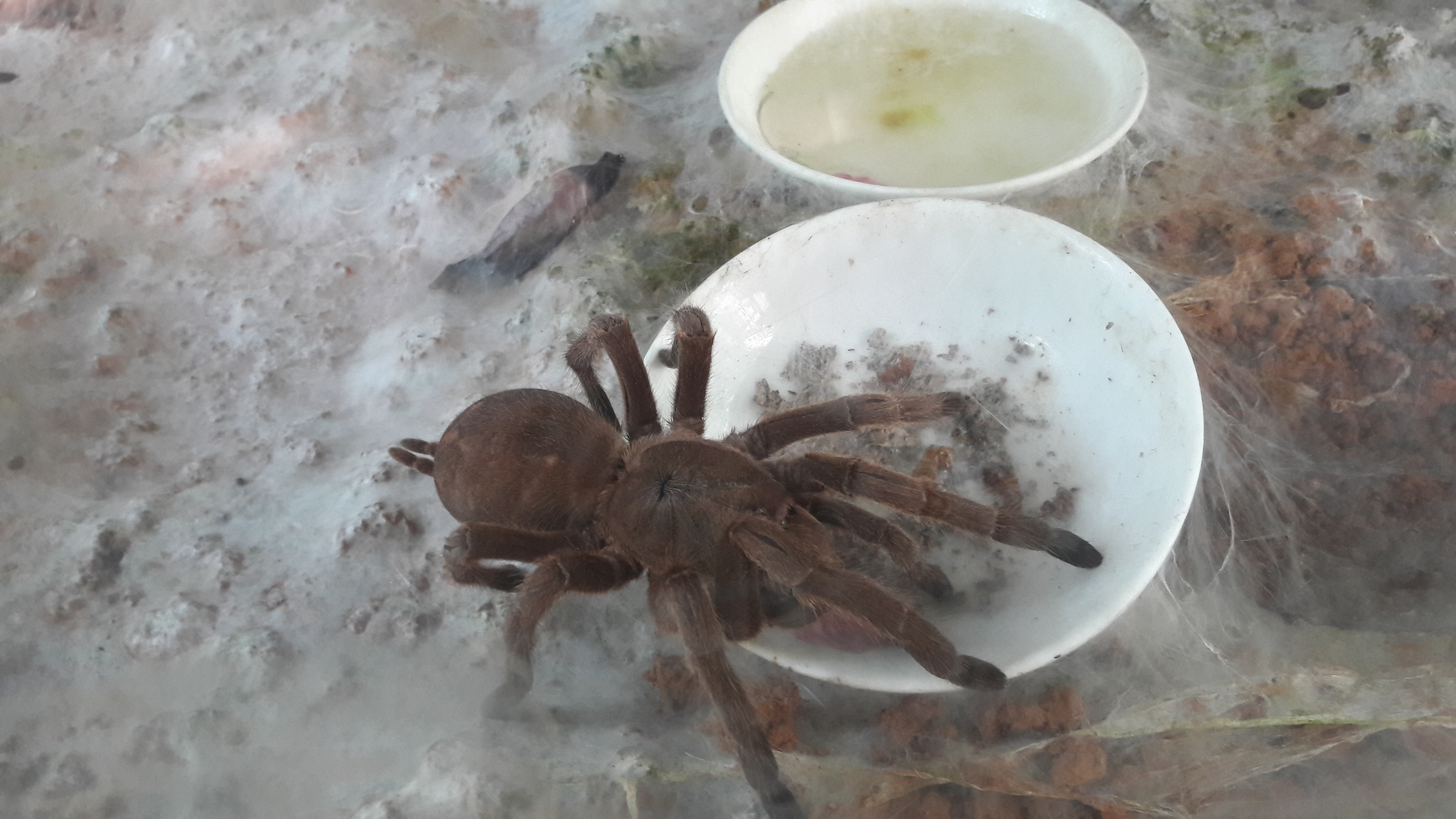
- Cyriopagopus schmidti

Scientific classification
- Kingdom: Animalia
- Phylum: Arthropoda
- Subphylum: Chelicerata
- Class: Arachnida
- Order: Araneae
- Infraorder: Mygalomorphae
- Family: Theraphosidae
- Genus: Cyriopagopus
- Species: C. schmidti

Binomial name
- Cyriopagopus schmidti von Wirth, 1991

Synonyms
- Haplopelma schmidti Wirth, 1991; Selenocosmia huwena Wang, Peng & Xie, 1993; Ornithoctonus huwena (Wang, Peng & Xie, 1993); Haplopelma huwenum (Wang, Peng & Xie, 1993); Melopoeus schmidti (Wirth, 1991)

= Cyriopagopus schmidti =

Species of spider

Cyriopagopus schmidti is a species of spider in the family Theraphosidae (tarantulas), found in China and Vietnam. It is one of a number of species known as "Chinese bird spider" and "Chinese earth tiger". Haplopelma huwenum was synonymized with this species in 2008. Spiders under this name and its synonyms have been shown to produce toxins called huwentoxins.

== Description ==
Cyriopagopus schmidti resembles C. hainanus, but can be distinguished by its dark yellow-brown body and the shorter length of the "thorns" on the forward-facing (prolateral) sides of the maxillae. The carapace (upper surface of the cephalothorax) is dark yellow-brown; the abdomen is similarly coloured, with black stripes running across it and a black stripe down the centre of the upper surface.

The female has been described as one of the largest Asian spiders, and is said to be able to live up to 30 years. It is between 53 and 85 mm long (body plus chelicerae). The first leg is longest, at about 69 mm; the third is the shortest, at about 54 mm. The spermatheca is M-shaped. The male is smaller, between 37 and 44 mm long (body plus chelicerae). The first leg is again the longest, at about 68 mm, with the third being the shortest, at about 52 mm. Thus, although the body is significantly smaller than that of the female, the male's legs are of a similar length. The tibiae of the first pair of legs have a spur on the forward-facing sides. The palpal bulb is pear-shaped, with a wide, curved embolus.

C. schmidti makes burrows, lined with silk, and often with silk alarm lines radiating from the mouth. The spider remains in its burrow during the day, emerging only at night to catch prey, mainly large insects.

== Taxonomy ==
The species was first described by V. von Wirth in 1991, as Haplopelma schmidti, based on a single female from Vietnam. Separately, J. F. Wang, X. J. Peng and L. P. Xie described Selenocosmia huwena in 1993, based on a female from Guangxi, China. In 2000, Günter Schmidt first synonymized the two, a decision confirmed by Ming-Sheng Zhu and Rui Zhang in 2008. In 2015, the species was moved to Cyriopagopus.

== Distribution and habitat ==
Cyriopagopus schmidti is known from Guangxi Province in south China and from neighbouring Vietnam. It is found on south-facing mountain slopes, steeply sloping at 60 to 85˚.
