= Ornithoctonus =

Scientific classification
- Kingdom: Animalia
- Phylum: Arthropoda
- Subphylum: Chelicerata
- Class: Arachnida
- Order: Araneae
- Infraorder: Mygalomorphae
- Family: Theraphosidae
- Genus: Ornithoctonus; Pocock, 1892

Type species
- O. andersoni Pocock, 1892

Species
- O. andersoni Pocock, 1892 – Myanmar; O. aureotibialis von Wirth & Striffler, 2005 – Thailand; O. costalis (Schmidt, 1998) – Thailand

Genus of spiders

Ornithoctonus is a genus of Southeast Asian tarantulas that was first described by Reginald Innes Pocock in 1892. As of May 2020 it contains three species, found in Thailand and Myanmar: O. andersoni, O. aureotibialis, and O. costalis.
