= Cyriopagopus paganus =

Scientific classification
- Kingdom: Animalia
- Phylum: Arthropoda
- Subphylum: Chelicerata
- Class: Arachnida
- Order: Araneae
- Infraorder: Mygalomorphae
- Family: Theraphosidae
- Genus: Cyriopagopus
- Species: C. paganus

Binomial name
- Cyriopagopus paganus Simon, 1887

Species of tarantula

Cyriopagopus paganus is a tarantula which was first described by Eugène Simon in 1887. They can be found in Thailand, Vietnam, and Myanmar. They are burrowers, being found in this area, inside their burrows, waiting for prey.

== Description ==
They have a grayish-black carapace, with grayish-black legs, except for the femur, which is a deep black. The opisthosoma is also a grayish-black color, with a deep black fishbone pattern. It looks somewhat similar to the Cyriopagopus vonwirthi tarantula, except Cyriopagopus paganus is darker, and lacks some of the skeletal coloration. Though Cyriopagopus vonwirthi coloration is also dependent on the locality it was found in, some times either of this species are mislabeled for one another.

== Habitat ==
They are found in the rainforests of Thailand, Vietnam, and Myanmar, originally being found in Dawei. It is found in areas with a tropical monsoon climate, where temperature averages 27°C, and average yearly rainfall is 1400mm. The area is home to plants such as Habropetalum dawei, and the Lotus Flower.

== Behavior ==
They are burrowers, making silk-lined burrow, but they will also make use of any available hide. They are quite defensive tarantulas, if cornered and unable to flee, they will attempt to bite. They are an old world species.
