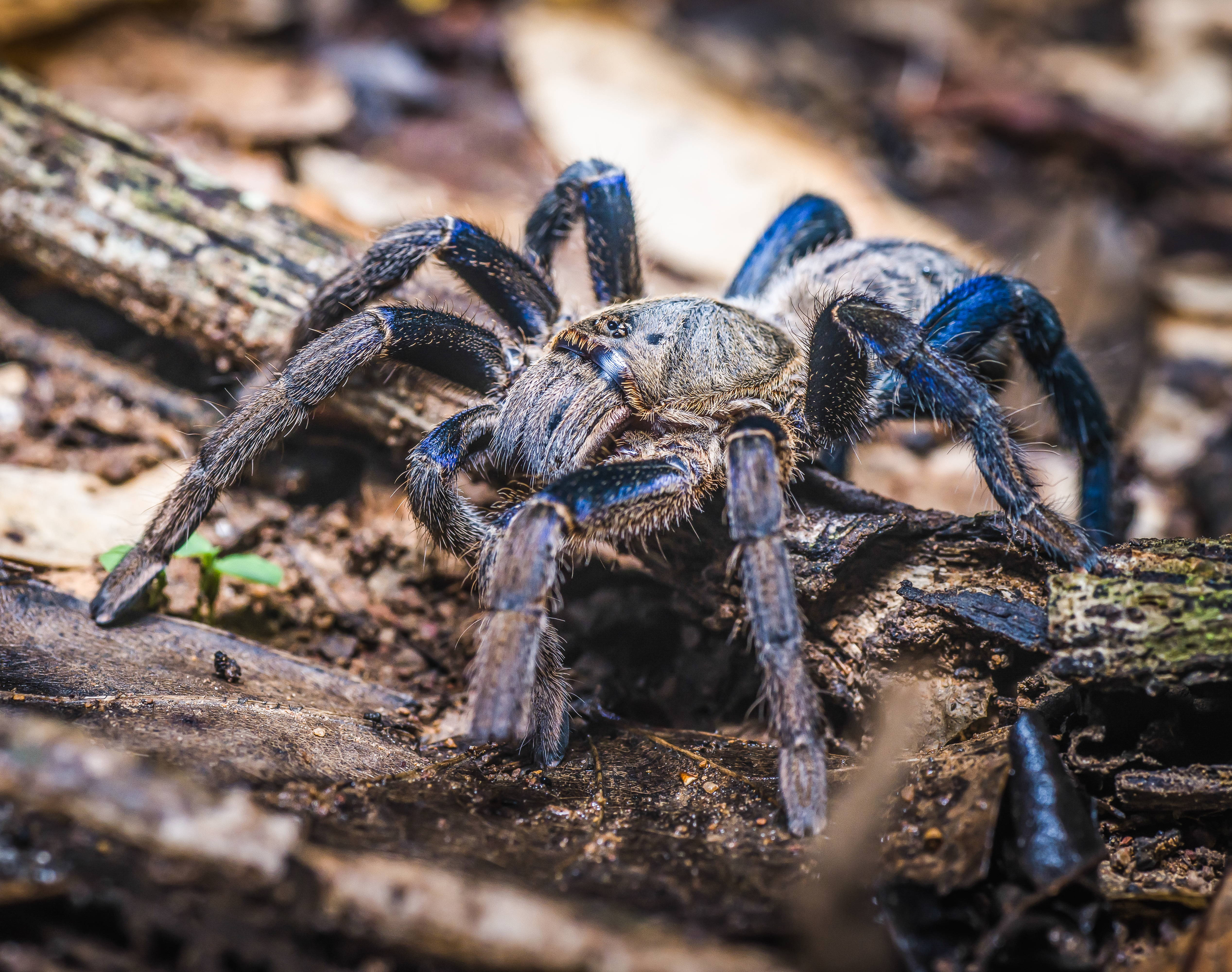
- In Kaeng Krachan District, Phetchaburi, Thailand

Scientific classification
- Kingdom: Animalia
- Phylum: Arthropoda
- Subphylum: Chelicerata
- Class: Arachnida
- Order: Araneae
- Infraorder: Mygalomorphae
- Family: Theraphosidae
- Genus: Cyriopagopus
- Species: C. lividus

Binomial name
- Cyriopagopus lividus (Smith, 1996)

Synonyms
- Haplopelma lividum Smith, 1996

= Cobalt blue tarantula =

Species of spider

The cobalt blue tarantula or Cyriopagopus lividus is a species of tarantula which is in the family Theraphosidae which is native to Myanmar and over the border into Thailand. It was originally described as Haplopelma lividum.

== Description ==
The cobalt blue tarantula is a medium-sized tarantula with a leg span around 13 cm (5.1 in). It is noted for its iridescent blue legs and light gray prosoma and opisthosoma, the latter of which may contain darker gray chevrons. Males and females look the same until the ultimate (final) molt of the males. At this point, the male exhibits sexual dimorphism in the form of a light tan or bronze coloration and legginess. Additionally, males gain a palpal bulb on the pedipalps and tibial apophyses (mating hooks). The female eventually becomes larger than the male and lives years longer. The cobalt blue tarantula is a fossorial species and spends nearly all of its time in deep burrows of its own construction.

The venom of the tarantula is not enough to kill a human, but bites can be extremely painful. In a 2001 case study from Japan, two people bitten by a pet cobalt blue taruntula reported severe pain and inflammation, which went away after several hours. One individual experienced stiffness for a few weeks after being bitten. The venom contains glutamic acid, at 0.97% concentration. Histamine and adenosine were detected at 0.14% and 0.10% with the polyamine spermine noted in trace amounts at 0.002%.

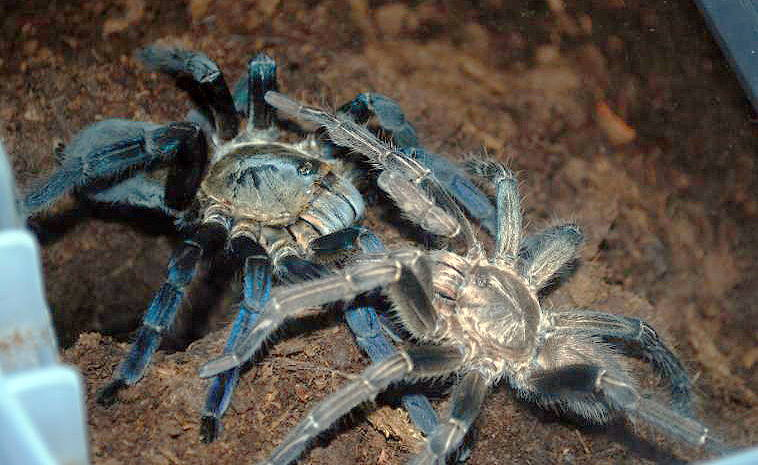
A female (left) and male (right) in courtship in captivity

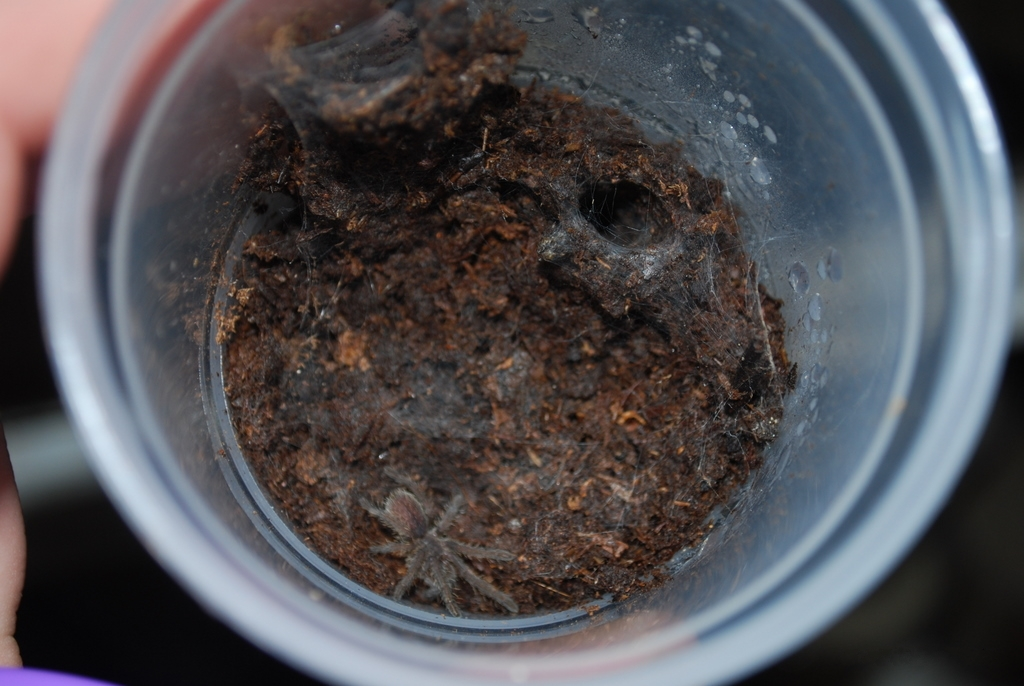
A second-instar spiderling cobalt blue tarantula near burrow

== Habitat ==
Cobalt blue tarantulas inhabit the tropical rainforests of Southeast Asia, where they construct deep burrows, and generally only leave them to find food.

== Pets ==
The cobalt blue tarantula is a mainstay in the pet trade, despite being a fast and defensive tarantula with potent venom. Bites from this species can result in severe muscle cramps and inflammation.
