= Hainantoxin =

Hainantoxins (HNTX) are neurotoxins from the venom of the Chinese bird spider Cyriopagopus hainanus. Hainantoxins specifically inhibit tetrodotoxin-sensitive Voltage-gated sodium channels, thereby causing blockage of neuromuscular transmission and paralysis. Currently, 13 different hainantoxins are known (HNTX-I – HNTX-XIII), but only HNTX-I, -II, -III, -IV and -V have been investigated in detail.

== Sources ==
HNTX-I, HNTX-III, HNTX-IV and HNTX-V are made by the Chinese bird spider Haplopelma hainanum (=Ornithoctonus hainana, Selenocosmia hainana).

== Chemistry ==
=== Structure ===
Hainantoxins I, III, IV and V show high homology, including the presence of three disulfide bonds that form an inhibitor cysteine knot (ICK) motif.

==== HNTX-I ====
The main component of the venom of O. hainana is HNTX-I. It has 33 amino acid residues, with a total molecular weight of 3605-3608 Da. HNTX-I contains a short triple-stranded anti-parallel beta-sheet and four beta-turns. The amino acid residues His28 and Asp26 are needed for the bioactivity of HNTX-I.

==== HNTX-II ====
HNTX-II has a molecular weight of 4253 Da and contains 37 amino acid residues. The complete amino acid sequence of HNTX-II is NH2-LFECSV SCEIEK EGNKD CKKKK CKGGW KCKFN MCVKV-COOH.

==== HNTX-III ====
The structure of HNTX-III consists of 33-35 amino acid residues, which form a beta-sheet with connections between Asp7 and Cys9, Tyr21 and Ser23, and Lys27 and Val30.

==== HNTX-IV ====
HNTX-IV has 35 amino acid residues with a total molecular weight of 3989 Da. The first strand consists of an antiparallel beta-sheet. The complete amino acid sequence of HNTX-IV is NH2-ECLGFG KGCNPS NDQCCK SSNLVC SRKHRW CKYEI-CONH2. Lys 27, His28, Arg29 and Lys 32 are the neuroactive amino acid residues.

==== HNTX-V ====
HNTX-V consists of 35 amino acid residues. The whole amino acid residue sequence of HNTX-V is NH2-ECLGFG KGCNPS NDQCCK SANLVC SRKHRW CKYEI-COOH. At the active binding site of HNTX-V, Lys27 and Arg 29 are the most important.

== Target ==
=== Channel ===
Hainantoxins selectively inhibit tetrodotoxin-sensitive (TTX-S) voltage-gated sodium channels (VGSCs). Voltage-gated Ca2+ channels (VGCCs), tetrodotoxin-resistant (TTX-R) VGSCs and rectifier-delayed potassium channels are not affected. HNTX-III and HNTX-IV are part of the Huwentoxin-I family. Toxins from the Huwentoxin-I family are thought to bind to site 1 on the sodium channels. Other hainantoxins bind at site 3 of the sodium channels. HNTX-I specifically blocks mammalian Nav1.2 and insect para/tipE channels expressed in Xenopus laevis oocytes. HNTX-I is a weak antagonist of the vertebrate TTX-S VGSCs, but is more potent on insect VGSCs.

=== Affinity ===
For the blockage of sodium channels, electrostatic interactions or hydrogen bonds are needed. Important for the electrostatic interaction is the presence of a positively charged region in the toxin, because the receptor site of the sodium channel contains a lot of negatively charged residues. In HNTX-I, the positively charged residues and a vicinal hydrophobic patch have most influence on the binding to the sodium channels. HNTX-IV has a positively charged patch containing the amino acids Arg26, Lys27, His28, Arg29 and Lys32, of which Lys27, Arg29 and Lys32 are the most important for interaction with the TTX-S VGSCs. HNTX-V also shows an interface of positively charged amino acids that are responsible for the binding with the TTX-S VGSCs, where also Lys27 and Arg29 are the most important. Subtle differences in the positively charged patch can result in altered electrostatic properties, causing altered pharmacological effects.

Table 1: IC50 values of four subgroups of hainantoxins

	IC50
HNTX-I	68 μM
HNTX-III	1.1 nM
HNTX-IV	44.6 nM
HNTX-V	42.3 nM

== Mode of action ==
HNTX-I, HNTX-III, HNTX-IV, and HNTX-V are thought to bind to site 1 of voltage-dependent sodium channels, similar to TTX, and thereby block the channel pore. They do not alter activation and inactivation kinetics. Ion selectivity of the VGSCs is not changed by hainantoxin. The mode of action of HNTX-II is unclear, but is unlikely to involve sodium channels.

== Toxicity ==
=== Symptoms ===
Hainantoxins can affect both vertebrates and invertebrates. HNTX-I has no significant effect on insects or rats. HNTX-III and HNTX-IV cause spontaneous contractions of the diaphragm muscle and the vas deferens smooth muscle of the rat. HNTX-III and HNTX-IV are able to paralyze cockroaches, and HNTX-IV can even paralyze rats.

=== LD_{50} ===
Intracerebroventricular injection in mice with HNTX-II shows an LD_{50} of 1.41 μg/g. The intraperitoneal LD_{50} value of HNTX-IV in mice is 0.2 mg/kg. HNTX-III is 40 times more potent than HNTX-IV.

== Therapeutic use ==
HNTX-III and HNTX-IV have an antagonistic effect on the toxin BMK-I, a toxic protein in the venom of the scorpion Buthus martensii.
