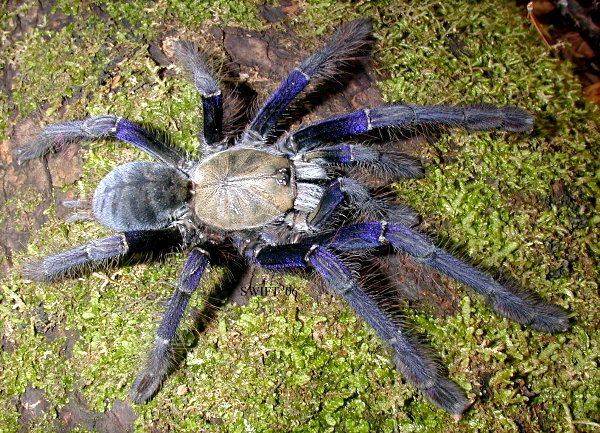
- An Omothymus violaceopes tarantula.

Scientific classification
- Kingdom: Animalia
- Phylum: Arthropoda
- Subphylum: Chelicerata
- Class: Arachnida
- Order: Araneae
- Infraorder: Mygalomorphae
- Family: Theraphosidae
- Genus: Omothymus; Thorell, 1891

Type species
- Omothymus schioedtei Thorell, 1891

= Omothymus =

Genus of spiders

Omothymus is a genus of spiders in the family Theraphosidae, found in Malaysia, Indonesia and Singapore.

== Description ==
This genus can be distinguished from others thanks to their reproductive organs. They can be distinguished from Phormingochilus by the pointed apex of the embolus. They can also be distinguished by the length of leg 1 and 4, and by their distribution, being found in Malaysia, Singapore and Sumatra, Indonesia.

== Species ==
As of July 2022, the World Spider Catalog accepted the following species:

- Omothymus fuchsi Strand, 1906 - Indonesia
- Omothymus rafni Gabriel & Sherwood, 2019 - Indonesia
- Omothymus schioedtei Thorell, 1891 (type species) - Malaysia
- Omothymus violaceopes Abraham, 1924 - Malaysia and Singapore

=== In synonymy ===
Omothymus thorelli Simon, 1901 = Omothymus schioedtei Thorell, 1891
