= Phormingochilus =

Scientific classification
- Kingdom: Animalia
- Phylum: Arthropoda
- Subphylum: Chelicerata
- Class: Arachnida
- Order: Araneae
- Infraorder: Mygalomorphae
- Family: Theraphosidae
- Genus: Phormingochilus; Pocock, 1895

Type species
- P. everetti Pocock, 1895

Species
- 5, see text

Genus of spiders

Phormingochilus is a genus of Bornean tarantulas that was first described by Reginald Innes Pocock in 1895. They are occasionally kept as exotic pets, and are known for moving in bursts of speed and being defensive when cornered.

== Diagnosis ==
They can be distinguished by the round apex of the male palpal bulb, they can also be distinguished by the size of leg 1 and 4 in females. Further more, they can only be found in Borneo and Sulawesi.

== Species ==
As of December 2024 contains five species, found on Borneo and Sulawesi:

- Phormingochilus arboricola (Schmidt & Barensteiner, 2015) – Borneo
- Phormingochilus everetti Pocock, 1895 (type) – Borneo
- Phormingochilus hatihati (Müller, Fardiansah, et al, 2024) - Sulawesi
- Phormingochilus pennellhewlettorum Smith & Jacobi, 2015 – Malaysia (Borneo)
- Phormingochilus tigrinus Pocock, 1895 – Borneo

Formerly included:

- P. carpenteri Smith & Jacobi, 2015 → Lampropelma carpenteri
- P. fuchsi Strand, 1906 → Omothymus fuchsi
- P. kirki Smith & Jacobi, 2015 → Lampropelma carpenteri
