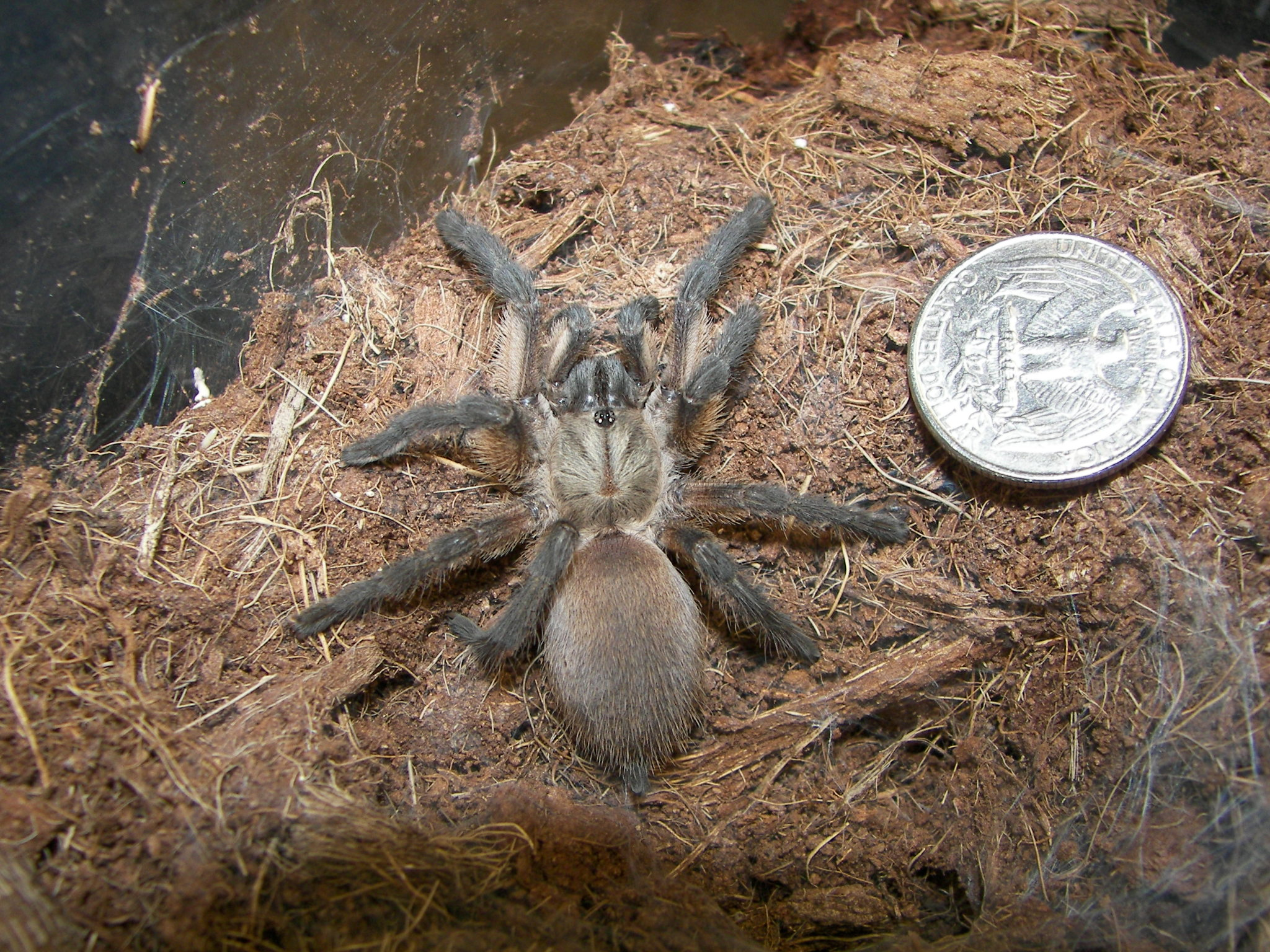
- Monocentropus balfouri

Scientific classification
- Kingdom: Animalia
- Phylum: Arthropoda
- Subphylum: Chelicerata
- Class: Arachnida
- Order: Araneae
- Infraorder: Mygalomorphae
- Family: Theraphosidae
- Subfamily: Eumenophorinae; Pocock, 1897

Genera
- See text.

= Eumenophorinae =

Subfamily of tarantulas

The Eumenophorinae are a subfamily of tarantula spiders (family Theraphosidae). They are known from genera distributed across Sub-Saharan Africa, the south of the Arabian peninsula, Madagascar and its associated islands, and parts of India.

== Distribution ==
At about 158-160 million years ago (Mya), Gondwana split up and the Indo-Madagascan plate drifted away from the rest of the super continent. At around 84-86 Mya, India split from Madagascar and drifted into Eurasia (66-55 Mya), to its current position. Therefore, all fauna in Gondwana (such as the Eumenophorinae) would be distributed on all three land masses.

== Characteristics ==
The Eumenophorinae have stridulatory spike setae on the coxae of all legs, and a "comb" of stiffened setae on the palpal femur. In 2005, Richard Gallon described the monotypic genus Mascaraneus, which lacks the stridulatory spike setae.

== Taxonomy ==
The monophyly of the Eumenophorinae has been confirmed in a number of molecular phylogenetic studies. However, these have included relatively few of the genera that have been placed in the subfamily at one time or another. A 2014 study included Anoploscelus and Phoneyusa. A 2018 study included Hysterocrates, Monocentropus and Pelinobius.

=== Genera ===
Genera that have been placed in the subfamily Eumenophorinae by various sources include:

- Annandaliella Hirst, 1909
- Anoploscelus Pocock, 1897
- Batesiella Pocock, 1903
- Encyocrates Simon, 1892
- Eumenophorus Pocock, 1897
- Heterophrictus Pocock, 1900
- Heteroscodra Pocock, 1900
- Hysterocrates Simon, 1892
- Loxomphalia Simon, 1889
- Loxoptygus Simon, 1903
- Mascaraneus Gallon, 2005
- Monocentropus Pocock, 1897
- Myostola Simon, 1903
- Neoheterophrictus Siliwal & Raven, 2012
- Pelinobius Karsch, 1885 (as Citharischius Pocock, 1900)
- Phoneyusa Karsch, 1884
- Plesiophrictus Pocock, 1899
- Sahydroaraneus Mirza & Sanap, 2014
- Stromatopelma Karsch, 1881
