= Euphrictus squamosus =

Scientific classification
- Kingdom: Animalia
- Phylum: Arthropoda
- Subphylum: Chelicerata
- Class: Arachnida
- Order: Araneae
- Infraorder: Mygalomorphae
- Family: Theraphosidae
- Genus: Euphrictus
- Species: E. squamosus

Binomial name
- Euphrictus squamosus (Benoit, 1965)

Species of spider

Euphrictus squamosus is a tarantula (family Theraphosidae) in the Selenogyrinae subfamily. It is native to the Congo.

== Taxonomy ==
The species was first described by Pierre Benoit in 1965 as the type species, Zophopelma squamosa, of a new genus Zophopelma, placed in the family Barychelidae. After analysing its features, Robert J. Raven considered the species to belong to the family Theraphosidae rather than Barychelidae, and also transferred it to the genus Euphrictus as E. squamosus. The transfer has been accepted by most sources, but Andrew M. Smith in 1990, although agreeing with the changed family placement, questioned Raven's view that Zophopelma and Euphrictus are synonymous.

== Characteristics ==
Euphrictus squamosus is characterized by yellow-white scales on its cephalothorax, for both genders. It has a slightly shorter embolus than Euphrictus spinosus. It is 11.4 mm long and reddish-brown in colour.
