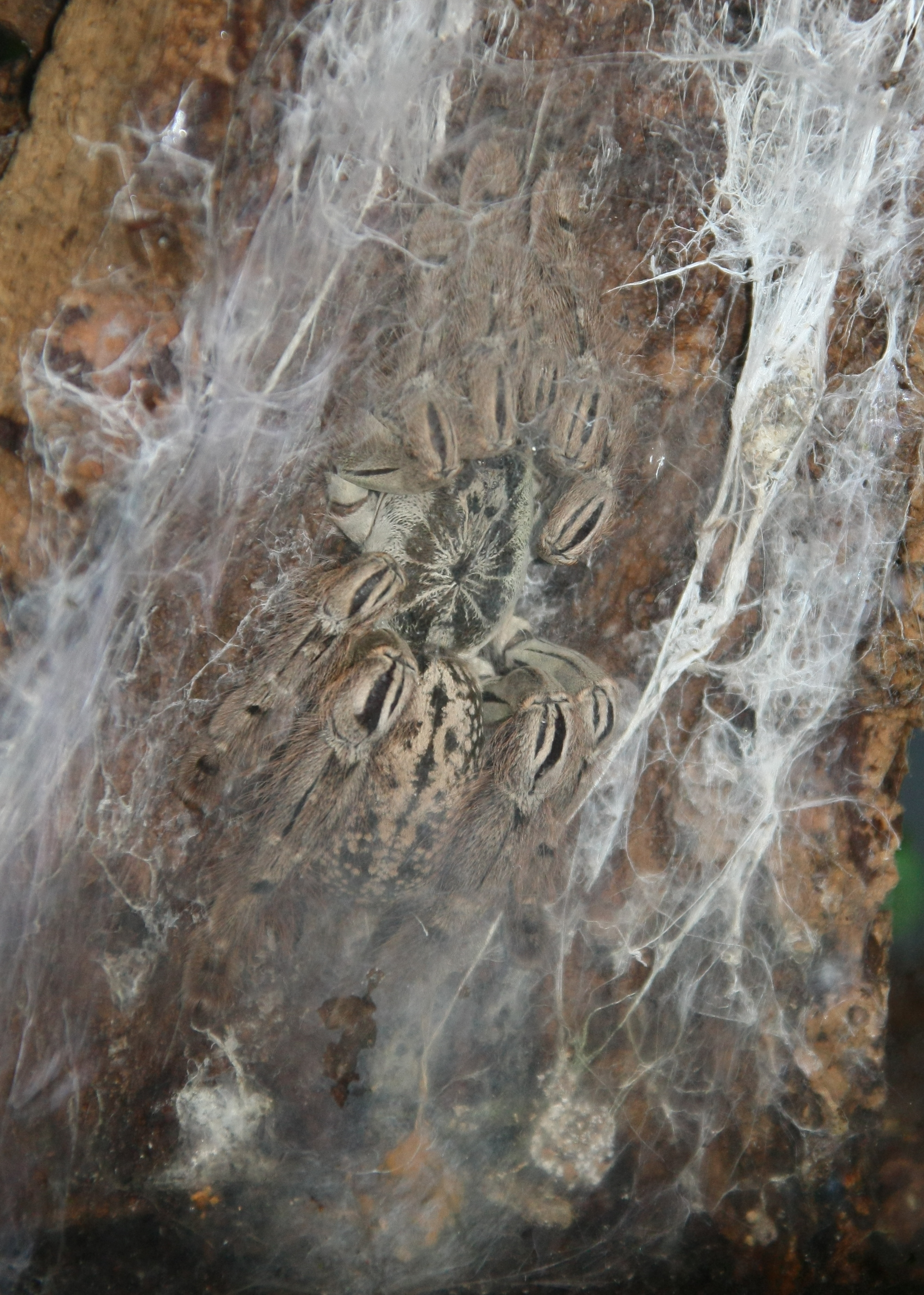
- Heteroscodra maculata

Scientific classification
- Kingdom: Animalia
- Phylum: Arthropoda
- Subphylum: Chelicerata
- Class: Arachnida
- Order: Araneae
- Infraorder: Mygalomorphae
- Family: Theraphosidae
- Subfamily: Stromatopelminae; Schmidt, 1993

Genera
- See text.

= Stromatopelminae =

Subfamily of tarantulas

The Stromatopelminae are a subfamily of tarantulas native to West Africa and part of Central Africa. The subfamily was first proposed by Günter Schmidt in 1993.

== Taxonomy ==
The subfamily Stromatopelminae was first proposed by Günter Schmidt in 1993. The genera he included had been placed in the subfamily Eumenophorinae by Raven in 1985. Schmidt excluded them as they did not have the typical stridulating organ on the coxa and trochanter of the palps and legs which are present in Eumenophorinae. The subfamily was recovered as monophyletic in both a 2018 and a 2019 study, sister to the subfamily Harpactirinae.

=== Genera ===
Schmidt included two genera, both found in tropical West and Central Africa. Both genera were included in the 2019 study that found the subfamily to be monophyletic.

- Heteroscodra Pocock, 1899
- Stromatopelma Karsch, 1881

Gallon in 2005 also placed the monotypic genus Encyocratella in the subfamily. The genus was not found to be part of the subfamily in a 2018 Master's dissertation, which treated it as incertae sedis as regards subfamily. It was not included in the 2018 and 2019 studies which found the subfamily to be monophyletic.

== Distribution and habitat ==
These arboreal tarantulas are often found dwelling in palm trees native to the West African region.
