= Selenogyrus caeruleus =

Scientific classification
- Kingdom: Animalia
- Phylum: Arthropoda
- Subphylum: Chelicerata
- Class: Arachnida
- Order: Araneae
- Infraorder: Mygalomorphae
- Family: Theraphosidae
- Genus: Selenogyrus
- Species: S. caeruleus

Binomial name
- Selenogyrus caeruleus Pocock, 1897

Species of spider

Selenogyrus caeruleus is a species of tarantula (family Theraphosidae, subfamily Selenogyrinae) native to Sierra Leone.

== Characteristics ==
Selenogyrus caeruleus has characteristic colouration; grey brown with metallic blue reflections. The labio-sternum mounds are weakly defined and the stridulating organ on the inner side of the chelicerae is present and formed of long clavate (scimitar shaped) setae. The tarsal scopulae are separated by a band of setae. It is 44 mm long. Metatarsal and tarsal segments of legs 3 and 4 are heavily spined. The female's spermathecae are stouter at the base than S. austini.
