= Annandaliella pectinifera =

Scientific classification
- Kingdom: Animalia
- Phylum: Arthropoda
- Subphylum: Chelicerata
- Class: Arachnida
- Order: Araneae
- Infraorder: Mygalomorphae
- Family: Theraphosidae
- Genus: Annandaliella
- Species: A. pectinifera

Binomial name
- Annandaliella pectinifera Gravely, 1935

Species of spider

Annandaliella pectinifera is a species of tarantula, a type of spider, in the subfamily Selenogyrinae. It is endemic to India.

== Taxonomy ==
Fredrick Gravely described this species in 1935, placing it in the Ischnocolinae simply because "it seemed undesirable to form a special subfamily for so small a genus". But now that the Selenogyrinae has been created, it has now been placed in this subfamily.

== Characteristics ==
Annandaliella pectinifera has stout stridulatory setae on the inside of both chelicerae, to form a primitive stridulatory organ, in the young and male specimens as well as the females. The male has unique colouration: brown, deepening in darkness as the height gets lower, and the underside having long golden hairs and reddish hair on the margin of the chelicerae. The embolus is long and slender, but is not very evenly curved and very curved at all.
