= Selenogyrus aureus =

Scientific classification
- Kingdom: Animalia
- Phylum: Arthropoda
- Subphylum: Chelicerata
- Class: Arachnida
- Order: Araneae
- Infraorder: Mygalomorphae
- Family: Theraphosidae
- Genus: Selenogyrus
- Species: S. aureus

Binomial name
- Selenogyrus aureus Pocock, 1897

Species of spider

Selenogyrus aureus is a species of tarantula, in the subfamily Selenogyrinae. It is endemic Sierra Leone.

== Diagnosis ==
Selenogyrus aureus lacks a stridulatory organ between the chelicerae. The male is known only. There is no clypeus and there is a covering of soft tissue on the chelicerae. It has a uniform brownish-yellow colour, with golden tinge. It is 31mm long.
