= Selenogyrus =

Scientific classification
- Kingdom: Animalia
- Phylum: Arthropoda
- Subphylum: Chelicerata
- Class: Arachnida
- Order: Araneae
- Infraorder: Mygalomorphae
- Family: Theraphosidae
- Subfamily: Selenogyrinae
- Genus: Selenogyrus; Pocock, 1897

Species
- See text

Genus of spiders

Selenogyrus is a genus of spider, or more specifically, selenogyrine theraphosid. The type species is Selenogyrus caeruleus.

== Characteristic features ==
Selenogyrus has no rastellum (spines for digging) on the front of the chelicerae. This distinguishes it from Euphrictus. The stridulatory setae on the chelicerae are clavate (scimitar shaped).

== Species ==
- Selenogyrus africanus
- Selenogyrus aureus
- Selenogyrus austini
- Selenogyrus brunneus
- Selenogyrus caeruleus
