= Selenogyrus africanus =

Scientific classification
- Kingdom: Animalia
- Phylum: Arthropoda
- Subphylum: Chelicerata
- Class: Arachnida
- Order: Araneae
- Infraorder: Mygalomorphae
- Family: Theraphosidae
- Genus: Selenogyrus
- Species: S. africanus

Binomial name
- Selenogyrus africanus Simon, 1887

Species of spider

Selenogyrus africanus is a species of tarantula, which is native to the Ivory Coast and is a member of the Selenogyrinae subfamily.

== Description ==
Female Selenogyrus africanus have procurved foveae, and many spines on the labium. The cephalothorax is 12mm long and 9.4mm wide. It has some long, thick greyish-yellow hairs. The abdomen is 15mm long and 10mm wide. It is black, with long grey hairs.

== Taxonomy ==
Selenogyrus africanus was originally described as Hapalopus africanus by Eugène Simon in 1889, but Reginald Innes Pocock, in 1897, recognized that it had all the characteristics of Selenogyrus and placed it in that genus. Andrew Smith claimed that Selenogyrus africanus "is in urgent need of redescription".
