= Selenogyrus brunneus =

Scientific classification
- Kingdom: Animalia
- Phylum: Arthropoda
- Subphylum: Chelicerata
- Class: Arachnida
- Order: Araneae
- Infraorder: Mygalomorphae
- Family: Theraphosidae
- Genus: Selenogyrus
- Species: S. brunneus

Binomial name
- Selenogyrus brunneus Strand, 1907

Species of spider

Selenogyrus brunneus is a species of tarantula (family Theraphosidae, subfamily Selenogyrinae), found in West Africa (likely Togo).

== Characteristics ==
S. brunneus is brown with greyish-olive green hairs and is about 50mm long. Foveal groove procurved. Embrik Strand gave no further details in his description of the species (other than the eye arrangement and spination).
