= Annandaliella ernakulamensis =

Scientific classification
- Kingdom: Animalia
- Phylum: Arthropoda
- Subphylum: Chelicerata
- Class: Arachnida
- Order: Araneae
- Infraorder: Mygalomorphae
- Family: Theraphosidae
- Genus: Annandaliella
- Species: A. ernakulamensis

Binomial name
- Annandaliella ernakulamensis Jose & Sebastian, 2008

Species of spider

Annandaliella ernakulamensis is a species of tarantula (family Theraphosidae) in the subfamily Selenogyrinae. It is one of three species in the genus Annandaliella and the first to be described in 73 years. It is native to Ernakulam, Kerala State, India.

== Etymology ==
The specific name of this tarantula, ermakulmensis, honors the type locality, Ermakulam.

== Characteristics ==
Annandaliella ermakulamensis has three peg-like setae on the inside of the chelicerae, a tibial comb consisting of long black setae on a tibial apophysis (i.e. a protrusion), and a long, tapering embolus without any apical keels. It is reddish brown, but on the cephalothorax it has thick dark bands radiating from the fovea, a grove in the center of the cephalothorax, to the coxae of the legs and the ocularium.
