= Myostola =

Scientific classification
- Kingdom: Animalia
- Phylum: Arthropoda
- Subphylum: Chelicerata
- Class: Arachnida
- Order: Araneae
- Infraorder: Mygalomorphae
- Family: Theraphosidae
- Genus: Myostola; Simon, 1903
- Species: M. occidentalis

Binomial name
- Myostola occidentalis (Lucas, 1858)

Synonyms
- Species: Mygale occidentalis Lucas, 1858; Phoneyusa occidentalis Pocock, 1899

Genus of spiders

Myostola is a spider genus in the family Theraphosidae (tarantulas), with the sole species Myostola occidentalis, found in Gabon and Cameroon.

== Description ==
Myostola occidentalis is basically dark brown, with pale rose-coloured hairs on the joints of the palps and legs. The female's body, including the mandibles, is around 62 mm (2.4 in) long; the male is smaller, at around 37 mm (1.5 in) and lighter in colour.

== Taxonomy ==
Myostola occidentalis was first described by Hippolyte Lucas in 1858. He placed it in the now obsolete genus Mygale as Mygale occidentalis, comparing it to the New World species Mygale cancerides (now Phormictopus cancerides). In 1899, Reginald Innes Pocock transferred the species to the African genus Phoneyusa. In 1892, Eugène Simon gave a description of the genus Pelinobius, but in 1903 realized that the species he used for the description was actually very different from the type species of Pelinobius (P. muticus) and was probably identical to Lucas's Mygale occidentalis. Accordingly, Simon provided a new genus name, Myostola, to replace his version of Pelinobius. Simon's decision to place M. occidentalis in a separate genus, rather than in Phoneyusa, was supported by Robert Raven in 1985.

== Distribution ==
Myostola occidentalis is found in Gabon and Cameroon, in West Africa.
