= Π-Theraphotoxin-Hm3a =

Spider toxin

π-Theraphotoxin-Hm3a
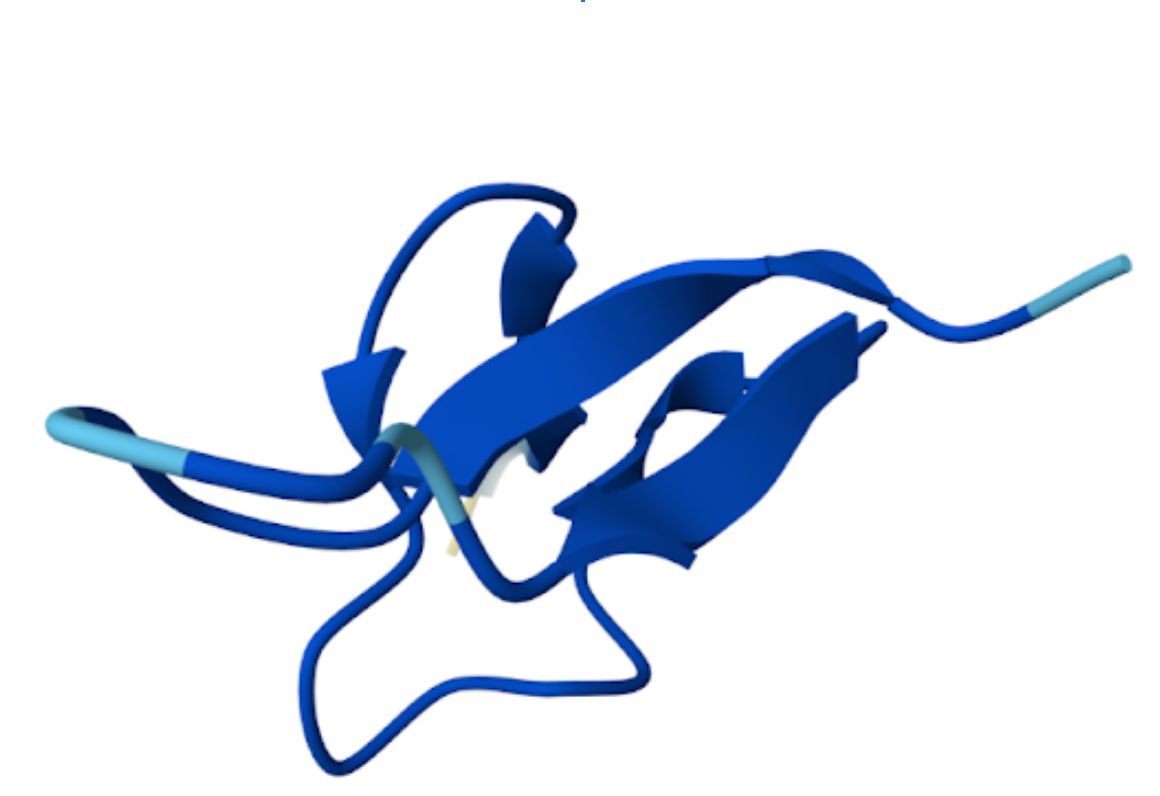
- Predicted structure of the Hm3a peptide generated by AlphaFold. Colors correspond to the pLDDT, ie the model’s confidence in the structure

Identifiers
- Organism: Heteroscodra maculata
- Symbol: Hm3a
- UniProt: C0HKD0
Search for
- Structures: Swiss-model
- Domains: InterPro

π-Theraphotoxin-Hm3a (also called π-TRTX-Hm3a, or H3ma) is a 37-amino-peptide toxin derived from the venom of Togo starburst tarantula or baboon spider (Heteroscodra maculata). Hm3a is structurally close to well-researched Psalmotoxin (PcTx1) and represents one of the few spider-derived ligands that target acid-sensing ion channels (ASICs).

== Etymology and source ==
"π" (Pi) in π-Theraphotoxin-Hm3a signifies that the toxin acts on ion channels that are permeable to protons (such as ASICs), "therapotoxin" refers to its origin from a theraphosidae spider family, and "Hm3a" indicates the species name Heteroscodra maculata, as well as the fact that it is the third peptide purified from its venom.

== Chemistry and stability ==
Hm3a is a 37-amino acid peptide stabilized by three disulfide bonds that likely fold it into an inhibitor cystine knot (ICK) structure, a common motif among spider toxins that gives it a strong resistance to heat and enzymatic breakdown. It belongs to the Theraphotoxin family, and shares ~82% of sequence with PcTx1. The slight structural difference might be a reason why Hm3a is more stable than PcTx1 in experimental settings; with ~87% of intact Hm3a peptide after 48h in human serum, compared to ~35% of intact PcTx1 and ~40% of oxytocin (clinical control). It also appears to have greater thermal stability, with ~10% loss after 48h in phosphate-buffered saline at ~55 °C compared to a ~24% loss of PcTx1 and ~38% loss of oxytocin.

Its theoretical monoisotopic mass (oxidized form) is 4285 Da. Its sequence is:

EPCIPKWKSCVNRHGDCCAGLECWKRRKSFEVCVPKV

== Target ==
Hm3a primarily acts on ASICs (members of the DEG/ENaC family), which are ion channels that detect decreases in extracellular pH, and allow sodium to flow inside the cell as a response to protonation. There are six ASIC isoforms (ASIC1a, ASIC1b, ASIC2a, ASIC2b, ASIC3 and ASIC4), but Hm3a is highly selective to ASIC1 subunits, strongly inhibiting ASIC1a and potentiating ASC1b, with negligible activity on ASIC2a or ASIC3 at concentrations up to 10μM.

Main effect of Hm3a (recombinant) on ASIC receptors for rat and human variants
Channel Subtype	Effect	Potency
rASIC1a	Inhibition	IC_{50} = 1.3 ± 0.2 nM
rASIC1b	Potentiation	EC_{50} = 46.5 ± 6.2 nM
rASIC1a/1b (heteromeric)	Potentiation	EC_{50} = 17.4 ± 0.5 nM
hASIC1a	Inhibition	IC_{50} = 39.7 ± 1.1 nM
hASIC1b	Potentiation	EC_{50} = 178.1 ± 1.3 nM

As the recombinant Hm3a has a smaller potency compared to PcTx1, a mutant version was designed (Hm3a_P38) with the addition of a proline at the C-terminus. Such recombinant yields a 3.3-fold increase in potency on ASIC1a compared to the Hm3a wild type. This increased potency indicates the possibility of using Hm3a as a template for designing effective therapeutic tools.

Comparison of the potency of Hm3a recombinant and Hm3a mutant on ASIC1a
Variant	Effect	Potency
Hm3a_WT (wild type)	Inhibition	IC_{50} = 1.3 ± 0.2 nM
Hm3a_P38 (mutant)	Inhibition	IC_{50} = 0.4 ± 0.1 nM

At concentrations up to 10μM, Hm3a shows no effect on several rat voltage-gated ion channels, including NaV1.2 (SCN2A), KV10.1 (KCNH1), and KV11.1 (KCNH2), indicating high selectivity for ASICs.

== Mode of action ==
The mode of action of Hm3a is similar to that of PcTx1. Hm3a mimics the interaction of protons with ASIC1a by binding into ASIC1a’s acidic pocket, which stabilizes the channel in a non-conducting state known as steady-state desensitization (SSD). In SSD, no ion flow occurs despite continued exposure to acidic conditions. Under normal circumstances, SSD occurs during sustained mild acidosis and reverses as the extracellular pH returns to neutral. Hm3a shifts the pH of SSD towards more alkaline values, promoting desensitization of ASICs even at near-neutral pH.

In contrast, binding of Hm3a to ASIC1b slows channel desensitization and stabilizes the open state, resulting in increased sodium flux into the cell.

== Therapeutic use ==
ASICs normally contribute to the detection of tissue acidosis in mammals by triggering appropriate pain and protective responses. However, excessive or prolonged activation can lead to neuronal injury and cell death.

As some spiders secrete a wide range of toxins in their venom, including ASIC-modulating toxins, toxin isolation and analysis is valuable for designing therapeutic tools aimed at decreasing dysfunctional ASIC activity through selective inhibition or potentiation.

While Hm3a has not been tested clinically, its potency, ASIC1 subtype selectivity, and high biological stability make it valuable as a research tool for this purpose. Furthermore, PcTx1, with a similar mechanism of action, was tested in animal trials for the treatment of pain, ischemia-associated neuronal death, seizure management and depression, with positive preliminary results.
