= Euphrictus spinosus =

Scientific classification
- Kingdom: Animalia
- Phylum: Arthropoda
- Subphylum: Chelicerata
- Class: Arachnida
- Order: Araneae
- Infraorder: Mygalomorphae
- Family: Theraphosidae
- Genus: Euphrictus
- Species: E. spinosus

Binomial name
- Euphrictus spinosus Hirst, 1908

Species of spider

Euphrictus spinosus is a tarantula (family Theraphosidae), subfamily Selenogyrinae, first described by A.S. Hirst in 1908. It is only known from the male, and from the Dja River, Cameroon.

== Description ==
Only the male is known. Euphrictus spinosus is distinguished by having 7–8 spines on the tibia of the first leg; having a yellowish carapace and a brown abdomen with long bright yellow hairs; and a long tapering embolus with a slight twist in the middle. Its body is 15.5 mm long and it has a stridulating organ between its chelicera. It also lacks a clypeus.
