= Phoneyusa rutilata =

Scientific classification
- Kingdom: Animalia
- Phylum: Arthropoda
- Subphylum: Chelicerata
- Class: Arachnida
- Order: Araneae
- Infraorder: Mygalomorphae
- Family: Theraphosidae
- Genus: Phoneyusa
- Species: P. rutilata

Binomial name
- Phoneyusa rutilata (Simon, 1907)

Species of spider

Phoneyusa rutilata is a member of the tarantula family, Theraphosidae, native to Guinea-Bissau.

== Description ==
Phoneyusa rutilata is a burrowing spider. It is blackish in color with a thick tawny-red covering of hairs.

== Distribution ==
Phoneyusa rutilata is native to Guinea-Bissau. It was originally described from Bolama Island.
