= Satyrex =

Scientific classification
- Kingdom: Animalia
- Phylum: Arthropoda
- Subphylum: Chelicerata
- Class: Arachnida
- Order: Araneae
- Infraorder: Mygalomorphae
- Family: Theraphosidae
- Subfamily: Eumenophorinae
- Genus: Satyrex; Zamani & von Wirth, 2025

Type species
- S. ferox Zamani, von Wirth & Stockmann, 2025

Species
- 5, see text

Genus of spiders

Satyrex is a genus of tarantulas in the family Theraphosidae.

The genus is partially characterised by possessing the longest male palps known in tarantulas, possibly functioning in cannibalism avoidance during mating.

== Distribution ==
Satyrex is distributed across the Arabian Peninsula and the Horn of Africa. The genus occurs in Saudi Arabia, Yemen, Oman, and Somalia.

== Etymology ==
The genus name is a combination of Satyr, a part-man, part beast entity from Greek mythology known for his exceptionally large genitals, and the Latin rēx, meaning king.

== Species ==
As of October 2025, this genus includes five species:

- Satyrex arabicus Zamani & von Wirth, 2025 – Saudi Arabia
- Satyrex ferox Zamani, von Wirth & Stockmann, 2025 – Yemen, Oman (type species)
- Satyrex longimanus (Pocock, 1903) – Yemen
- Satyrex somalicus Zamani & von Wirth, 2025 – Somalia
- Satyrex speciosus Zamani, von Wirth & Just, 2025 – Somalia
