= Anoploscelus =

Scientific classification
- Kingdom: Animalia
- Phylum: Arthropoda
- Subphylum: Chelicerata
- Class: Arachnida
- Order: Araneae
- Infraorder: Mygalomorphae
- Family: Theraphosidae
- Genus: Anoploscelus; Pocock, 1897

Type species
- A. celeripes Pocock, 1897

Species
- A. celeripes Pocock, 1897 – Uganda, Tanzania; A. lesserti Laurent, 1946 – Rwanda

Genus of spiders

Anoploscelus is a genus of East African tarantulas that was first described by Reginald Innes Pocock in 1897. It was erected for the species Anoploscelus celeripes, based on a single male collected near Lake Tanganyika in modern day Tanzania. It was synonymized with Phoneyusa from 1985 to 1990. As of December 2019 it contains two species, including A. lesserti, first found in Rwanda in 1946.
