= Mascaraneus =

Scientific classification
- Kingdom: Animalia
- Phylum: Arthropoda
- Subphylum: Chelicerata
- Class: Arachnida
- Order: Araneae
- Infraorder: Mygalomorphae
- Family: Theraphosidae
- Genus: Mascaraneus; Gallon, 2005
- Species: M. remotus

Binomial name
- Mascaraneus remotus Gallon, 2005

Genus of spiders

Mascaraneus is a monotypic genus of African tarantulas containing the single species Mascaraneus remotus. It was first described by R. C. Gallon in 2005, and is endemic to Mauritius.

== Taxonomy ==
The genus and species were first described by Richard Gallon in 2005. The genus name "Mascaraneus" means "spider of the Mascarene Islands"; mixing the word "Mascarene" with the Latin word for "spider", araneus. The specific name remotus is derived from the Latin word for "remote", referring to the isolated type locality (Serpent Island).

The holotype of Mascaraneus remotus is desiccated, missing the third right leg. It lacks any stridulatory setae, and was therefore considered as ischnocoline but was not placed there, on account of the lack of any medial and proximal hairs on the tibial leg sections, and the presence of integral tarsal scopulae.

== Lack of a stridulatory organ ==
An interesting feature of Mascaraneus remotus is the lack of any stridulatory organ on the upper prolateral surfaces of the first two coxae of the legs. Such an organ, consisting of many robust setae and long plumose setae, is found on nearly every eumenophorine theraphosid (with the exception being Monocentropus, which only has plumose setae).

As a near constant rule, large terrestrial theraphosids have a stridulatory organs of some shape or form. It has been suggested by some (for example, James Wood-Mason, in 1877) that this is used to deter predators. The tiny islet of Serpent Island has only one type of mammal, bats, and the birds of the islet are all diurnal (active by day); therefore, they rarely come into contact with the tarantula. This may have led to the lack of the stridulatory organ.

== Origins ==
Mascaraneus remotus is thought to have come from Madagascar, as during the Pleistocene age the Mascarene Plateau was exposed, with sea level rise, island hopping and local extinction causing its current distribution on the islet of Serpent Island. Another theory is that it came from Eastern Africa, but this is unlikely, as then one would expect eumenophorine tarantulas distributed on the Seychelles, from which only ischnocoline theraphosids are known. Furthermore, several species of Eumenophorinae are found on Madagascar, providing more evidence for the former theory.

== Behaviour ==
It lives in rock crevices and is active at night, where it feeds upon other invertebrates, lizards and seabird chicks. Very little is known about the behaviour, biology and ecology of this species of tarantula.
