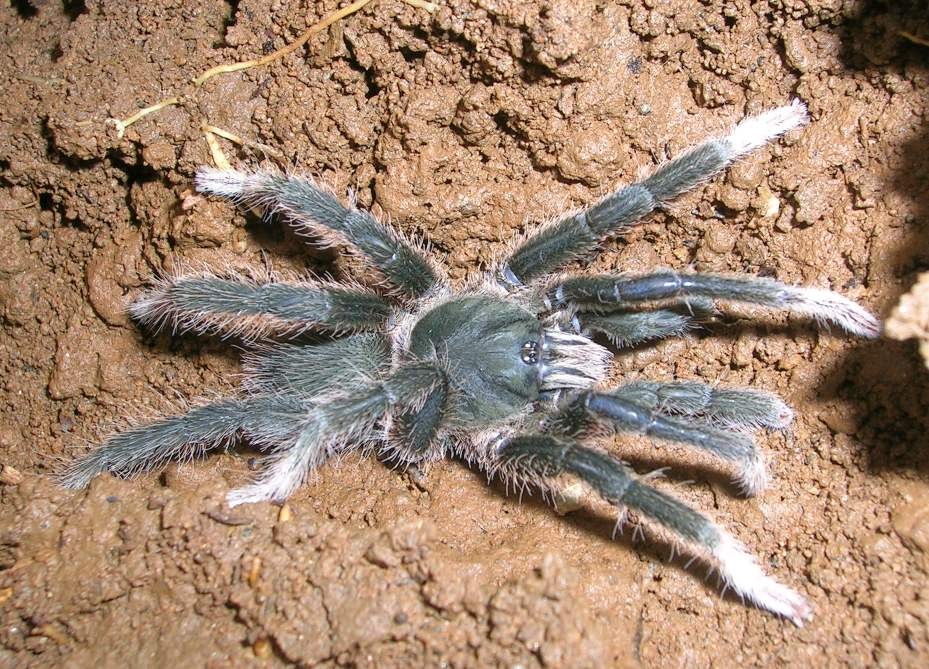

Scientific classification
- Kingdom: Animalia
- Phylum: Arthropoda
- Subphylum: Chelicerata
- Class: Arachnida
- Order: Araneae
- Infraorder: Mygalomorphae
- Family: Theraphosidae
- Genus: Annandaliella
- Species: A. travancorica

Binomial name
- Annandaliella travancorica Hirst, 1909

= Annandaliella travancorica =

Species of spider

Annandaliella travancorica is a species of tarantula spider found in the Western Ghats of India. It was the first of three members of the genus Annandaliella to be described, therefore the type species.

== Characteristics ==
Annandaliella travancorica lacks a tibial comb or any setae on the distal end of the tibia of the first leg. The male lacks any stridulating hairs on the inside of the chelicerae. The female, however, has a stridulatory organ. The male's coxae, femur, metatarsi, tarsi and carapace have a matt of white hairs. The legs are reddish-brown and the cephalothorax has different shades of brown and the abdomen has yellow-brown hairs and long red-brown and golden-brown hairs. It is about 20mm long.
