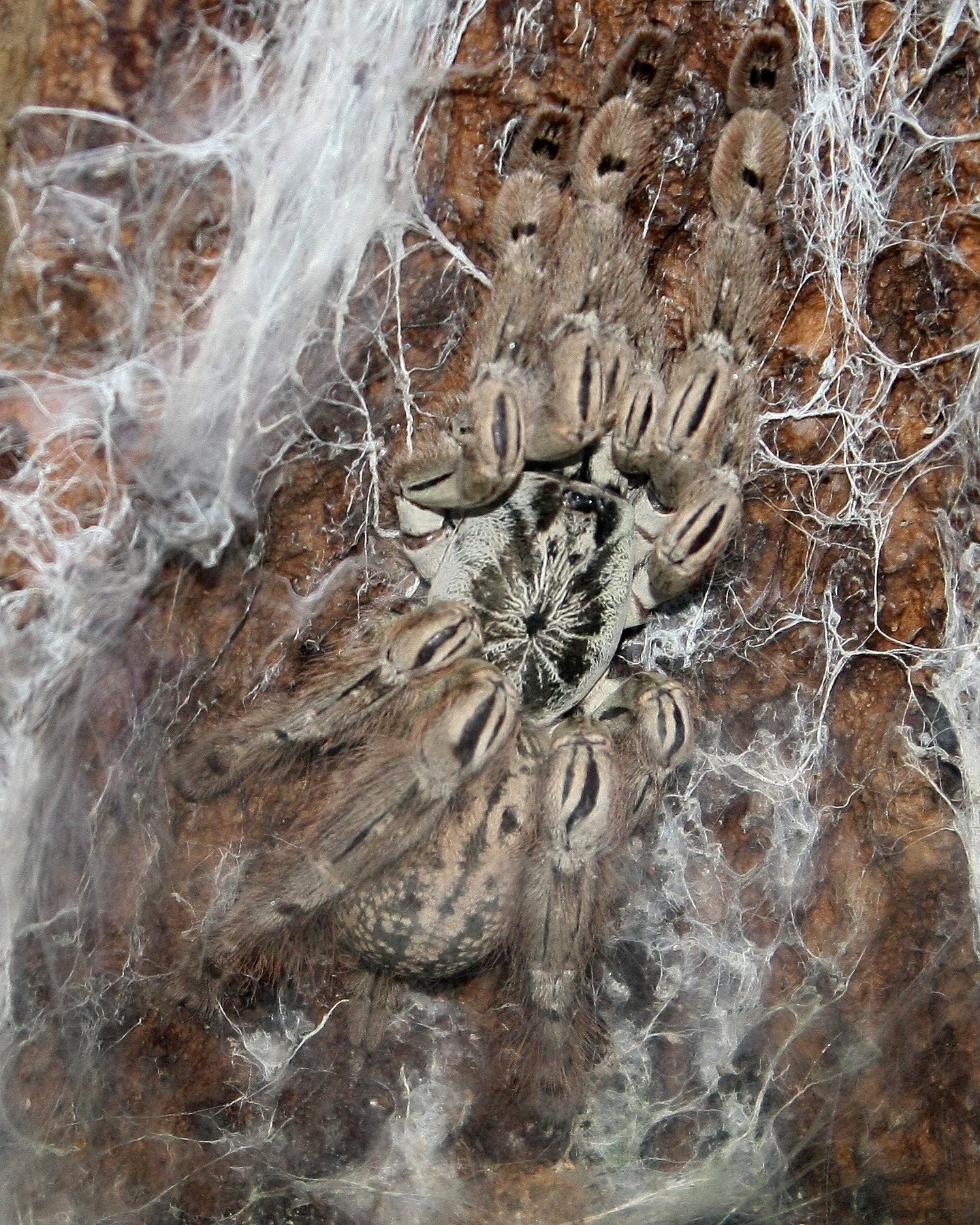

Scientific classification
- Kingdom: Animalia
- Phylum: Arthropoda
- Subphylum: Chelicerata
- Class: Arachnida
- Order: Araneae
- Infraorder: Mygalomorphae
- Family: Theraphosidae
- Genus: Heteroscodra
- Species: H. maculata

Binomial name
- Heteroscodra maculata Pocock, 1899

= Heteroscodra maculata =

Species of tarantula

Heteroscodra maculata is an Old World species of tarantula which was first described in 1899 by Reginald Innes Pocock. This species is native to West Africa and is found primarily in Togo and Ghana. This species has many common names, of which Togo starburst and ornamental baboon are most frequently encountered.

== Description ==
Heterscondra maculata are members of the subfamily Stromatopelminae. These tarantulas originated from West Africa. Being an "Old World species", these tarantulas have highly potent venom and are not recommended for handling.

== Anatomy ==
The species exhibits sexual dimorphism and matures in approximately three years. Mature females are stocky, with a body length of 5 to 6 centimeters (2.0 to 2.4 in) and a leg span up to 13 centimeters (5.1 in). Females live 12-15 years. Males are smaller with shorter lifespans, only living 3-5 years. Juveniles are olive-green or grey. Adults develop a chalky-white or cream base color, marked with mottled black and brown patterns on the abdomen and a starburst pattern on the carapace. The rear legs are noticeably thickened, which aids in gripping tree bark. It lacks urticating hairs.

== Behavior ==
Heteroscodra maculata specimens are quite fast, defensive and possess medically significant venom. Due to their lack of urticating hairs, they tend to bite as a primary defense. They are an arboreal species, though younger specimens have been noted to burrow during their first few months of life. In the wild, these spiders reside in tree hollows, logs, and dense foliage, constructing retreats lined with thick silk sheets. Females tend to reproduce readily, though sexual cannibalism may occur. Egg sacs are reported to contain between 75 and 130 spiderlings.

== Venom ==
The venom of Heteroscodra maculata is medically significant, known to cause intense pain and muscle spasms in humans. The venom includes toxins like δ-theraphotoxin-Hm1a and δ-theraphotoxin-Hm1b. Along with these toxins, it also includes Π-Theraphotoxin-Hm3a. Unlike venoms that destroy tissue or cause widespread inflammation, these toxins activate the Na_{V}1.1 voltage-gated sodium channels located in mechanical pain receptors (A-delta fibers). Because these toxins trigger intense hypersensitivity without causing thermal sensitivity or neurogenic swelling, they have become a useful tool in neurological research for studying how the human body processes chronic pain.

== Domestic breeding ==
Heteroscodra maculata is considered an exotic pet. Due to the species' behavior, its husbandry is generally restricted to experienced handlers. Captive spiders require arboreal enclosures with high vertical clearance and elements such as cork bark or hollow branches to encourage the construction of silk retreats. Cross-ventilation is necessary to replicate the humidity of its native tropical environment. The species reproduces readily in captivity, though introduction of breeding pairs carries a high risk of sexual cannibalism, wherein the female attacks or consumes the male. Following copulation, the female constructs a fixed silk hammock attached to the substrate or enclosure walls to deposit her eggs, rather than forming a mobile egg sac.
