= Batesiella =

Scientific classification
- Kingdom: Animalia
- Phylum: Arthropoda
- Subphylum: Chelicerata
- Class: Arachnida
- Order: Araneae
- Infraorder: Mygalomorphae
- Family: Theraphosidae
- Genus: Batesiella; Pocock, 1903
- Species: B. crinita

Binomial name
- Batesiella crinita Pocock, 1903

Genus of spiders

Batesiella is a monotypic genus of African tarantulas containing the single species, Batesiella crinita. It was first described by Reginald Innes Pocock in 1903, and is found in Cameroon. It is named in honor of the collector, G. L. Bates. It was synonymized with Encyocrates from 1985 to 1990.
