= Selenogyrus austini =

Scientific classification
- Kingdom: Animalia
- Phylum: Arthropoda
- Subphylum: Chelicerata
- Class: Arachnida
- Order: Araneae
- Infraorder: Mygalomorphae
- Family: Theraphosidae
- Genus: Selenogyrus
- Species: S. austini

Binomial name
- Selenogyrus austini Smith, 1990

Species of spider

Selenogyrus austini is a theraphosid spider. As of February 2016, it is a member of the selenogyrinae. It is native to Sierra Leone.

== Etymology ==
The specific name "austini" is in honour of the collector of the type specimens, Mr. E. E. Austin.

== Characteristics ==
S. austini has a characteristic crescent-shaped layout of the granules on the labium, and also has unique layout of the labio-sternal "mounds": the anterior pair being larger than in other species. It also has relatively stout stridulatory clavate ("club-shaped") setae on the chelicerae. The spermathecae are quite narrow at their base, and the clypeus is small but not absent. It is 41 mm in length. It is uniformly brown.
