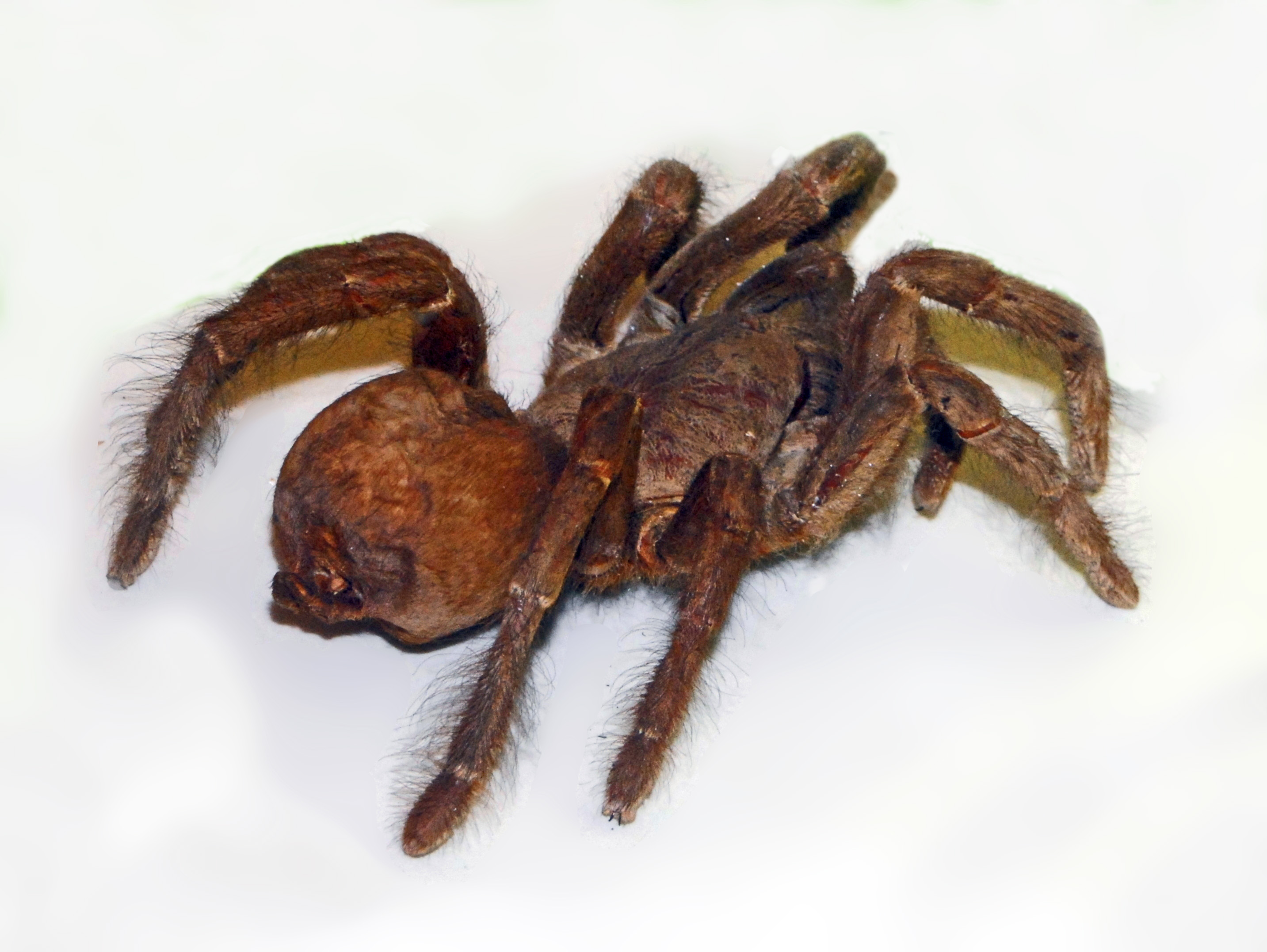
- From Gabon at the Museo Civico di Storia Naturale di Milano

Scientific classification
- Kingdom: Animalia
- Phylum: Arthropoda
- Subphylum: Chelicerata
- Class: Arachnida
- Order: Araneae
- Infraorder: Mygalomorphae
- Family: Theraphosidae
- Genus: Phoneyusa
- Species: P. lesserti

Binomial name
- Phoneyusa lesserti Dresco, 1973

= Phoneyusa lesserti =

Species of spider

Phoneyusa lesserti is a species of spiders belonging to the family Theraphosidae (tarantulas).

== Distribution ==
This species can be found in the Central African Republic.
