= Eumenophorus =

Scientific classification
- Kingdom: Animalia
- Phylum: Arthropoda
- Subphylum: Chelicerata
- Class: Arachnida
- Order: Araneae
- Infraorder: Mygalomorphae
- Family: Theraphosidae
- Genus: Eumenophorus; Pocock, 1897

Type species
- E. clementsi Pocock, 1897

Species
- E. clementsi Pocock, 1897 – Sierra Leone; E. murphyorum Smith, 1990 – Sierra Leone}

Synonyms
- Monocentropella Strand, 1907

Genus of spiders

Eumenophorus is a genus of Sierra Leonean tarantulas that was first described by Reginald Innes Pocock in 1897. As of March 2020 it contains two species, found in Sierra Leone: E. clementsi and E. murphyorum. It is considered a senior synonym of Monocentropella.
