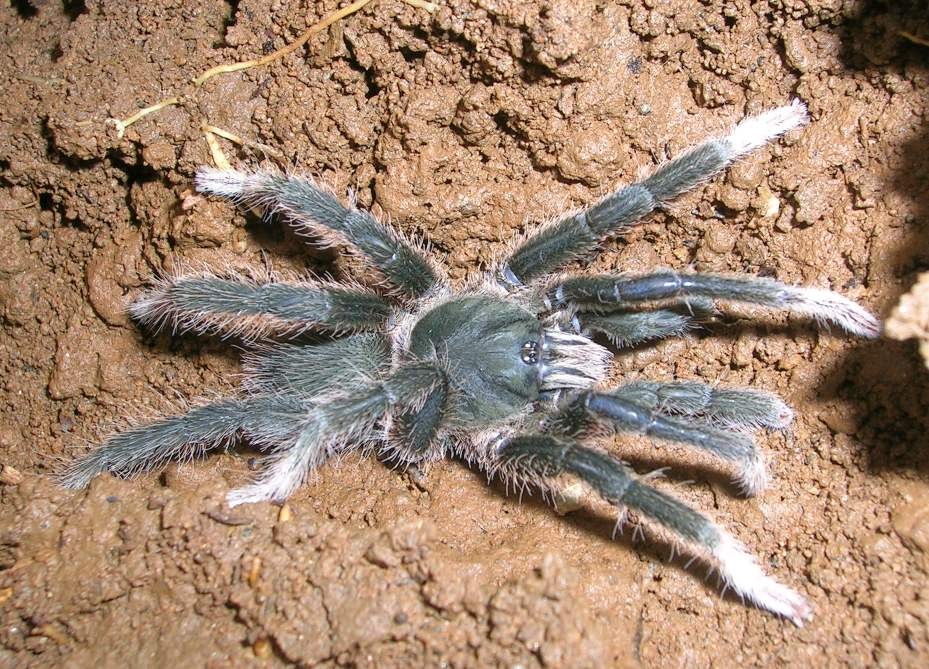
- Annandaliella travancorica

Scientific classification
- Kingdom: Animalia
- Phylum: Arthropoda
- Subphylum: Chelicerata
- Class: Arachnida
- Order: Araneae
- Infraorder: Mygalomorphae
- Family: Theraphosidae
- Subfamily: Selenogyrinae
- Genus: Annandaliella; Hirst, 1909

Type species
- A. travancorica Hirst, 1909

Species
- A. ernakulamensis Sunil Jose & Sebastian, 2008 – India; A. pectinifera Gravely, 1935 – India; A. travancorica Hirst, 1909 – India

= Annandaliella =

Genus of spiders

Annandaliella is a genus of tarantulas that was first described by Arthur Stanley Hirst in 1909. As of December 2019 it contains three species endemic to India: A. ernakulamensis, A. pectinifera, and A. travancorica. They are selenogyrid tarantulas, meaning they have a stridulating organ on the inner side of the chelicerae.

== Diagnosis ==
They can be distinguished from other genera by the row of spines found in the inner side of the celicerae found in males, used for stridulation. Their feet of leg 1 is slender, and the division of their tarsal scopula is practically obsolete in males.
