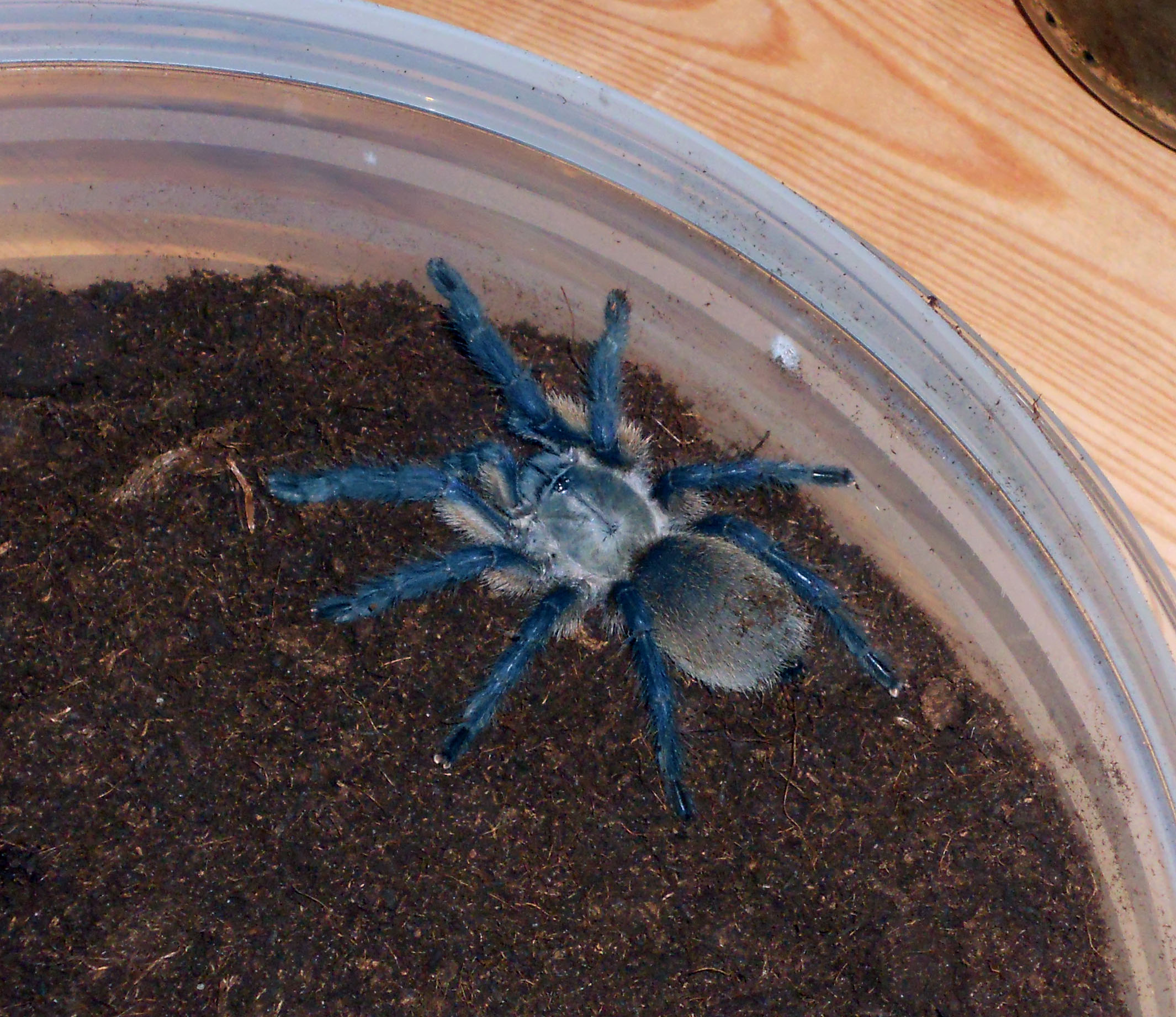

Scientific classification
- Kingdom: Animalia
- Phylum: Arthropoda
- Subphylum: Chelicerata
- Class: Arachnida
- Order: Araneae
- Infraorder: Mygalomorphae
- Family: Theraphosidae
- Genus: Monocentropus
- Species: M. balfouri

Binomial name
- Monocentropus balfouri Pocock, 1897

= Monocentropus balfouri =

Species of tarantula

Monocentropus balfouri is a tarantula in the Monocentropus genus. It was first described by Reginald Innes Pocock in 1897. The species is also called Socotra Island blue baboon tarantula, usually shortened to blue baboon tarantula. The scientific name refers to the collector Isaac Bayley Balfour. The Spider is found on Socotra Island, hence the common name. This tarantula is terrestrial and an opportunistic burrower. Like many tarantulas, M. balfouri can be kept as a pet, although it is not a beginner species.

== Description ==
The adult coloration of M. balfouri is striking, a vivid blue, though some red and amber variants have been seen very rarely. The carapace is blue, as is the leg except for the trochanter, which, like the rest of the body, is cream-colored or grey. The opisthosoma (abdomen) is cream-colored, grey and partially blue. Females of the species live for about 10 to 14 years, while males tend to live for about 3 to 4 years. The species‘ venom potency is not known. Although it is believed by some to be able to kill a dromedary, this is most likely not the case.

== Habitat ==
This spider is found in Socotra, which is part of Yemen. Socotra is known for having a unique flora and fauna. The species is usually found up to 850 meters above sea level. The average temperature in Socotra is 28 °C with an average of 193 millimeters of annual rainfall, and an average humidity of 65%.

== Behavior ==
A unique behavior of this tarantula is that it is communal, to the point that mother spiders care for the young, even attacking potential predators if they get too close to her egg sac. In captivity, multiple males and females of different ages may live together without attacking one another, provided that they have enough food and proper care. When threatened, M. balfouri gives a characteristic “threat pose,” rearing up on the hind legs and baring the chelicerae. Further provocation will lead this tarantula to deliver a fast strike and bite, especially if protecting an egg sac. As it is a species of tarantula found in the Old World, M. balfouri does not possess urticating hairs.
