= Loxomphalia =

Scientific classification
- Kingdom: Animalia
- Phylum: Arthropoda
- Subphylum: Chelicerata
- Class: Arachnida
- Order: Araneae
- Infraorder: Mygalomorphae
- Family: Theraphosidae
- Genus: Loxomphalia; Simon, 1889
- Species: L. rubida

Binomial name
- Loxomphalia rubida Simon, 1889

Genus of spiders

Loxomphalia is a monotypic genus of tarantulas containing the single species, Loxomphalia rubida. It was first described from a female found by Eugène Louis Simon in 1889, and it has only been found on the Zanzibar Archipelago.
