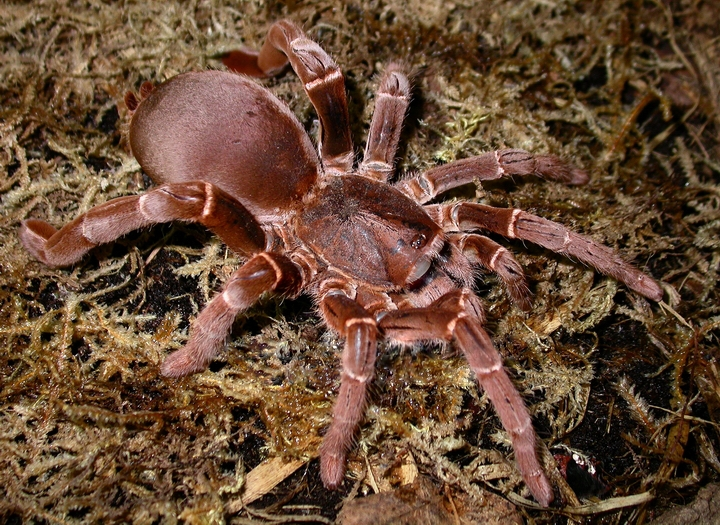

Scientific classification
- Kingdom: Animalia
- Phylum: Arthropoda
- Subphylum: Chelicerata
- Class: Arachnida
- Order: Araneae
- Infraorder: Mygalomorphae
- Family: Theraphosidae
- Genus: Pelinobius; Karsch, 1885
- Species: P. muticus

Binomial name
- Pelinobius muticus Karsch, 1885

Synonyms
- Of genus: Citharischius Pocock, 1900; Of species: Citharischius crawshayi Pocock, 1900; Phoneyusa bettoni Pocock, 1898; Phoneyusa gregorii Pocock, 1897; Phoneyusa rufa Berland, 1914

= King baboon spider =

Genus of spiders

Pelinobius is a monotypic genus of east African tarantulas (family Theraphosidae) containing the single species, Pelinobius muticus, the king baboon spider. It was first described by Ferdinand Anton Franz Karsch in 1885 and is found in Tanzania, Kenya and Zimbabwe.

== Taxonomy ==
The genus Pelinobius and the species Pelinobius muticus were first described by Ferdinand Karsch in 1885. Independently, Reginald Innes Pocock described Citharischius crawshayi in his new genus Citharischius in 1900. In 1985, Robert Raven synonymized Pelinobius with Phoneyusa, as had been suggested by Pocock in 1898. In 2010, R. C. Gallon restored Pelinobius and made Citharischius a junior synonym, and also made Citharischius crawshayi and some species in the genus Phoneyusa synonyms of P. muticus.

== Description ==
The king baboon spider is rusty brown to orange in color. They live in the shrublands and grasslands of east Africa, often using vegetation as a protective cover for their burrows. They are one of the few tarantulas that use stridulation as a major defense mechanism in addition to rearing up and striking. They produce the stridulation-sound-effect by rubbing the femurs of their first and second pairs of legs.

They are a slow-growing species, but can reach a leg span of up to 20 centimeters. They are burrowing spiders with thick back legs used for digging. They generally hunt beetles, cockroaches, and other spiders, and they will put silk near the entrance to their burrow to detect vibrations of passing prey.

== In captivity ==
They are popular among collectors, but they tend to be highly defensive, lacking urticating hairs and are not suitable for beginners. They have very strong venom and their bites are extremely painful, though they are not known to be deadly to humans. A bite from a smaller spider will cause sharp pain and localized itchiness for five days.

Adults can be kept in a converted aquarium if given plenty of ventilation and a substrate at least 25 centimeters deep. Younger spiders can be kept in small containers, such as pill- and waxworm-tubs, but will need deeper containers as they grow.
