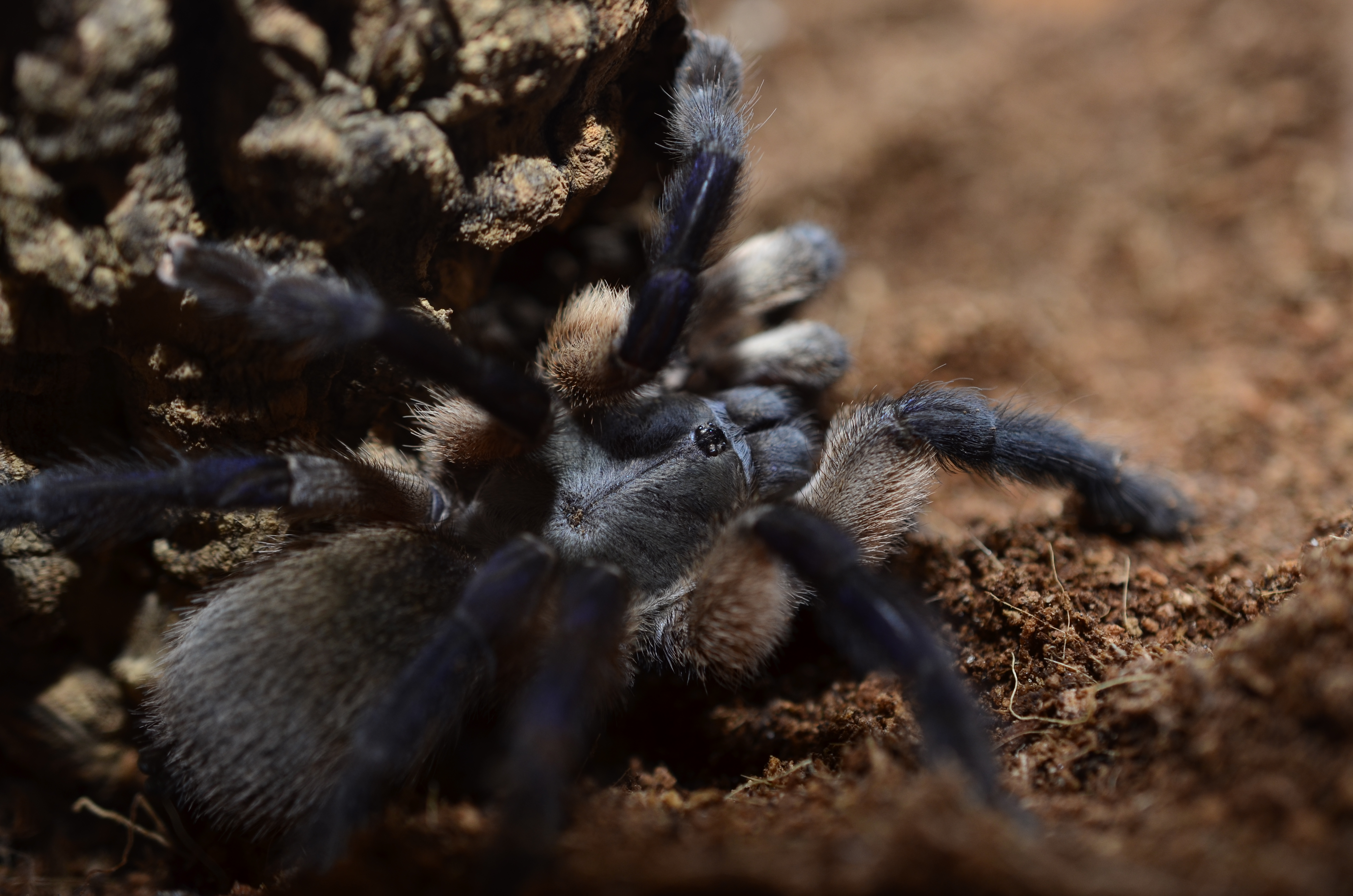
- Monocentropus balfouri

Scientific classification
- Kingdom: Animalia
- Phylum: Arthropoda
- Subphylum: Chelicerata
- Class: Arachnida
- Order: Araneae
- Infraorder: Mygalomorphae
- Family: Theraphosidae
- Genus: Monocentropus; Pocock, 1897

Type species
- M. balfouri Pocock, 1897

Species
- M. balfouri Pocock, 1897 – Yemen (Socotra); M. lambertoni Fage, 1922 – Madagascar

= Monocentropus =

Genus of spiders

Monocentropus is a genus of tarantulas that was first described by Reginald Innes Pocock in 1897. As of December 2025 it officially contains two species, found in Madagascar and in Yemen: M. balfouri and M. lambertoni. Though recently, the position of M. lambertoni has been put into question, being deemed an incerta sedis.

M. balfouri has many unusual characteristics for a tarantula species, most notably their heightened defensiveness towards humans, gregarious nature with others of their own kind, and strong maternal instincts, with mothers even bringing food to their spiderlings. Their striking blue coloration and tendency to live in colonies make them an attractive, rewarding but challenging and obstreperous-natured pet.

== Description ==
Monocentropus strongly resembles the genus Satyrex, with Satyrex longimanus originally being considered a part of Monocentropus. As well as M. lambertoni possibly being part of the same genus. Apart from their behavior, species of this genus can be distinguished by their not elongated male palp.
