= Euphrictus =

Scientific classification
- Kingdom: Animalia
- Phylum: Arthropoda
- Subphylum: Chelicerata
- Class: Arachnida
- Order: Araneae
- Infraorder: Mygalomorphae
- Family: Theraphosidae
- Subfamily: Selenogyrinae
- Genus: Euphrictus; Hirst, 1908

Genus of spiders

Euphrictus is a genus of tarantula (family Theraphosidae) which is found in Africa. It is part of the subfamily Selenogyrinae.

== Taxonomy ==
The genus Euphrictus was erected by A.S. Hirst in 1908 for the species Euphrictus spinosus, described on the basis of a single male from Cameroon.

Euphrictus has a rastellum on the chelicerae, which is rare in tarantulas, as it is quite primitive, and could point to the conclusion that all tarantulas may once have had this feature, but this was lost in more advanced groups. A lack of genera prevents this from being proven.

== Description ==
Euphrictus is characterized by the stridulating organ between the chelicerae. This consists of stout, peg-like setae and thick thornlike spines. There is also rastellum on the chelicerae.

== Species ==
As of January 2016, the World Spider Catalog accepted the following species:

- Euphrictus spinosus (type species) Hirst, 1908 – Cameroon
- Euphrictus squamosus (Benoit, 1965) – Congo
