= Loxoptygus =

Scientific classification
- Kingdom: Animalia
- Phylum: Arthropoda
- Subphylum: Chelicerata
- Class: Arachnida
- Order: Araneae
- Infraorder: Mygalomorphae
- Family: Theraphosidae
- Genus: Loxoptygus; Simon, 1903

Type species
- L. ectypus (Simon, 1889)

Species
- L. coturnatus Simon, 1903 – Ethiopia; L. ectypus (Simon, 1889) – Ethiopia

Synonyms
- Loxoptygella Strand, 1906

Genus of spiders

Loxoptygus is a genus of African tarantulas that was first described by Eugène Louis Simon in 1903. As of March 2020 it contains two species, found in Ethiopia: L. coturnatus and L. ectypus. It was removed from the synonymy of Phoneyusa, and is considered a senior synonym of Loxoptygella.
