= Encyocrates =

Scientific classification
- Kingdom: Animalia
- Phylum: Arthropoda
- Subphylum: Chelicerata
- Class: Arachnida
- Order: Araneae
- Infraorder: Mygalomorphae
- Family: Theraphosidae
- Genus: Encyocrates; Simon, 1892
- Species: E. raffrayi

Binomial name
- Encyocrates raffrayi Simon, 1892

Genus of spiders

Encyocrates is a monotypic genus of African tarantulas found on Madagascar containing the single species, Encyocrates raffrayi. The female was first described by Eugène Louis Simon in 1892, and the male was described by Lucien Berland in 1917.
