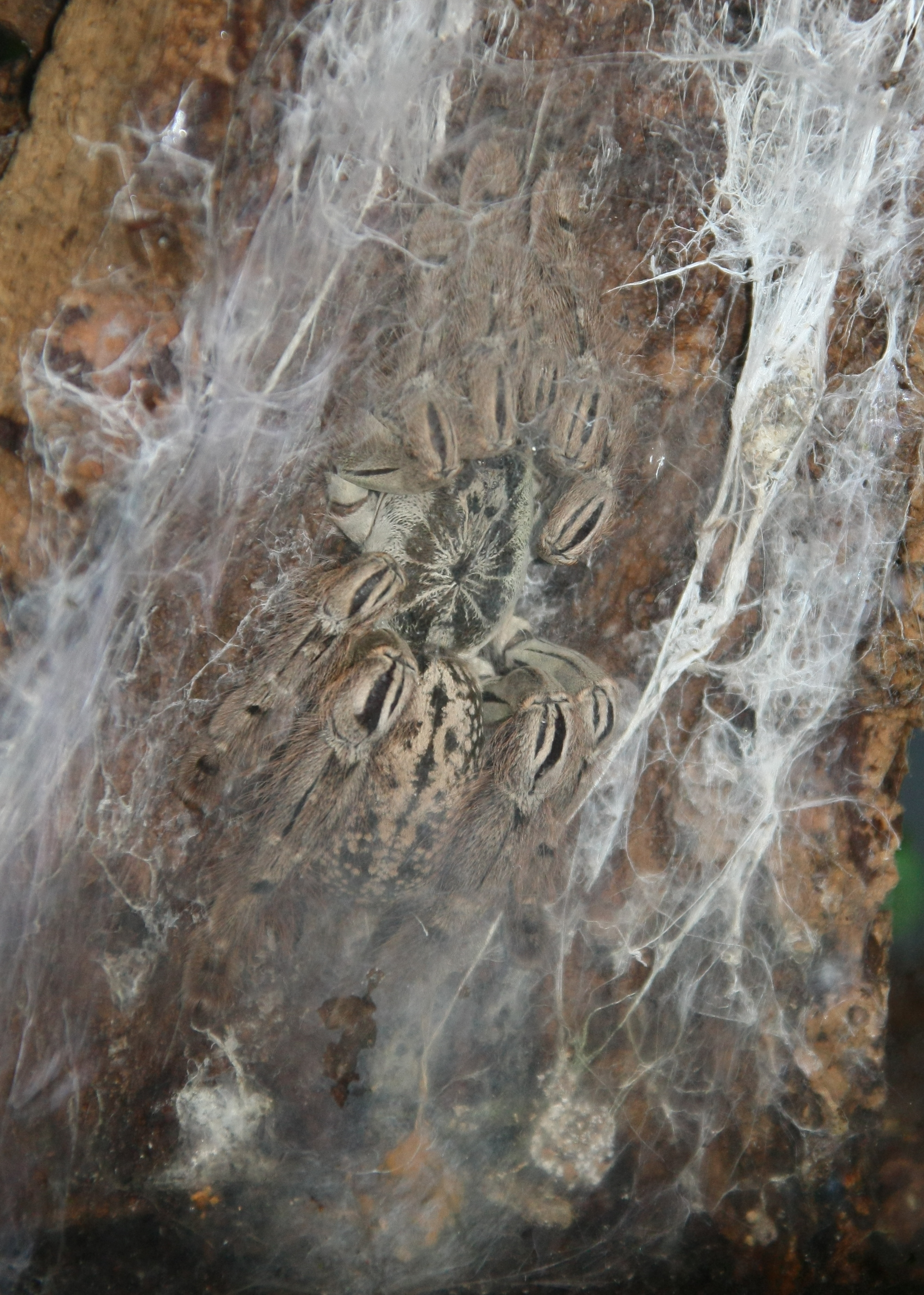
- Heteroscodra maculata

Scientific classification
- Kingdom: Animalia
- Phylum: Arthropoda
- Subphylum: Chelicerata
- Class: Arachnida
- Order: Araneae
- Infraorder: Mygalomorphae
- Family: Theraphosidae
- Genus: Heteroscodra; Pocock, 1900

Type species
- H. maculata Pocock, 1900

Species
- H. crassipes Hirst, 1907 – Cameroon, Gabon, Congo; H. maculata Pocock, 1900 – West, Central Africa

= Heteroscodra =

Genus of spiders

Heteroscodra is a genus of Central African tarantulas that was first described by Reginald Innes Pocock in 1900. Like many Old World tarantulas, they have a strong venom, and can inflict a painful bite. As of March 2020 it contains two species, found in Africa: H. crassipes and H. maculata.
