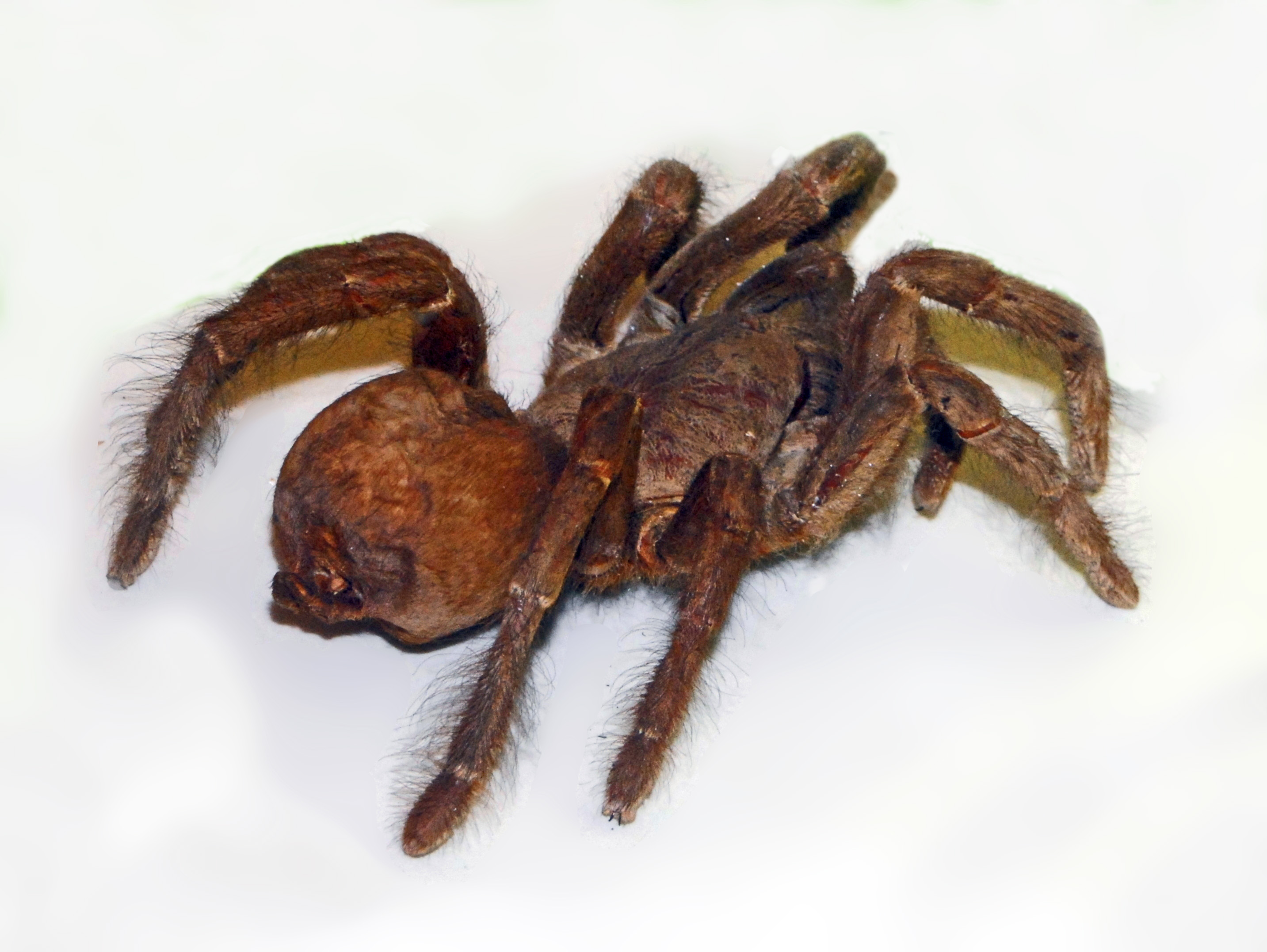
- Phoneyusa lesserti from Gabon at the Museo Civico di Storia Naturale di Milano

Scientific classification
- Kingdom: Animalia
- Phylum: Arthropoda
- Subphylum: Chelicerata
- Class: Arachnida
- Order: Araneae
- Infraorder: Mygalomorphae
- Family: Theraphosidae
- Genus: Phoneyusa; Karsch, 1884

= Phoneyusa =

Genus of spiders

Phoneyusa is a genus of spiders belonging to the family Theraphosidae (tarantulas).

== Taxonomy ==
The genus was erected by Ferdinand Karsch in 1884, based on a spider from central Africa he regarded as in some ways similar to the South American genera Avicularia and Eurypelma (now included in Avicularia), but nevertheless distinct. Karsch explained the name as meaning "murderess". (Phoneyusa is one transcription of the Greek φονεύουσα, derived from the verb φονεύω, 'murder'.)

== Distribution ==
The species of this genus are found in sub-Saharan Africa.

== Species ==
As of May 2016, the World Spider Catalog accepted the following species:

- Phoneyusa antilope (Simon, 1889) – Congo
- Phoneyusa belandana Karsch, 1884 (type species) – Central African Rep.
- Phoneyusa bidentata Pocock, 1899 – West, Central Africa
- Phoneyusa bouvieri Berland, 1917 – Madagascar
- Phoneyusa buettneri Karsch, 1886 – Gabon
- Phoneyusa chevalieri Simon, 1906 – West Africa
- Phoneyusa cultridens Berland, 1917 – Congo
- Phoneyusa gabonica (Simon, 1889) – Gabon
- Phoneyusa giltayi Laurent, 1946 – Congo
- Phoneyusa gracilipes (Simon, 1889) – Congo
- Phoneyusa lesserti Dresco, 1973 – Central African Rep.
- Phoneyusa manicata Simon, 1907 – Príncipe
- Phoneyusa minima (Strand, 1907) – Cameroon
- Phoneyusa principium Simon, 1907 – Príncipe
- Phoneyusa rutilata (Simon, 1907) – Guinea-Bissau
- Phoneyusa westi Smith, 1990 – Angola
