= Selenogyrinae =

Scientific classification
- Kingdom: Animalia
- Phylum: Arthropoda
- Subphylum: Chelicerata
- Class: Arachnida
- Order: Araneae
- Infraorder: Mygalomorphae
- Family: Theraphosidae
- Subfamily: Selenogyrinae; Hirst, 1908

Genera
- See text

Subfamily of tarantulas

The Selenogyrinae are a subfamily of tarantulas found in Africa and Asia.

== Characteristics ==
The Selenogyrinae are characterized by a unique stridulating organ situated between the chelicerae, which consists of two very similar rows of hair. In Annandaliella, this is reduced. Some species have labiosternal mounds and the clypeus is usually absent, or very narrow.

== Genera ==
The WSC currently accepts these genera:

- Annandaliella, Hirst 1909
- Euphrictus, Hirst 1908
- Selenogyrus, Pocock 1897

Selenogyrus and Euphrictus were the original genera in Arthur Stanley Hirst's 1908 Selenogyrinae. Annandaliella genus, also described by Hirst in 1909, was added to the subfamily by Gunter Schmidt in 1993.
