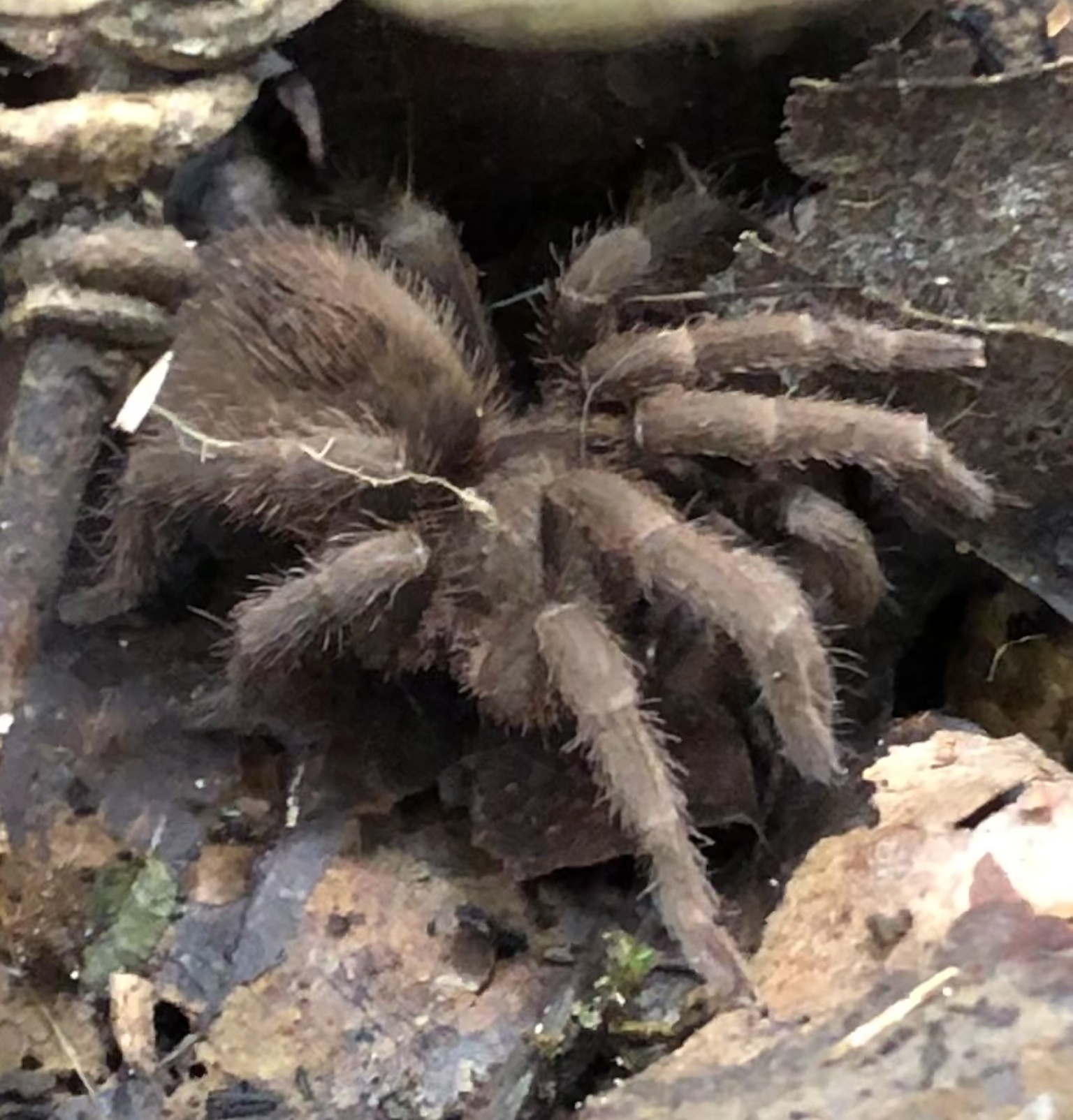
- female Urupelma sp. from Madre de Dios, Peru
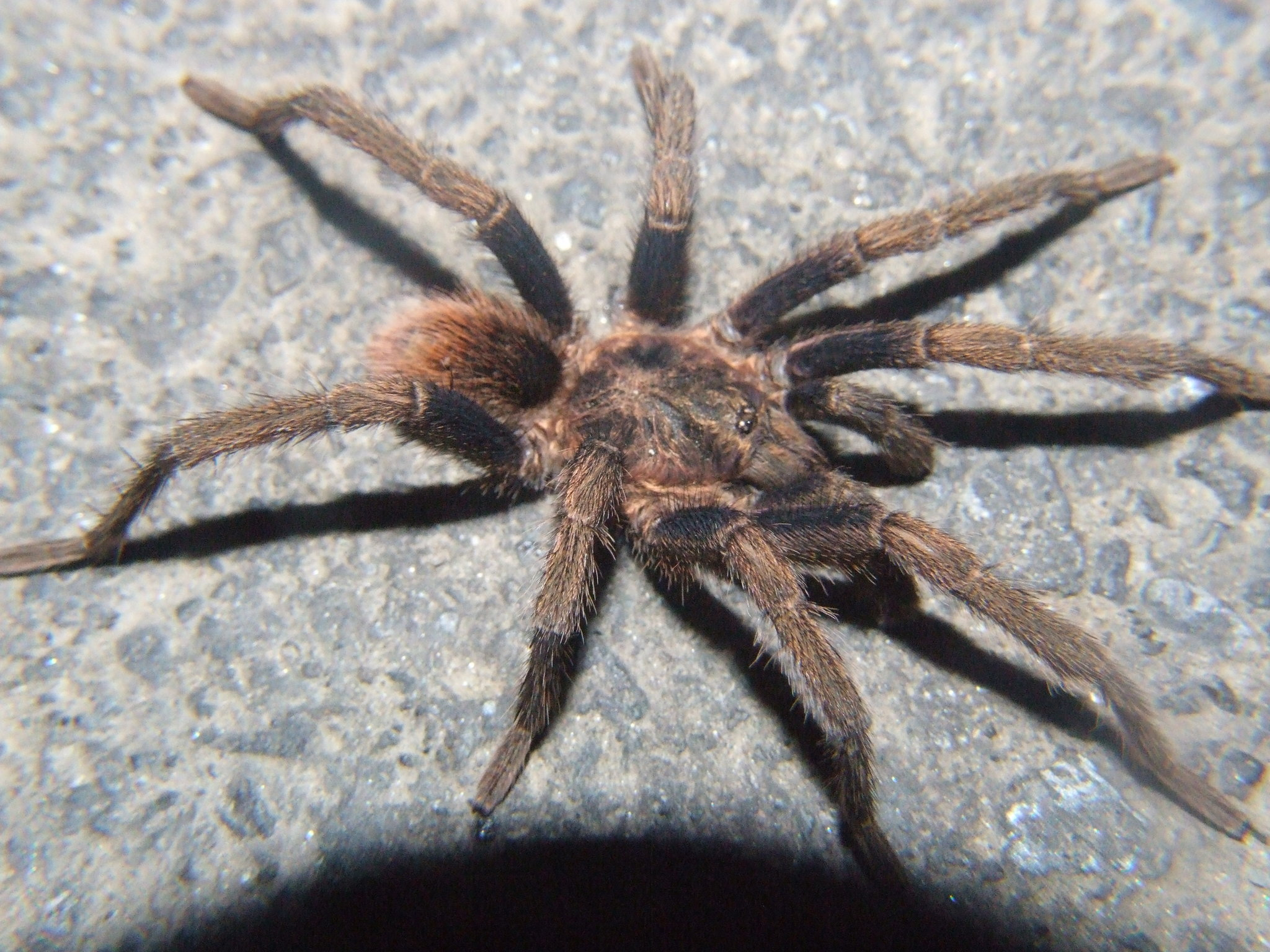
- male Urupelma sp. from Cusco, Peru

Scientific classification
- Kingdom: Animalia
- Phylum: Arthropoda
- Subphylum: Chelicerata
- Class: Arachnida
- Order: Araneae
- Infraorder: Mygalomorphae
- Family: Theraphosidae
- Genus: Urupelma; Kaderka, Lüddecke, Řezáč, Řezáčová & Hüsser, 2023

Type species
- Hemirrhagus peruvianus Chamberlin, 1916

Species
- 12, see text

= Urupelma =

Genus of spiders

Urupelma is a genus of spiders in the family Theraphosidae.

== Distribution ==
Urupelma is endemic to Peru, with all known species restricted to this South American country.

== Taxonomy ==
U. peruvianum was added to the newly created genus Isiboroa by Gabriel et al. in 2023, shortly before it was made the type species of this genus.

== Species ==
As of October 2025, this genus includes twelve species:

- Urupelma ashaninka Kaderka, Lüddecke, Řezáč, Řezáčová & Hüsser, 2023
- Urupelma atarraz Kaderka, Lüddecke, Řezáč, Řezáčová & Hüsser, 2023
- Urupelma dianae Kaderka, Lüddecke, Řezáč, Řezáčová & Hüsser, 2023
- Urupelma humantay Kaderka, 2024
- Urupelma johannae Kaderka, Lüddecke, Řezáč, Řezáčová & Hüsser, 2023
- Urupelma machiguenga Kaderka, Lüddecke, Řezáč, Řezáčová & Hüsser, 2023
- Urupelma megantonianum Kaderka, Lüddecke, Řezáč, Řezáčová & Hüsser, 2023
- Urupelma pampas Kaderka, Lüddecke, Řezáč, Řezáčová & Hüsser, 2023
- Urupelma peruvianum (Chamberlin, 1916) (type species)
- Urupelma sanctimariae Kaderka, Lüddecke, Řezáč, Řezáčová & Hüsser, 2023
- Urupelma sanctitheresae Kaderka, Lüddecke, Řezáč, Řezáčová & Hüsser, 2023
- Urupelma veronicae Kaderka, Lüddecke, Řezáč, Řezáčová & Hüsser, 2023
