= Isiboroa =

Scientific classification
- Kingdom: Animalia
- Phylum: Arthropoda
- Subphylum: Chelicerata
- Class: Arachnida
- Order: Araneae
- Infraorder: Mygalomorphae
- Family: Theraphosidae
- Genus: Isiboroa; Gabriel, Sherwood & Pérez-Miles, 2023

Type species
- I. hamelae Gabriel, Sherwood, Pérez-Miles, 2023

Species
- 2, see text

Genus of spiders

Isiboroa is a genus of South American tarantulas in the family Theraphosidae.

== Distribution ==
Isiboroa is found in South America, with one species endemic to Bolivia, the other to Peru.

== Taxonomy ==
I. sacsayhuaman was originally described as a member of genus Acanthoscurria.

Homoeomma peruvianum was moved to this genus by Gabriel et al. (2023), but then also made the type species of the newly created genus Urupelma by Kaderka et al. in the same year.

== Species ==
As of October 2025, this genus includes two species:

- Isiboroa hamelae Gabriel, Sherwood & Pérez-Miles, 2023 – Bolivia (type species)
- Isiboroa sacsayhuaman (Ferretti, Ochoa & Chaparro, 2016) – Peru
