= Aguapanela arvi =

Scientific classification
- Kingdom: Animalia
- Phylum: Arthropoda
- Subphylum: Chelicerata
- Class: Arachnida
- Order: Araneae
- Infraorder: Mygalomorphae
- Family: Theraphosidae
- Genus: Aguapanela
- Species: A. arvi

Binomial name
- Aguapanela arvi Perafán & Cifuentes, 2015

Genus of spiders

Aguapanela arvi is a species of South American tarantulas. It is the sole species in the genus Aguapanela. It was first described by C. Perafán, Y. Cifuentes & S. Estrada-Gomez in 2015, and has only been found in Colombia.
