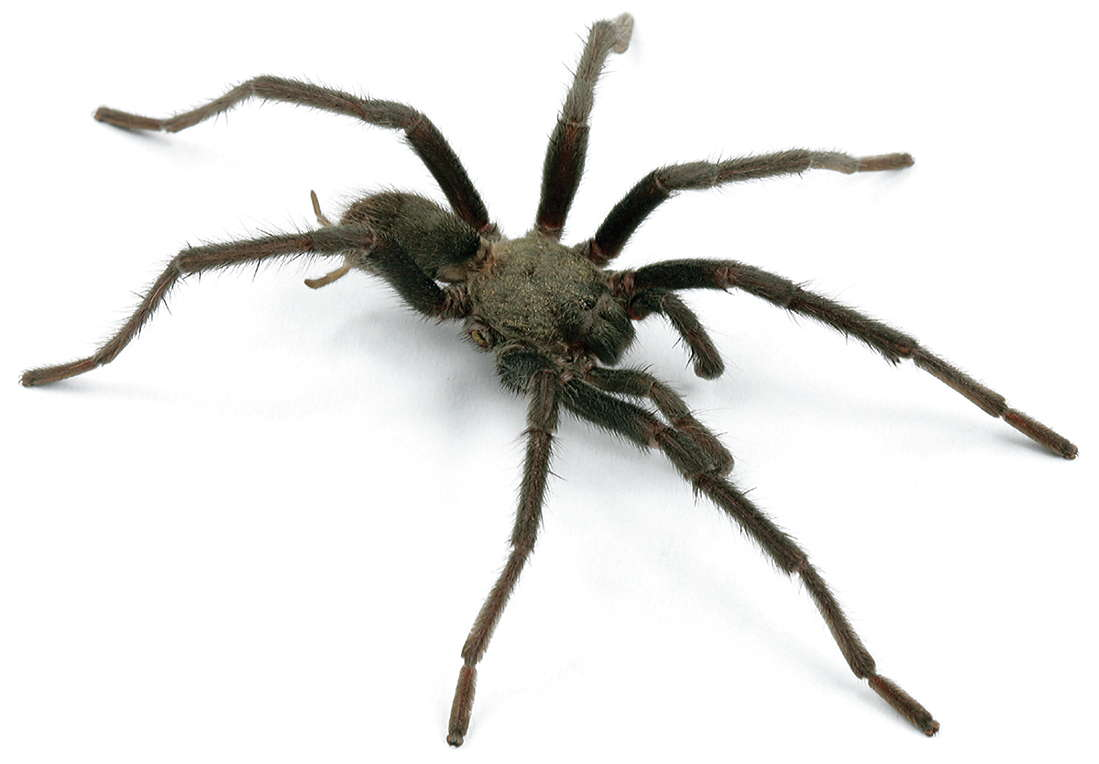
- Male

Scientific classification
- Domain: Eukaryota
- Kingdom: Animalia
- Phylum: Arthropoda
- Subphylum: Chelicerata
- Class: Arachnida
- Order: Araneae
- Infraorder: Mygalomorphae
- Family: Theraphosidae
- Genus: Aphonopelma
- Species: A. xwalxwal

Binomial name
- Aphonopelma xwalxwal Hamilton, 2016

= Aphonopelma xwalxwal =

Species of spider

Aphonopelma xwalxwal is a species of spiders in the family Theraphosidae, found in United States (California).

== Etymology and pronunciation ==
A. xwalxwal is pronounced like "hwal-hwal", with "hw" like the rasping noise of blowing out a candle, "a" as in "father", and "l" like "light". It comes from the Cahuilla language and means "a small spider". The Cahuilla tribe originally owned the land where this species is currently (as of February 2016) only known from, the Coachella Valley and Borrego Springs.

== Distribution ==
Aphonopelma xwalxwal is only known from the Palm Springs and Borrego Springs (as of February 2016). It is probably restricted to the Sonoran Mountains and Sonoran Mountain Woodland and Shrubland.

== Diagnostic Features ==
A. xwalxwal is most similar to A. joshua, only larger and a different breeding period (autumn instead of summer). It is one of the largest dwarf Aphonopelma species. The fourth femur is from 1 cm to 1.05 cm long. It is only known from the male.
