= Aphonopelma mooreae =

Scientific classification
- Domain: Eukaryota
- Kingdom: Animalia
- Phylum: Arthropoda
- Subphylum: Chelicerata
- Class: Arachnida
- Order: Araneae
- Infraorder: Mygalomorphae
- Family: Theraphosidae
- Genus: Aphonopelma
- Species: A. mooreae

Binomial name
- Aphonopelma mooreae Smith, 1995

Species of tarantula

Aphonopelma mooreae, commonly known as the Mexican Jade Fuego Tarantula or the North American Cobalt Tarantula is a species of tarantula first described by arachnologist Andrew Smith in 1995.

== Etymology ==
A. mooreae was named after Dr. Wendy Moore an accomplished entomologist and former president of the American Arachnological Society. As its common name suggests, it is found in Mexico. The Spanish word "fuego" refers to the fiery red-orange hairs on its opisthosoma and legs.

== Description ==
This tarantula's coloration is unusual for Aphonopelma species; its legs are a gradient of metallic blue fading to black in some areas, and covered in long slender hairs which vary in color from fawn to red and orange. The carapace and chelicerae are a metallic blueish-green color. The opisthosoma is black and covered with long reddish hairs. It resembles the Chromatopelma cyaneopubescens in coloration, A. mooreae is considerably hairier than C. cyaneopubescens—the hairs on the legs of A. mooreae are denser and curled, and overall the hairs are significantly longer.

Somewhat similar in longevity to other Aphonopelma species, females can live up to 25 years in the wild, and males typically live 5 to 7 years. Its adult size is roughly 10cm to 13cm (4 to 5 inches).

== Behavior ==
Like other Aphonopelma species, this is a terrestrial tarantula. According to research, A. mooreae will sometimes dig burrows ranging from simple "scrape" burrows to more intricate tunnel-like burrows.

== Habitat ==
Found in Mexico, A. mooreae is endemic to Yécora in the state of Sonora. The region has a subtropical highland climate and is located in the Sierra Madre Occidental. Average annual temperatures are 14 °C (61 °F), with an average yearly rainfall of 1023mm (40in). Yécora is mainly deciduous forest in combination with coniferous and pine forests, with native plants such as Pochote and Cyrtocarpa procera. The region's biodiversity is high, and it is home to a wide range of flora and fauna. Notable predators include the ocelot, lynx, and the California Spiny Tailed Iguana—all of which occasionally prey on tarantulas. Other predators include birds and various mammals. Although additional sources state that A. mooreae is endemic to Jalisco—roughly 1000km (622mi) south from Yécora—the bulk of research and sightings of this species have been in Yécora.
