= Aphonopelma braunshausenii =

Scientific classification
- Domain: Eukaryota
- Kingdom: Animalia
- Phylum: Arthropoda
- Subphylum: Chelicerata
- Class: Arachnida
- Order: Araneae
- Infraorder: Mygalomorphae
- Family: Theraphosidae
- Genus: Aphonopelma
- Species: A. braunshausenii

Binomial name
- Aphonopelma braunshausenii Tesmoingt, 1996

Species of spider

Aphonopelma braunshausenii is a species of spiders in the family Theraphosidae, found in Mexico.
