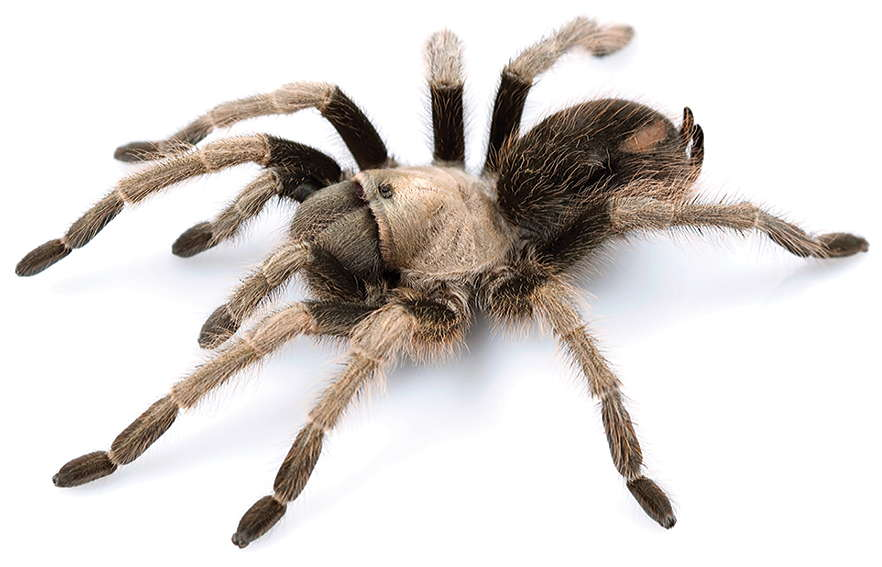
- Female
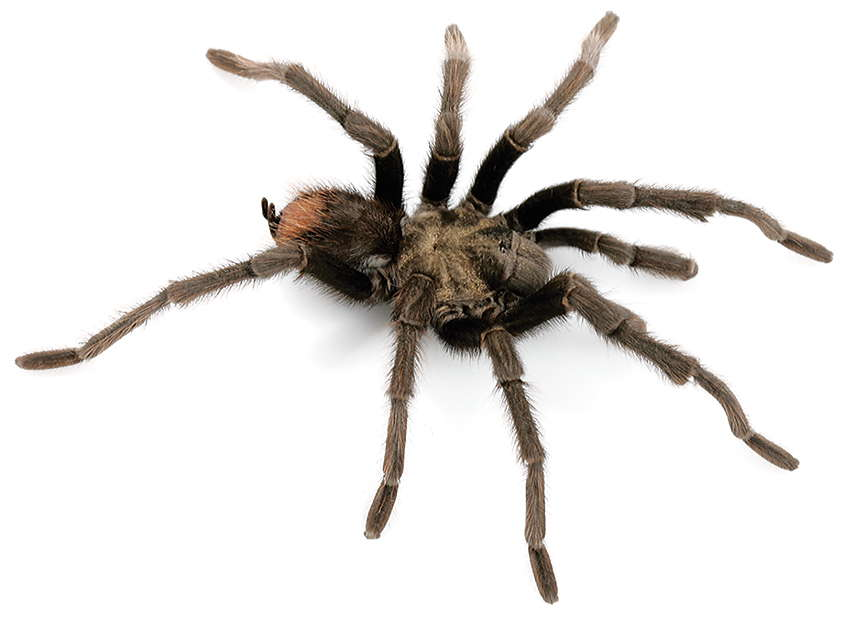
- Male

Scientific classification
- Kingdom: Animalia
- Phylum: Arthropoda
- Subphylum: Chelicerata
- Class: Arachnida
- Order: Araneae
- Infraorder: Mygalomorphae
- Family: Theraphosidae
- Genus: Aphonopelma
- Species: A. eutylenum

Binomial name
- Aphonopelma eutylenum Chamberlin, 1940

Synonyms
- Aphonopelma chambersi Smith, 1995; Aphonopelma clarum Chamberlin, 1940; Aphonopelma cryptethum Chamberlin, 1940; Aphonopelma sandersoni Smith, 1995; Aphonopelma sullivani Smith, 1995

= Aphonopelma eutylenum =

Species of spider

Aphonopelma eutylenum, commonly called California ebony tarantula, is a species of spider in the family Theraphosidae, found in the United States (California).

== Description ==
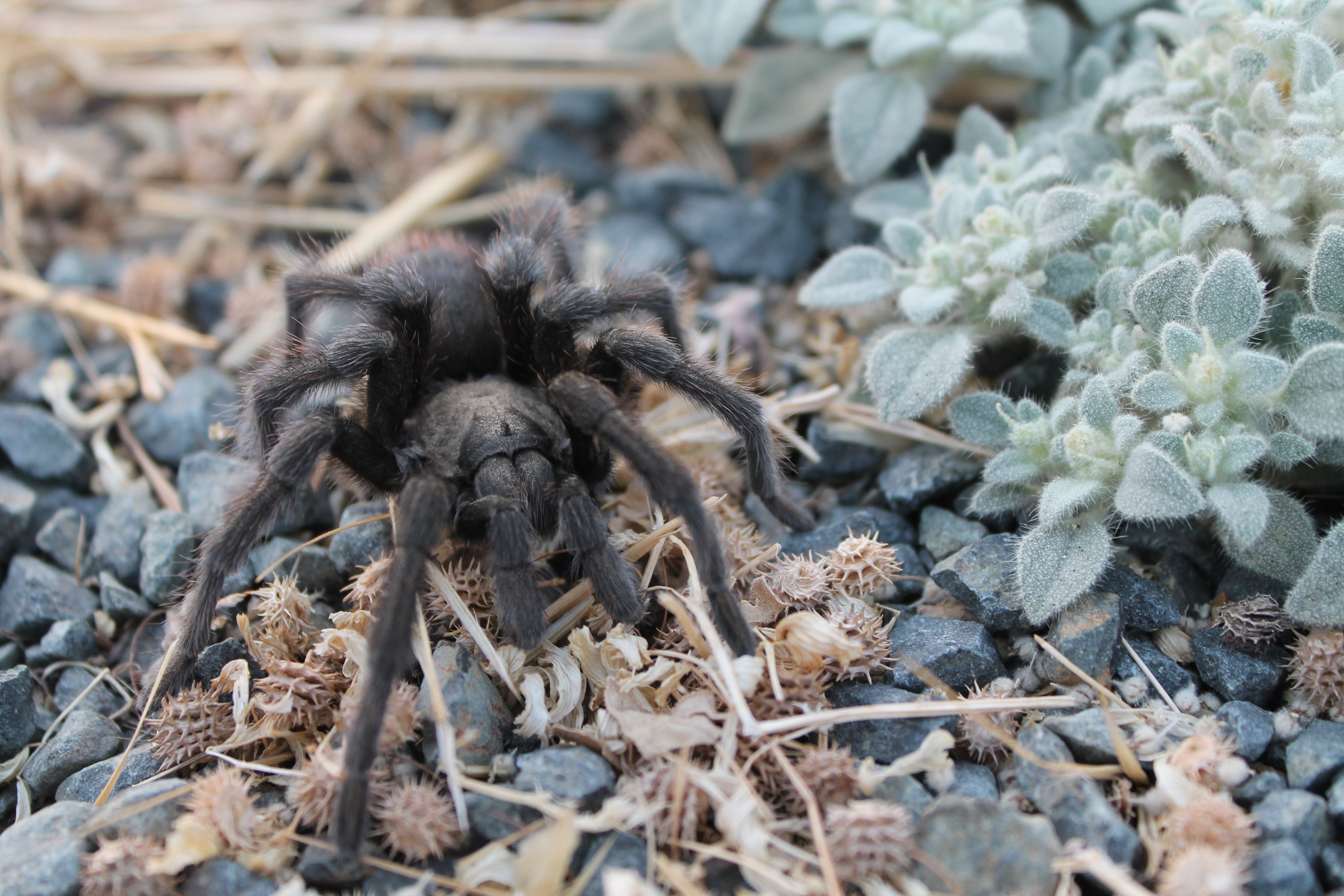
Near Exeter, CA

The body of the California ebony tarantula comes in various brown tones, ranging from light beige to dark brown and ebony colors. Adult females can reach a legspan of up to 13 cm (5 inches) and live to about 25 years of age. Males reach maturity after 8–12 years and leave their burrows after that in search of a mate. After spending all their energy on finding a suitable partner, they will die of exhaustion about 6 months after reaching adulthood.
