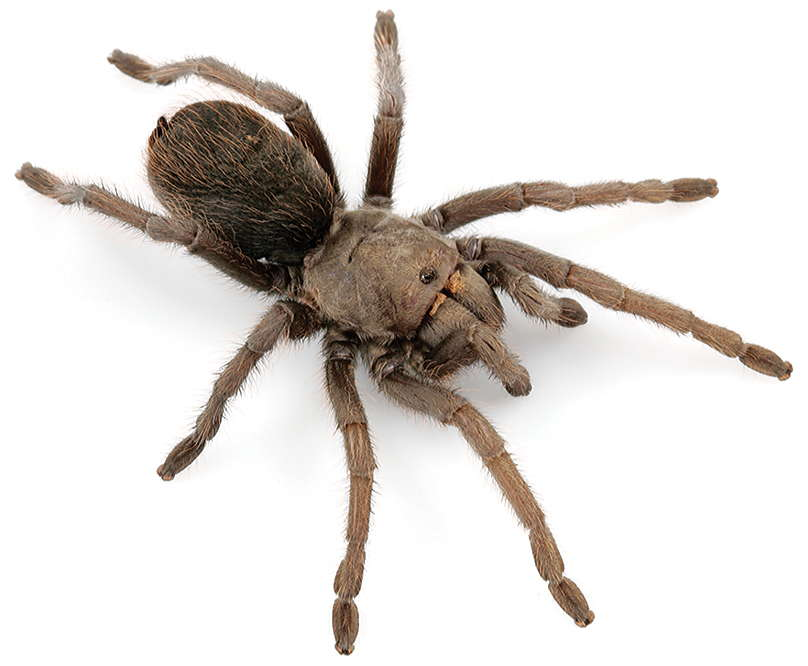
- Female
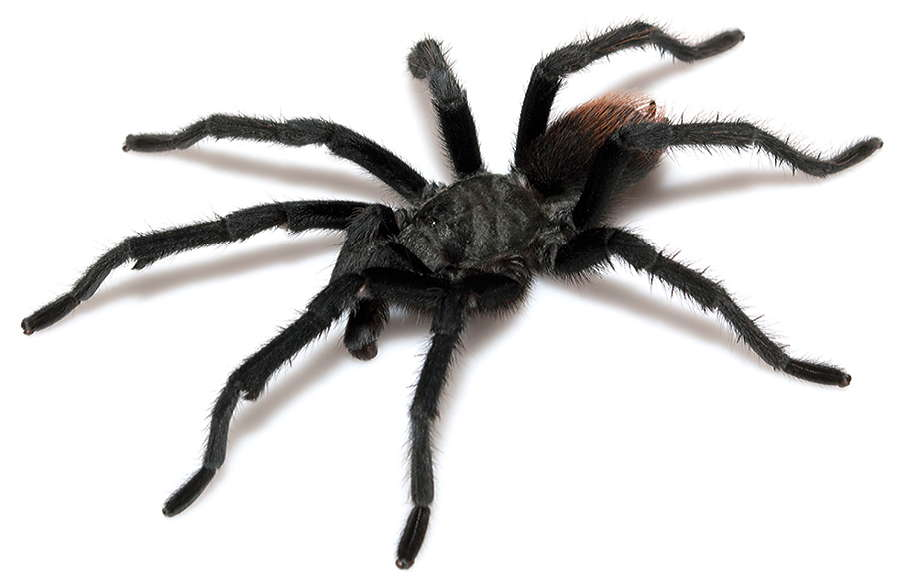
- Male

Scientific classification
- Kingdom: Animalia
- Phylum: Arthropoda
- Subphylum: Chelicerata
- Class: Arachnida
- Order: Araneae
- Infraorder: Mygalomorphae
- Family: Theraphosidae
- Genus: Aphonopelma
- Species: A. vorhiesi

Binomial name
- Aphonopelma vorhiesi (Chamberlin & Ivie, 1939)

= Aphonopelma vorhiesi =

Species of spider

Aphonopelma vorhiesi (also called the Tucson bronze or Madrean red rump) is a species of spider in the family Theraphosidae, found in Arizona and New Mexico. This species looks similar to the Aphonopelma chalcodes, but it is far more rare in captivity.
