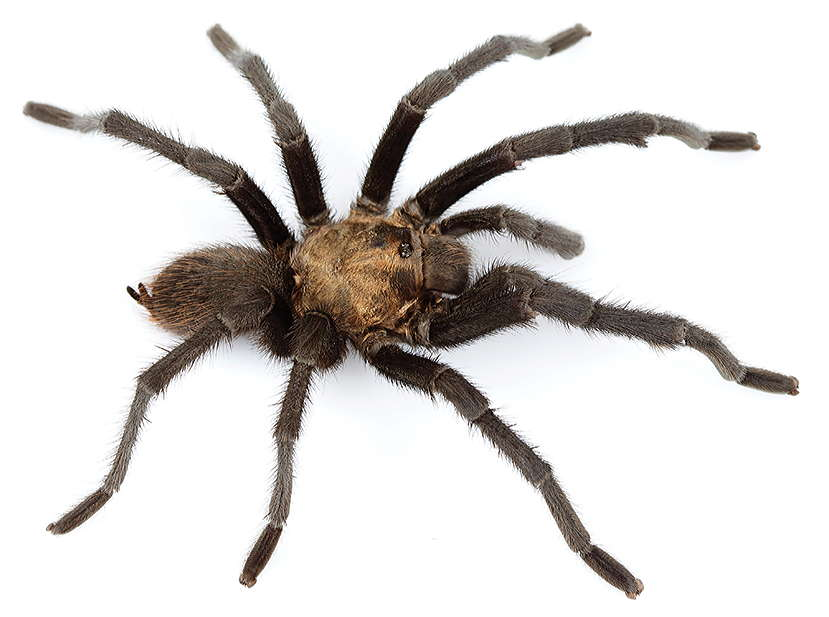
- male
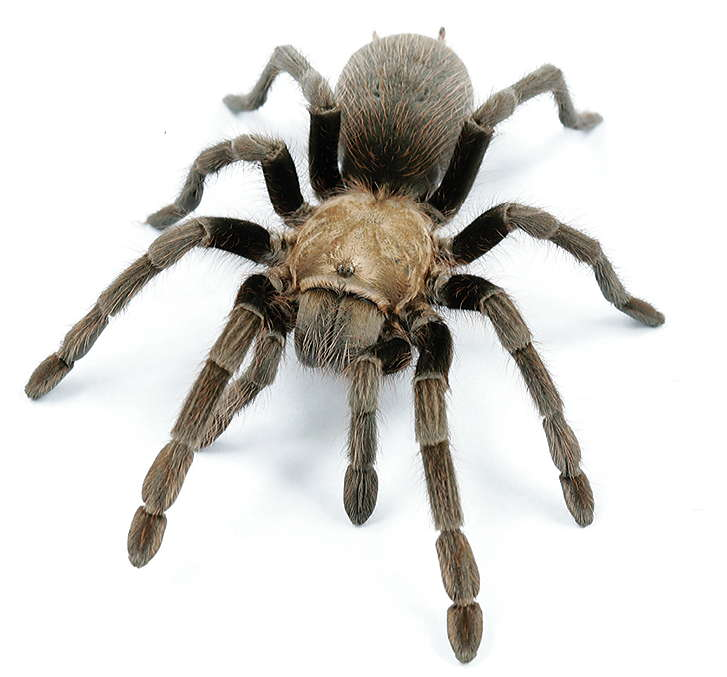
- female

Scientific classification
- Kingdom: Animalia
- Phylum: Arthropoda
- Subphylum: Chelicerata
- Class: Arachnida
- Order: Araneae
- Infraorder: Mygalomorphae
- Family: Theraphosidae
- Genus: Aphonopelma
- Species: A. armada

Binomial name
- Aphonopelma armada (Chamberlin, 1940)

Synonyms
- Aphonopelma arnoldi Smith, 1995

= Aphonopelma armada =

Species of spider

Aphonopelma armada is a species of spider in the family Theraphosidae, found in Texas in the United States.
