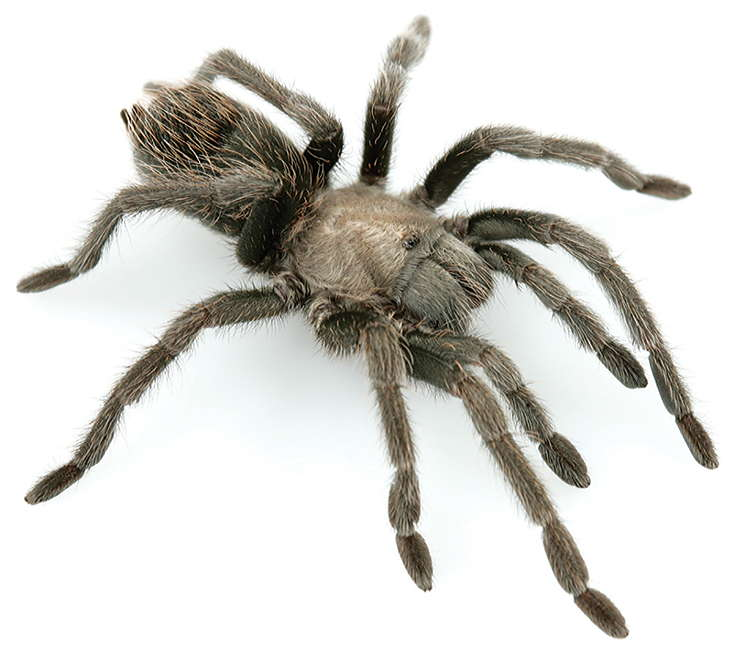
- Female
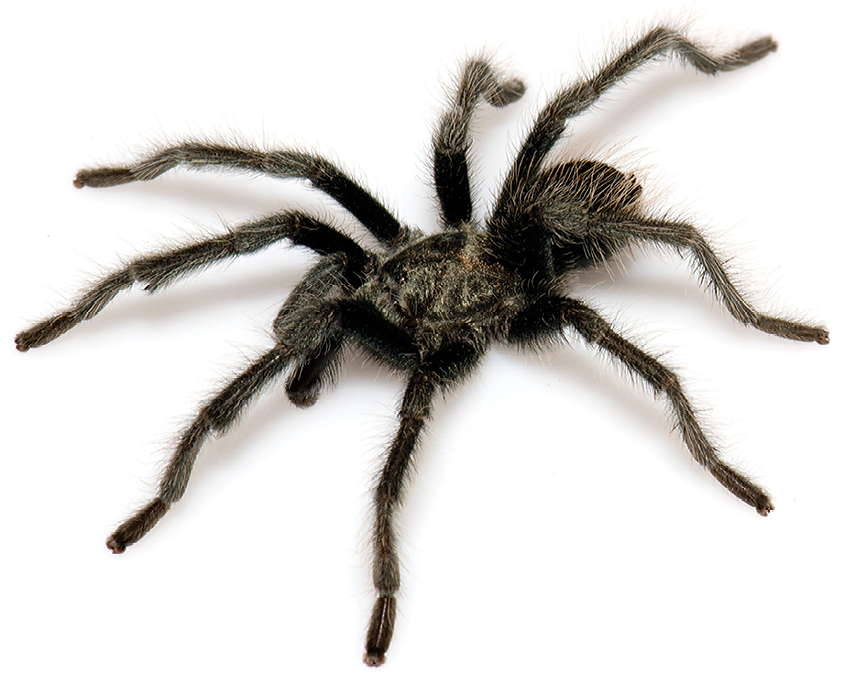
- Male

Scientific classification
- Domain: Eukaryota
- Kingdom: Animalia
- Phylum: Arthropoda
- Subphylum: Chelicerata
- Class: Arachnida
- Order: Araneae
- Infraorder: Mygalomorphae
- Family: Theraphosidae
- Genus: Aphonopelma
- Species: A. prenticei

Binomial name
- Aphonopelma prenticei Hamilton, Hendrixson & Bond, 2016

= Aphonopelma prenticei =

Species of spider

Aphonopelma prenticei is a species of spiders in the family Theraphosidae, found in United States (California, Nevada, Utah and Arizona).
