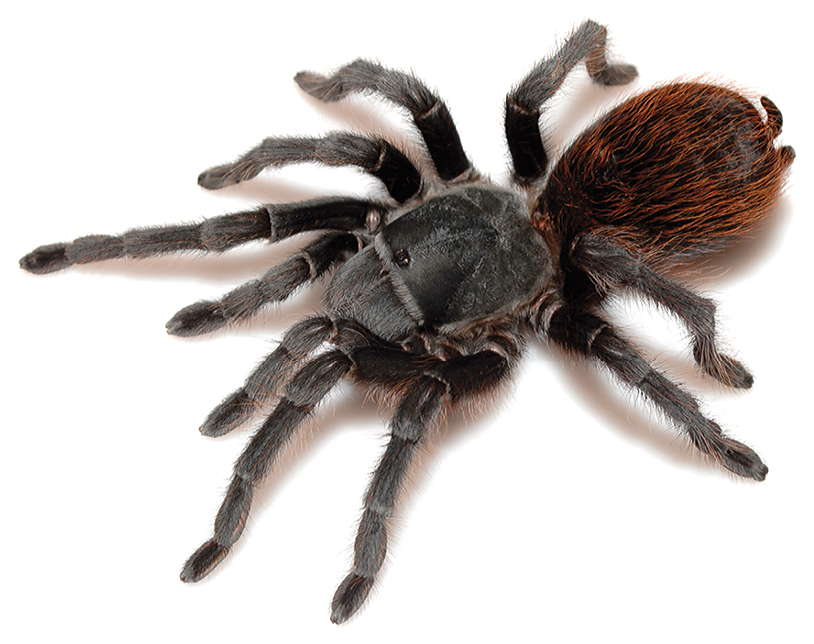
- Female
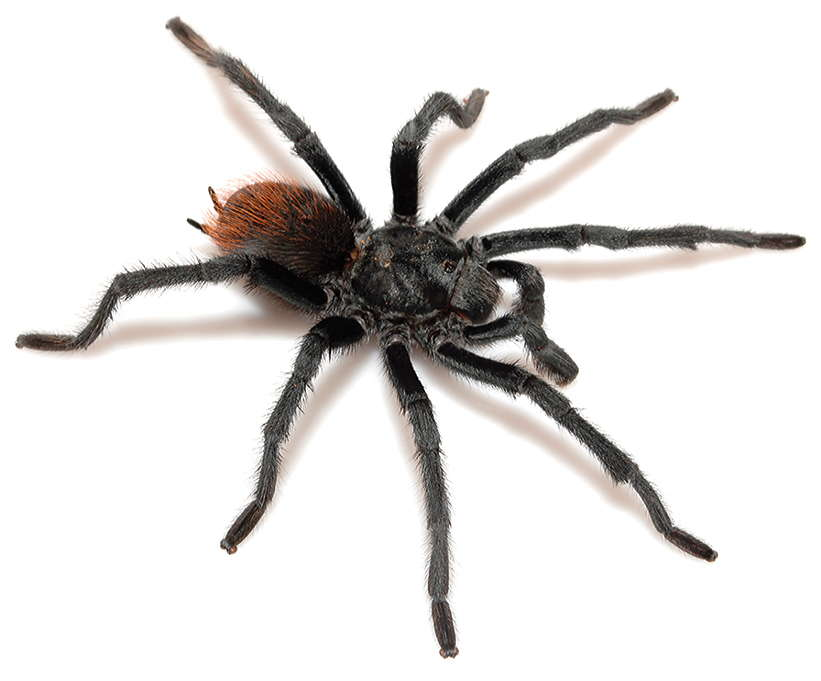
- Male

Scientific classification
- Domain: Eukaryota
- Kingdom: Animalia
- Phylum: Arthropoda
- Subphylum: Chelicerata
- Class: Arachnida
- Order: Araneae
- Infraorder: Mygalomorphae
- Family: Theraphosidae
- Genus: Aphonopelma
- Species: A. peloncillo

Binomial name
- Aphonopelma peloncillo Hamilton, Hendrixson & Bond, 2016

= Aphonopelma peloncillo =

Species of spider

Aphonopelma peloncillo is a species of spider in the family Theraphosidae, found in the United States (Arizona and New Mexico).
