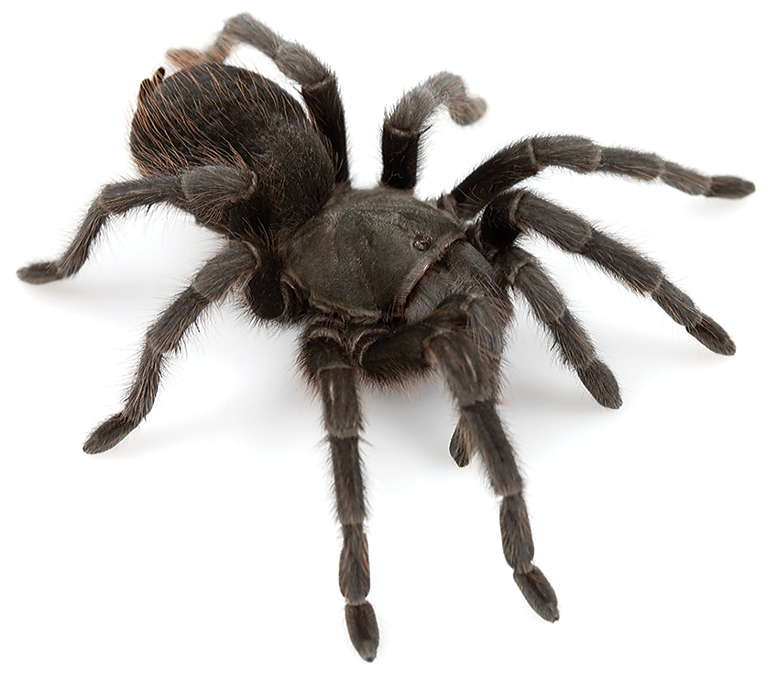
- Female
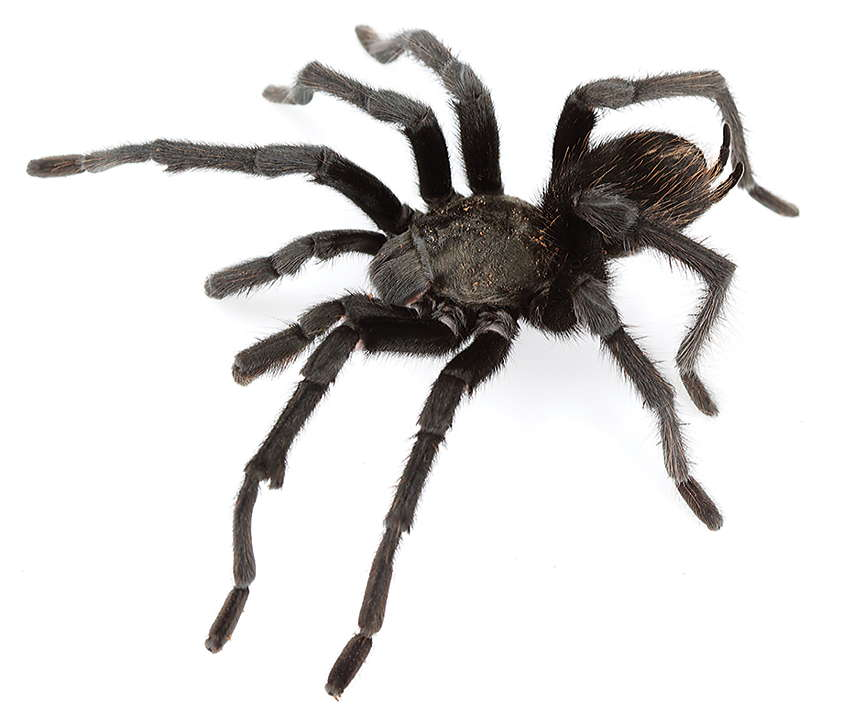
- Male

Scientific classification
- Kingdom: Animalia
- Phylum: Arthropoda
- Subphylum: Chelicerata
- Class: Arachnida
- Order: Araneae
- Infraorder: Mygalomorphae
- Family: Theraphosidae
- Genus: Aphonopelma
- Species: A. steindachneri

Binomial name
- Aphonopelma steindachneri (Ausserer, 1875)

Synonyms
- Aphonopelma phanum Chamberlin, 1940; Aphonopelma reversum Chamberlin, 1940

= Aphonopelma steindachneri =

Species of spider

Aphonopelma steindachneri, Steindachner's ebony tarantula, is a species of New World terrestrial spider in the family Theraphosidae, found in California and Mexico (Baja California). The species range is most centralized around the metropolitan areas of Los Angeles and San Diego, with its habitat being arid landscapes where it inhabits burrows in the ground. Similar to species in its genus Aphonopelma, the species is most active during its breeding season in summer and fall during the months from July to October, where males leave their burrows in search of mates. The species grows to a size of 12–13 centimeters (5 inches) in its diagonal leg span, with a coloration of velvet black or deep brown. Common predators of the species include other arthropods such as spider wasps in the genera Pepsis and Hemipepsis, centipedes, scorpions, solifugids, and wolf spiders (for juveniles).
