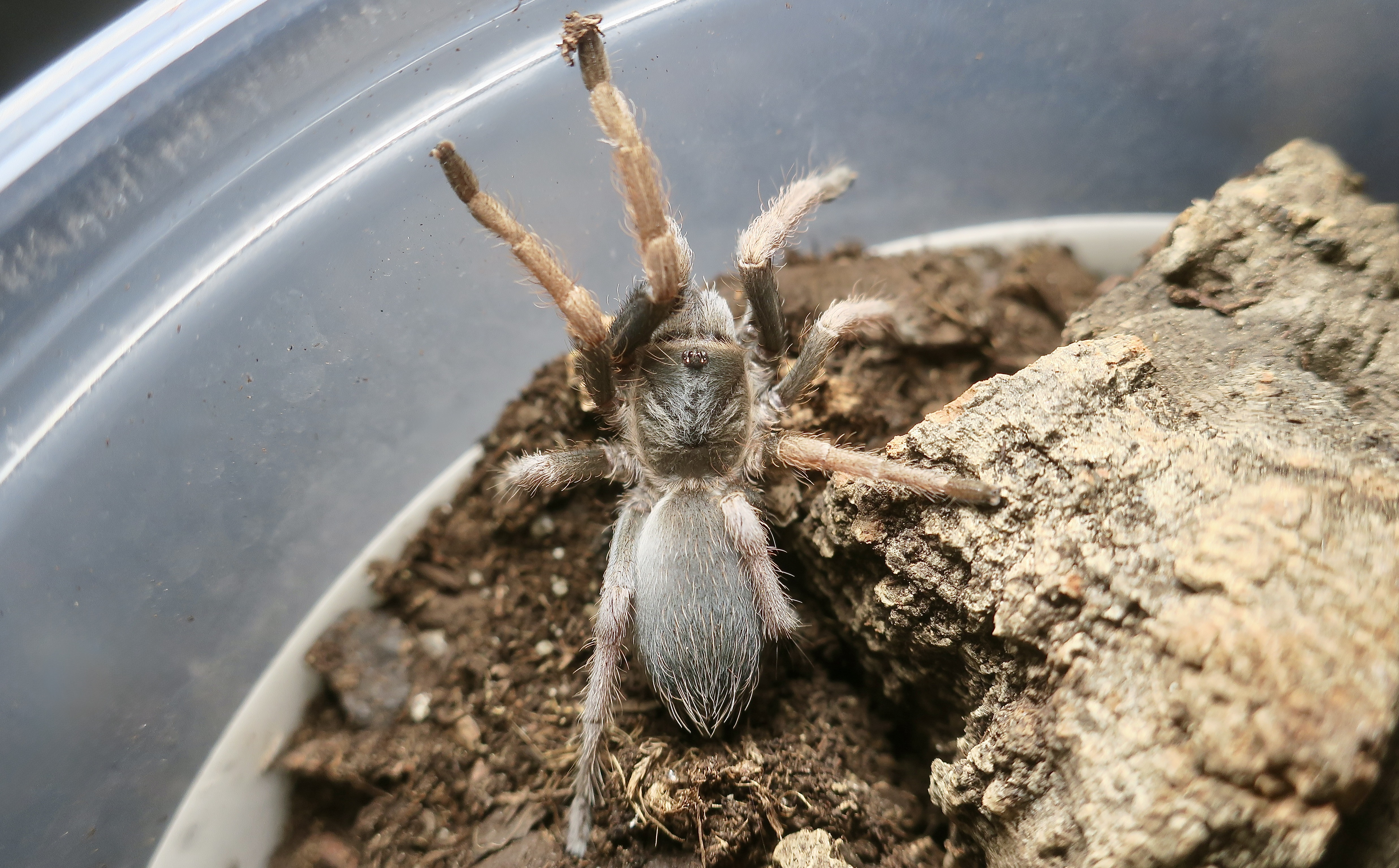
- A young specimen at 9th Island Reptiles, a store in Las Vegas

Scientific classification
- Kingdom: Animalia
- Phylum: Arthropoda
- Subphylum: Chelicerata
- Class: Arachnida
- Order: Araneae
- Infraorder: Mygalomorphae
- Family: Theraphosidae
- Genus: Sandinista; Longhorn & Gabriel, 2019
- Species: S. lanceolatum

Binomial name
- Sandinista lanceolatum Valerio, 1980

Synonyms
- Eurypelma lanceolatum Simon, 1891; Brachypelma fossoria Valerio, 1980; Brachypelma fossorium (Valerio, 1980); Aphonopelma lanceolatum (Simon, 1891); Stichoplastoris fossorius (Valerio, 1980)

= Sandinista lanceolatum =

Species of spider

Sandinista lanceolatum (synonyms including Aphonopelma lanceolatum and Brachypelma fossorium) is a species of spider in the family Theraphosidae (tarantulas), native to Nicaragua and Costa Rica. As of July 2026, it was the only species in the genus Sandinista.

== Description ==
Sandinista lanceolatum is a relatively small spider compared to many other Central American tarantulas. For a pair of Costa Rican specimens, the author Carlos Valerio described a few select attributes such as a cephalothorax less than 18 mm long: being 14 mm in his holotype male and 16 mm in the paratype female. Valerio also indicated that the fourth leg is the longest: 43 mm in the holotype male and 54 mm in the paratype female. The body and legs are covered with reddish brown hairs (setae). The "brush" of hairs (scopula) on the metatarsus of the fourth leg is short, limited to the distal third. The male's palpal bulb is less than 4 mm long; the spermatheca of the female is of slightly less width. Females have larger chelicerae than males. Such attributes are generally not considered as useful in subsequent works, for example with males since shown to be highly variable, i.e. see Longhorn and Gabriel 2019.

== Taxonomy ==
The taxonomic history of this species is somewhat tangled. As now understood, it was first described by Eugène Simon in 1891 as Eurypelma lanceolatum. Under this name, it was transferred to the genus Aphonopelma as Aphonopelma lanceolatum in 1993. Separately, in 1980, Carlos Valerio described a species as Brachypelma fossoria, with the specific name referring to the "fossorial" or burrowing habits of the species. The specific name was amended to fossorium by Günter Schmidt in 1992, as Brachypelma is neuter in gender. In 2019, Stuart Longhorn and Ray Gabriel synonymized Brachypelma fossoria with Aphonopelma lanceolatum, and transferred the species to the new genus Sandinista. In 2020, Jorge Mendoza and Oscar Francke transferred Brachypelma fossoria to the genus Stichoplastoris, without recognizing the synonymy with Sandinista lanceolatum. As of July 2026, the World Spider Catalog used the name Sandinista lanceolatum.

== Distribution and habitat ==
Sandinista lanceolatum is found in the Guanacaste Province in Costa Rica in the north-west Pacific lowlands, and several Departments of Nicaragua in similar western lowlands. It is found in grasslands in dry tropical areas. The female described by Valerio was collected from a horizontal burrow that she shared with several juveniles. The relatively large chelicerae of the females may be connected to their burrowing habit.

== Conservation ==
All species of Brachypelma, then including Sandinista lanceolatum as B. fossorium, were placed on CITES Appendix II in 1994, thus restricting trade.
