= Aphonopelma chamberlini =

Scientific classification
- Domain: Eukaryota
- Kingdom: Animalia
- Phylum: Arthropoda
- Subphylum: Chelicerata
- Class: Arachnida
- Order: Araneae
- Infraorder: Mygalomorphae
- Family: Theraphosidae
- Genus: Aphonopelma
- Species: A. chamberlini

Binomial name
- Aphonopelma chamberlini Smith, 1995

Synonyms
- Aphonopelma iodius (Chamberlin & Ivie, 1939)

Species of spider

Aphonopelma chamberlini, also known as the Paso Robles rusty red tarantula, is regarded by some sources as a tarantula species endemic to California, and by others as synonymous with Aphonopelma iodius.

Described in 1995, it is known from the vicinity of Paso Robles, California. Females are around 66 mm (2.6 in) long, and the body color is a uniform reddish brown with light rusty red setae (hairs) on the legs. The species name honors arachnologist Ralph Vary Chamberlin, who was responsible for naming a large number of Aphonopelma species.

A 2013 study suggested A. chamberlini was synonymous with Aphonopelma brunnius, which has since been included in Aphonopelma iodius.
