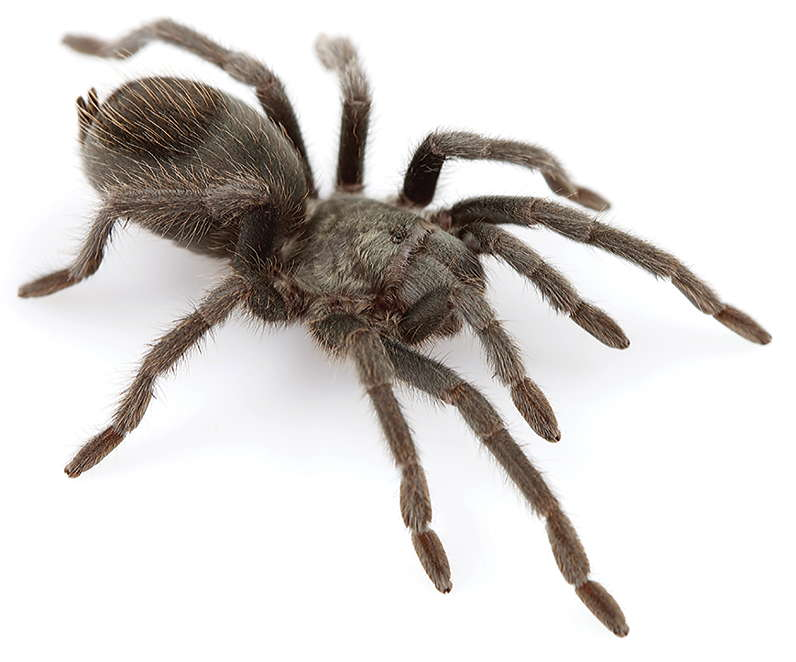
- Female
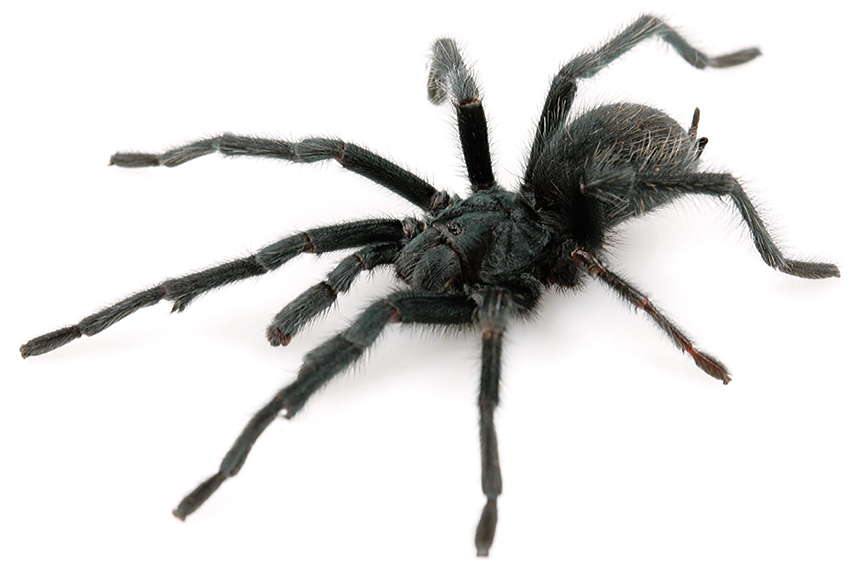
- Male

Scientific classification
- Domain: Eukaryota
- Kingdom: Animalia
- Phylum: Arthropoda
- Subphylum: Chelicerata
- Class: Arachnida
- Order: Araneae
- Infraorder: Mygalomorphae
- Family: Theraphosidae
- Genus: Aphonopelma
- Species: A. mojave

Binomial name
- Aphonopelma mojave Prentice, 1997

= Aphonopelma mojave =

Species of spider

Aphonopelma mojave is a species of spider, in the family Theraphosidae (tarantulas).

It is native to the Mojave Desert in Southern California, United States.
