= Aphonopelma moellendorfi =

Scientific classification
- Domain: Eukaryota
- Kingdom: Animalia
- Phylum: Arthropoda
- Subphylum: Chelicerata
- Class: Arachnida
- Order: Araneae
- Infraorder: Mygalomorphae
- Family: Theraphosidae
- Genus: Aphonopelma
- Species: A. moellendorfi

Binomial name
- Aphonopelma moellendorfi Hamilton, 2016

Species of spider

Aphonopelma moellendorfi is a species of spider in the family Theraphosidae, found in United States (Texas).
