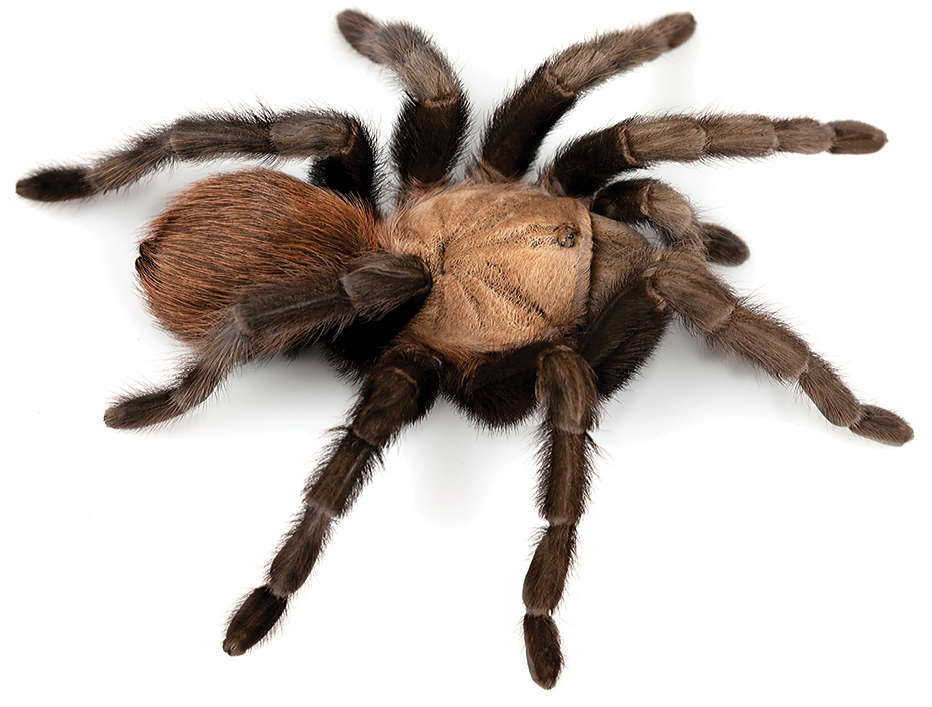
- Female
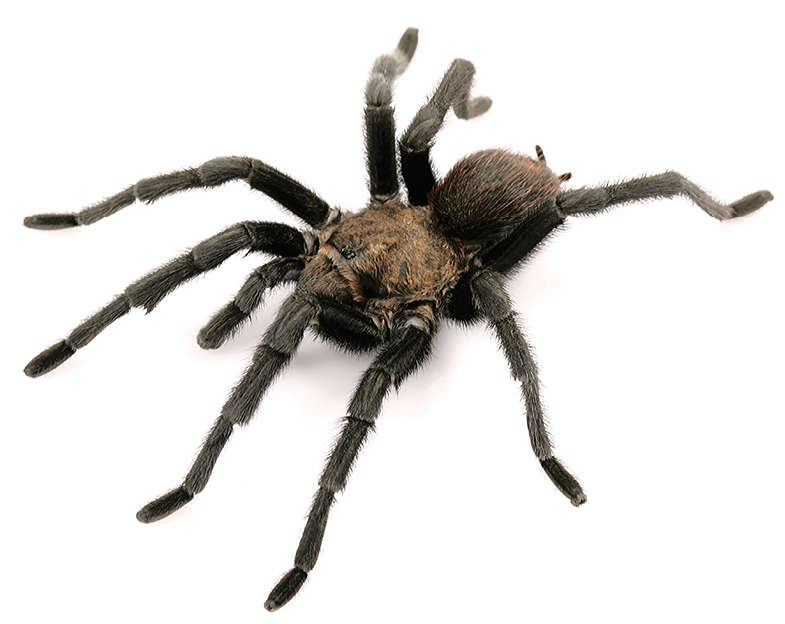
- Male

Scientific classification
- Kingdom: Animalia
- Phylum: Arthropoda
- Subphylum: Chelicerata
- Class: Arachnida
- Order: Araneae
- Infraorder: Mygalomorphae
- Family: Theraphosidae
- Genus: Aphonopelma
- Species: A. anax

Binomial name
- Aphonopelma anax Chamberlin, 1940

Synonyms
- Aphonopelma breenei Smith, 1995

= Aphonopelma anax =

Species of spider

Aphonopelma anax, commonly known as the Texas tan tarantula, is a species of spider belonging to the family Theraphosidae native to southern Texas and northern Mexico.

== Description ==
The species is one of the largest tarantulas found in the United States, as it commonly reaches a leg span of 5 inches at full maturity with some females reaching a 6-inch span. Like most Aphonopelma species, it has a very slow growth rate and lives for several years before maturing. As in most tarantulas, females are massive as compared to the males with considerably more bulk. Males tend to have longer leg spans, a smaller body, and also have bulbs on the end of their pedipalps once they reach maturity. These are used for mating.

As the name suggests, the coloration of A. anax primarily consists of tan colors and dark shades of brown. It is similar in coloration to Aphonopelma hentzi, another common Texas species, but is considerably darker. This species has urticating hairs like many New World tarantulas, but lacks any stridulating hairs on their chelicerae.

== Distribution and habitat ==
The Texas tan tarantula is found in Southeastern Texas, and has been documented in Cameron County and Kleberg County. They are also found in Northern Mexico. This puts their range in a semiarid climate, and they can be found in the grasslands and shrub forests that line the region, as well as within cities.

This species, like most tarantulas, does not build a typical web and instead lives within a silk-lined burrow. These burrows may be created by the tarantula itself, but in the majority of cases, the tarantula will simply modify a preexisting burrow or other suitable habitat. These kinds of habitats can include dead trees, empty rodent burrows, stacks of wood, or natural crevices.

== Life cycle ==
Females of A. anax can lay hundreds of eggs at a time. The eggs are laid within an egg sac weaved by the female, which is aggressively guarded within the burrow. The female also turns the egg sac to prevent deformations in a process called brooding. Eggs hatch after several weeks, and the spider-lings may stay with the females for some time before dispersing to fend for themselves.

Females have been known to live up to 40 years. However, no studies have lasted this long, so the lifespan may be longer. Males rarely live over two years after they have matured.

== Behavior ==
=== Relations with humans ===
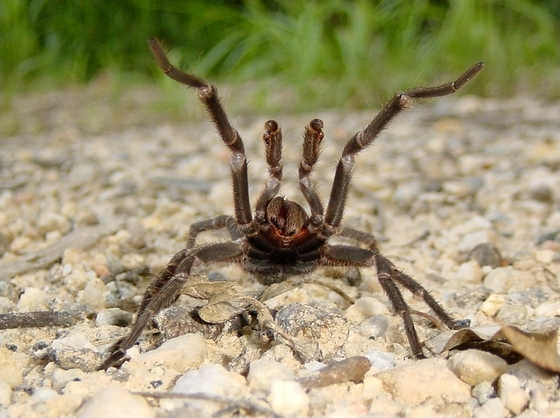
A typical threat posture by a mature male. (note: not A. anax, but a similar species)

Similar to many tarantula species, A. Anax is non-aggressive and avoids confrontations with humans and larger animals. This docile temperament makes it very desirable in the pet trade, along with A. hentzi. If provoked, however, the tarantula will use its hind legs to kick off some of its urticating hairs towards the potential threat. If these hairs reach the mucous membranes or bare skin, they can cause mild swelling and/or a rash. Humans may have an allergic skin reaction which can worsen symptoms. The reactions can last for several hours to weeks. In addition to kicking its urticating hairs, A. Anax will rear up on its hind legs and raise its front legs in the typical tarantula "threat posture". This is done to intimidate a potential predator.

=== Mating behavior ===
A. anax follows the typical mating pattern of tarantulas. Once a male reaches maturity, it begins to weave a web in preparation of its journey to mate. It then rubs its abdomen on top of the web to release semen, which it then absorbs into the tips of its pedipalps. The semen is then kept viable until a mate has been found. When it detects a female, the two spiders then exchange different signals (usually a rhythmic drumming of the legs) to assure that they are the same species. If the female is willing to mate, the male will approach her, lift her upper body up, and then inserts his pedipalps into the female reproductive organ, which is located on the lower abdomen. After mating is complete, the male quickly leaves to avoid becoming a meal for the female. Females do not usually show aggression after mating, but it is known to happen.
