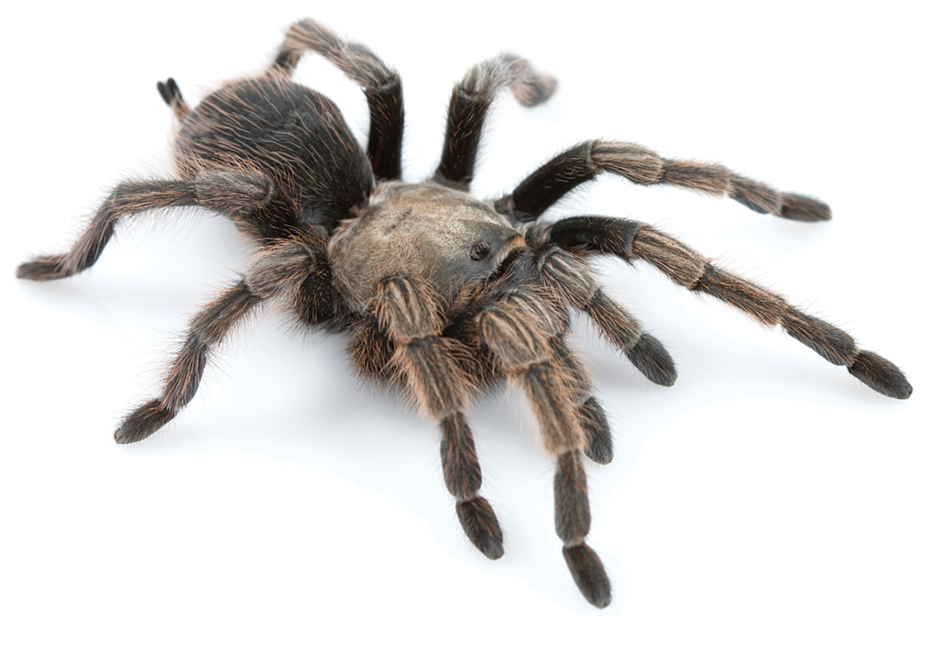
- Female
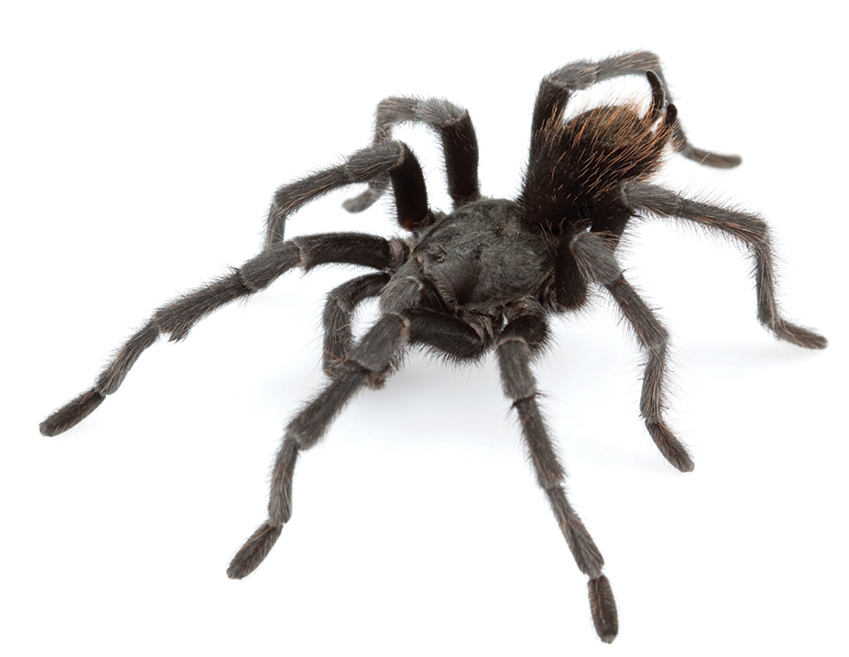
- Male

Scientific classification
- Domain: Eukaryota
- Kingdom: Animalia
- Phylum: Arthropoda
- Subphylum: Chelicerata
- Class: Arachnida
- Order: Araneae
- Infraorder: Mygalomorphae
- Family: Theraphosidae
- Genus: Aphonopelma
- Species: A. johnnycashi

Binomial name
- Aphonopelma johnnycashi Hamilton, 2016

= Aphonopelma johnnycashi =

Species of spider

Aphonopelma johnnycashi is a species of tarantula (family Theraphosidae). It was found in 2015 near Folsom Prison in California and named after Johnny Cash, whose song "Folsom Prison Blues" made the prison famous. Mature males are generally black, and the country music singer was also known as "The Man in Black".

== Natural history ==
This spider can be up to 6 inches (15 cm) long, the male of the species is black and the female is a dark brown. Like most North American tarantulas, they are relatively harmless to humans, unlikely to bite and with venom only mildly irritating.

The new categorization of this spider is part of an effort to more carefully catalog American tarantula species. For decades there has been a suspicion that there are more species than identified, but that they are similar enough to be overlooked. The new effort has broken them down according to behavior and observable traits, though there has not been genetic testing done to truly ascertain where the species lines are drawn.
