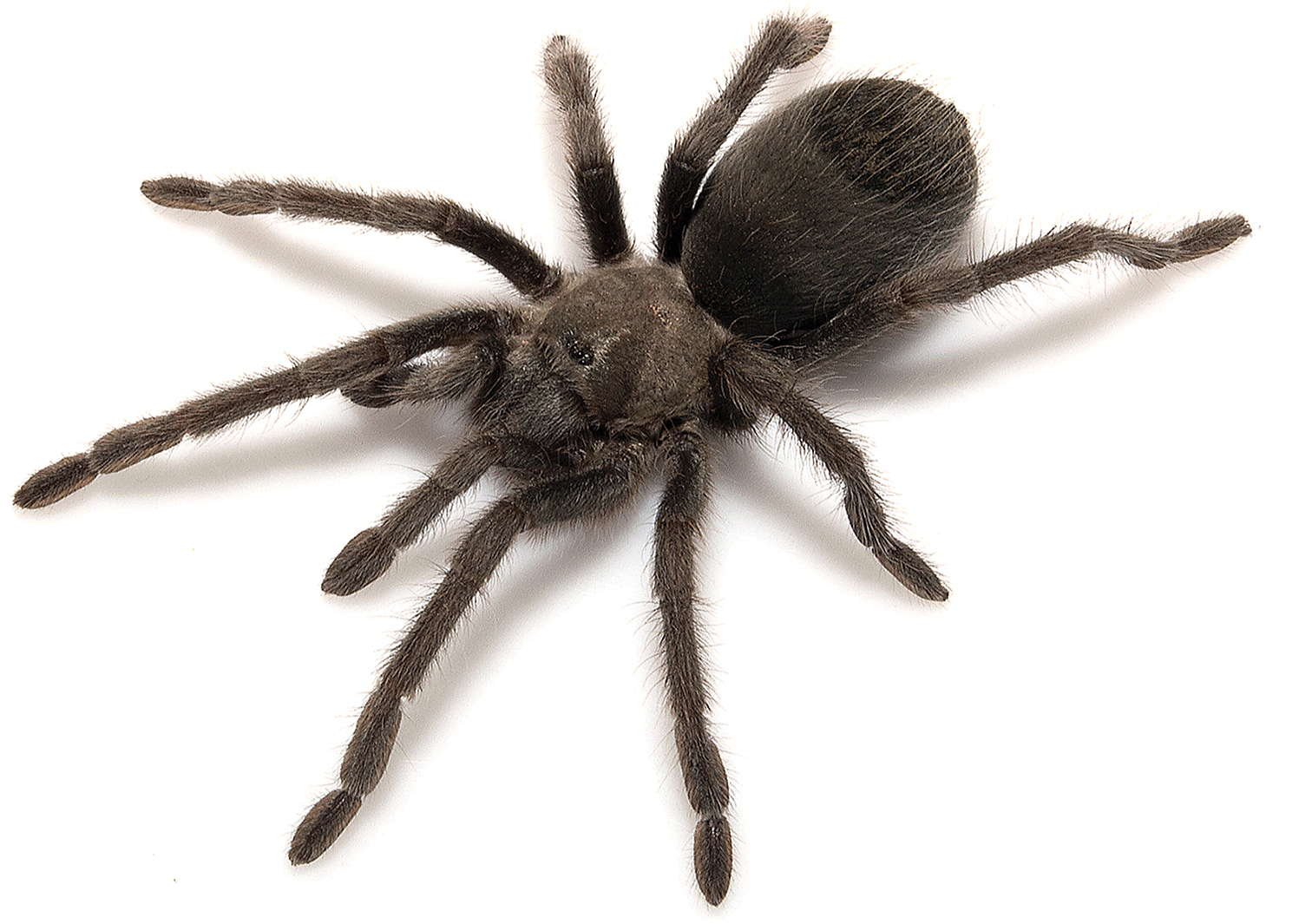
- Female

Scientific classification
- Domain: Eukaryota
- Kingdom: Animalia
- Phylum: Arthropoda
- Subphylum: Chelicerata
- Class: Arachnida
- Order: Araneae
- Infraorder: Mygalomorphae
- Family: Theraphosidae
- Genus: Aphonopelma
- Species: A. atomicum

Binomial name
- Aphonopelma atomicum Hamilton, 2016

= Aphonopelma atomicum =

Species of spider

Aphonopelma atomicum is a species of spiders in the family Theraphosidae, found in United States (California, Nevada). Like many New World tarantulas, they flick urticating hairs at attackers if threatened.
