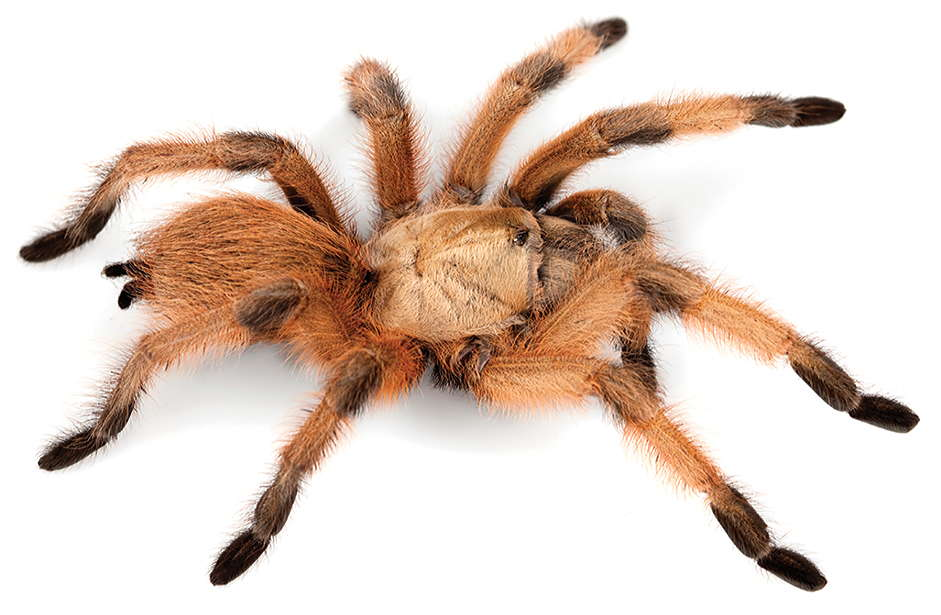
- Female
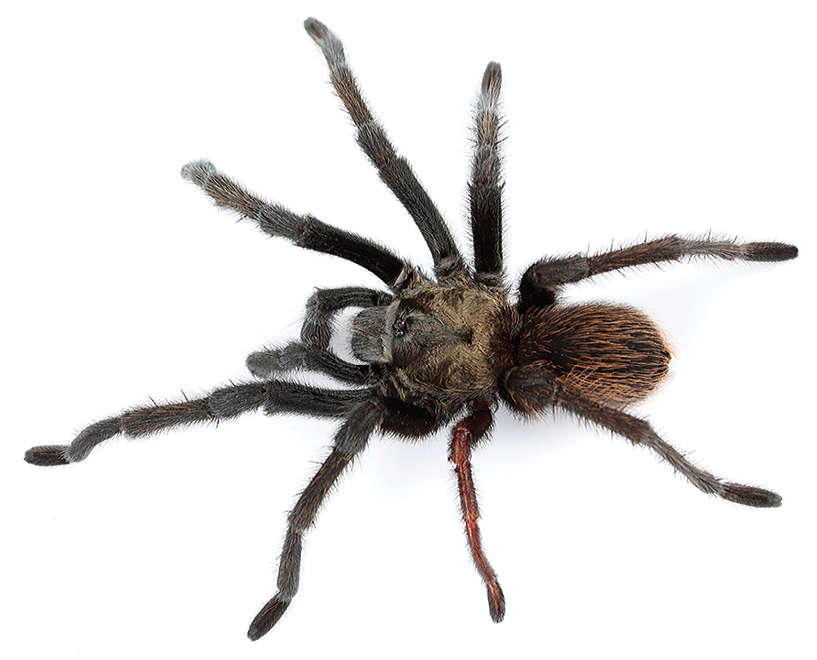
- Male

Scientific classification
- Kingdom: Animalia
- Phylum: Arthropoda
- Subphylum: Chelicerata
- Class: Arachnida
- Order: Araneae
- Infraorder: Mygalomorphae
- Family: Theraphosidae
- Genus: Aphonopelma
- Species: A. moderatum

Binomial name
- Aphonopelma moderatum (Chamberlin & Ivie, 1939)

Synonyms
- Aphonopelma heterops Chamberlin, 1940

= Aphonopelma moderatum =

Species of spider

Aphonopelma moderatum is a species of spider in the family Theraphosidae, found in United States, in the state of Texas. Commonly called the Rio Grande Gold Tarantula as they are found in the Rio Grande Valley of Texas.

== Description ==
=== Females ===
Females live around 22 to 40 years. They own an orange to tan carapace with a slightly darker opisthosoma. The legs are mainly orange, beginning with an orange femur, with a black patella, followed by an orange tibia, while the tarsus and metatarsus are fully black.

=== Males ===
Males live around 7 years, owning a dark brown carapace, with a black opisthosoma covered by dark orange hairs. While the legs are completely black.

== Behavior ==
In captivity they are known for their docile nature; if frightened they may fling hairs or run away, though this is unusual. In very rare cases this spider may bite, though the venom is mild. While spiderlings are more prone to burrowing, captive adults will usually find a hide instead of burrowing, and will often stay out in the open.
