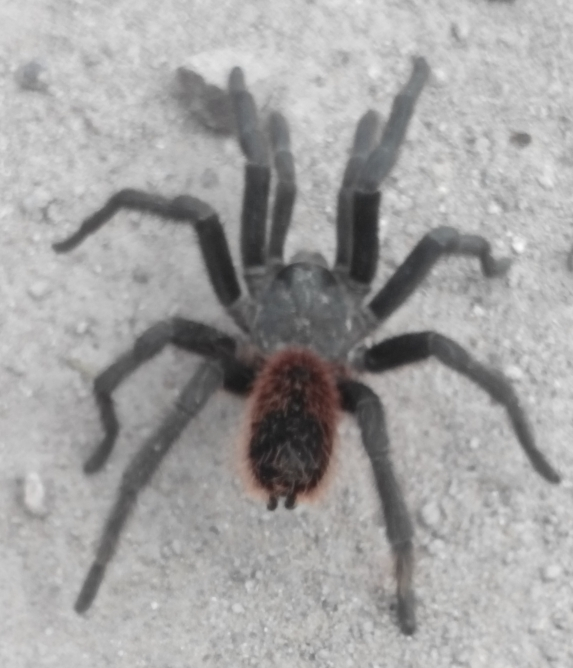

Scientific classification
- Domain: Eukaryota
- Kingdom: Animalia
- Phylum: Arthropoda
- Subphylum: Chelicerata
- Class: Arachnida
- Order: Araneae
- Infraorder: Mygalomorphae
- Family: Theraphosidae
- Genus: Aphonopelma
- Species: A. caniceps

Binomial name
- Aphonopelma caniceps (Simon, 1891)

= Aphonopelma caniceps =

Species of spider

Aphonopelma caniceps is a species of spider in the family Theraphosidae, found in Mexico. This species was first described as Eurypelma caniceps in 1891 by Eugène Simon, and was transferred to the genus, Aphonopelma, in 1993 by Günter Schmidt.
