= Aphonopelma phasmus =

Scientific classification
- Kingdom: Animalia
- Phylum: Arthropoda
- Subphylum: Chelicerata
- Class: Arachnida
- Order: Araneae
- Infraorder: Mygalomorphae
- Family: Theraphosidae
- Genus: Aphonopelma
- Species: A. phasmus

Binomial name
- Aphonopelma phasmus Chamberlin, 1940

Species of spider

Aphonopelma phasmus is a species of spider in the family Theraphosidae. It is only known from a single adult male collected near the Colorado River in the Grand Canyon National Park in Coconino County, Arizona. The female is unknown.
