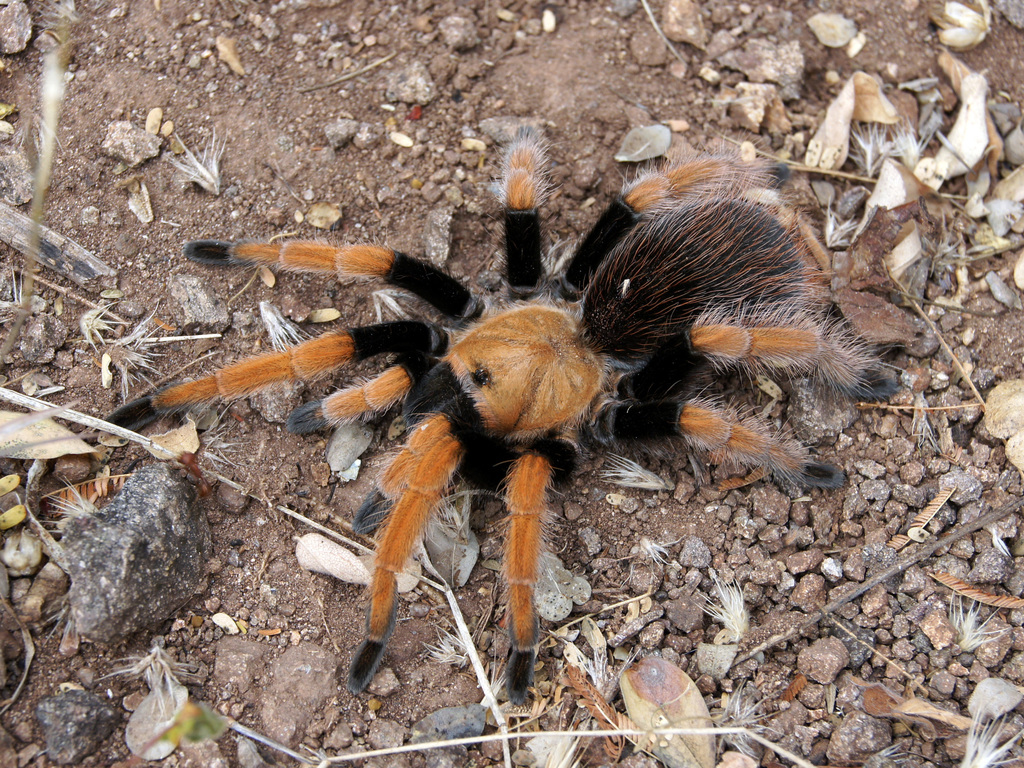

Scientific classification
- Kingdom: Animalia
- Phylum: Arthropoda
- Subphylum: Chelicerata
- Class: Arachnida
- Order: Araneae
- Infraorder: Mygalomorphae
- Family: Theraphosidae
- Genus: Aphonopelma
- Species: A. bicoloratum

Binomial name
- Aphonopelma bicoloratum Struchen, Brändle & Schmidt, 1996

= Aphonopelma bicoloratum =

Species of spider

Aphonopelma bicoloratum (also known as Mexican blood leg), is a species of tarantula found in Mexico. As its common name aptly states it is found in Mexico, and was first described by Ronny Struchen, D. Brändle and Gunter Schmidt in 1996. It is named after the Latin word bicoloratum, meaning bicolored.

== Description ==
As its common name suggests, its legs are an orange color, which ranges from the metatarsus to the femur, the tarsus and trochanters being black. Its carapace is the same orange color as the legs, with the opisthosoma and chelicerae being black. The opisthosoma is also covered with long slender reddish hairs. Females live around 20 to 25 years, and males 5 to 7 years, under proper care.

== Habitat ==
It is found in South Western Mexico, though it is not clearly stated where, their habitats where they are found are mainly deserts and scrublands, alongside the Pacific side of the country. The deserts and scrublands of South Western Mexico, are few and far between. This are found mainly in Puebla, where the main plants are Agave, Yuca, Opuntia, Aristida and Stipa. The average yearly rain fall is 450mm and 22 °C is the average temperature.

== Behavior ==
As a New World species, this tarantula possesses urticating hairs, which it may kick if it feels threatened. As a terrestrial species, it does not usually make webs or burrows. Similarly to other species in its genus, it is considered docile and slow moving.
