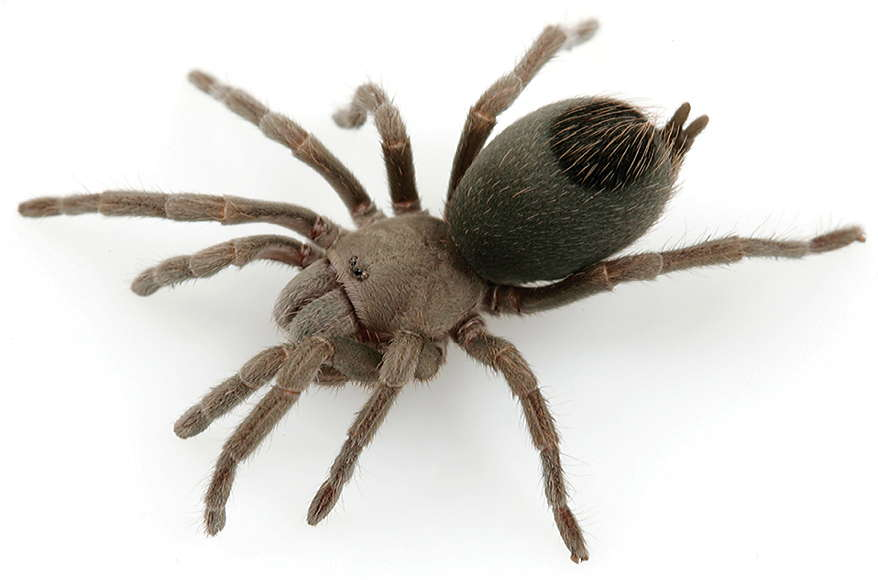
- Female

Scientific classification
- Domain: Eukaryota
- Kingdom: Animalia
- Phylum: Arthropoda
- Subphylum: Chelicerata
- Class: Arachnida
- Order: Araneae
- Infraorder: Mygalomorphae
- Family: Theraphosidae
- Genus: Aphonopelma
- Species: A. paloma

Binomial name
- Aphonopelma paloma Prentice, 1993

= Aphonopelma paloma =

Species of spider

Aphonopelma paloma, or the Paloma dwarf, is a species of spider belonging to the family Theraphosidae.

== Distribution and habitat ==
The Paloma dwarf can be found in Southern Arizona, but requires meticulous surveying to spot. This is not only due to their small size, as the entrances of their burrows are usually only 5–10 mm in width.
