= Aphonopelma truncatum =

Scientific classification
- Domain: Eukaryota
- Kingdom: Animalia
- Phylum: Arthropoda
- Subphylum: Chelicerata
- Class: Arachnida
- Order: Araneae
- Infraorder: Mygalomorphae
- Family: Theraphosidae
- Genus: Aphonopelma
- Species: A. truncatum

Binomial name
- Aphonopelma truncatum F. O. Pickard-Cambridge, 1897

Species of spider

Aphonopelma truncatum is a species of spider in the family Theraphosidae, found in Mexico.
