= Aphonopelma helluo =

Scientific classification
- Kingdom: Animalia
- Phylum: Arthropoda
- Subphylum: Chelicerata
- Class: Arachnida
- Order: Araneae
- Infraorder: Mygalomorphae
- Family: Theraphosidae
- Genus: Aphonopelma
- Species: A. helluo

Binomial name
- Aphonopelma helluo Simon, 1891

Species of spider

Aphonopelma helluo is a species of spider in the family Theraphosidae, found in Mexico.
