= Aphonopelma serratum =

Scientific classification
- Domain: Eukaryota
- Kingdom: Animalia
- Phylum: Arthropoda
- Subphylum: Chelicerata
- Class: Arachnida
- Order: Araneae
- Infraorder: Mygalomorphae
- Family: Theraphosidae
- Genus: Aphonopelma
- Species: A. serratum

Binomial name
- Aphonopelma serratum (Simon, 1891)

Species of spider

Aphonopelma serratum is a species of spider in the family Theraphosidae, found in Mexico. This species was first described as Eurypelma serratum in 1891 by Eugène Simon, and was transferred to the genus, Aphonopelma, in 1993 by Günter Schmidt.

Alvarez (2014) comments that A. serratum can be difficult to distinguish from A. anitahoffmannae since they both have similar colouring.
