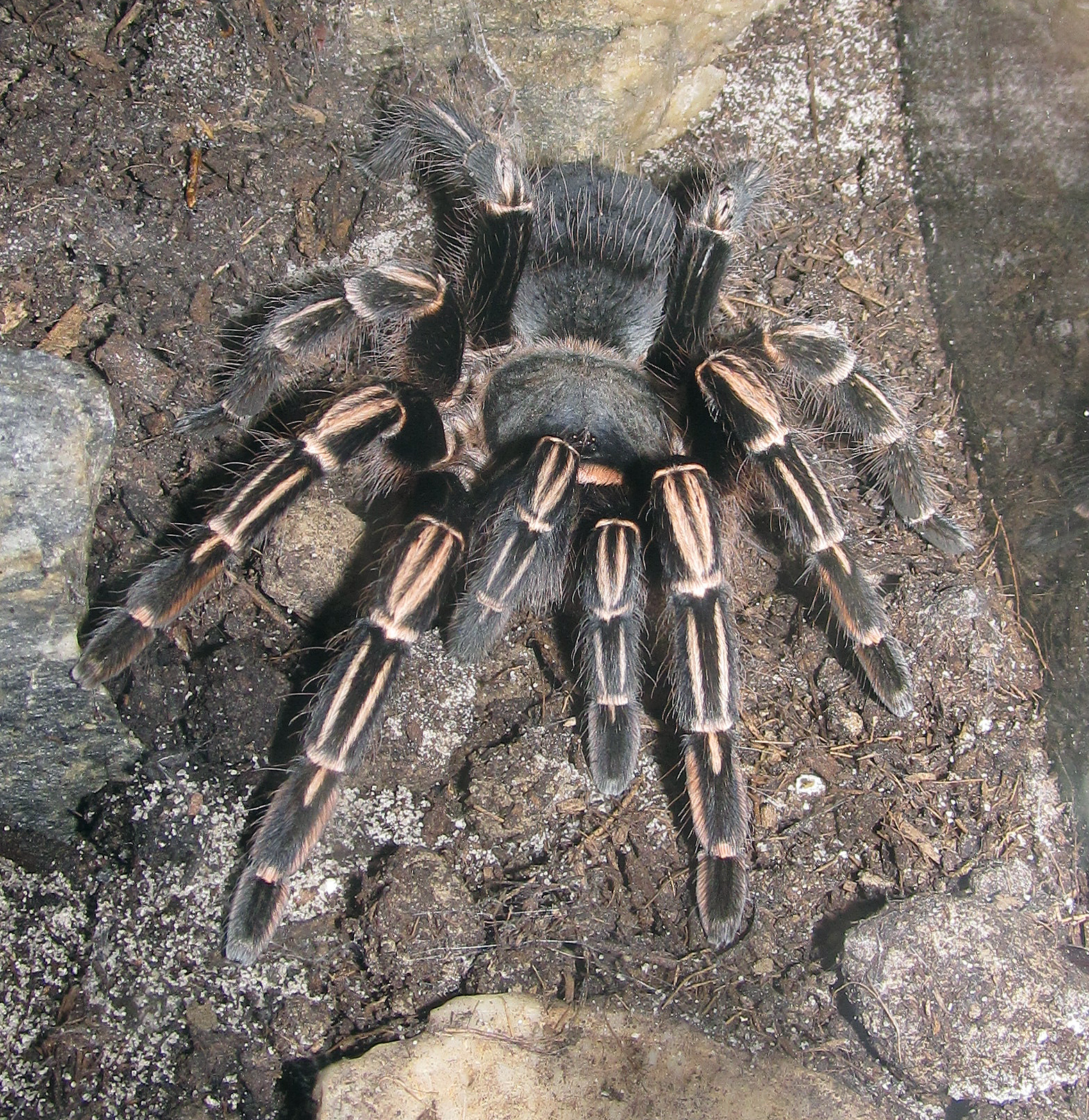
- Female Aphonopelma seemanni

Scientific classification
- Kingdom: Animalia
- Phylum: Arthropoda
- Subphylum: Chelicerata
- Class: Arachnida
- Order: Araneae
- Infraorder: Mygalomorphae
- Family: Theraphosidae
- Genus: Aphonopelma; Pocock, 1901

Type species
- Eurypelma seemanni F. O. P.-Cambridge, 1897

Species
- See text.

Diversity
- 54

Synonyms
- Apachepelma Smith, 1995; Chaunopelma Chamberlin, 1940; Delopelma Petrunkevitch, 1939; Dugesiella Pocock, 1901; Gosipelma Chamberlin, 1940; Rhechostica Simon, 1892

= Aphonopelma =

Genus of spiders

Aphonopelma is a genus of tarantulas native to the Americas. It includes nearly all the North American tarantula species north of Mexico and a considerable percentage of the tarantula species that range into Central America. Most are fairly large tarantulas with leg spans of 6 in (16 cm) or more. Like most New World tarantulas, all species of Aphonopelma have urticating hairs. Despite their fearsome appearance, these tarantulas are not harmful to humans and some species are popular in the pet trade. With about 90 species described so far, Aphonopelma comprises about 10% of the total number of described tarantula species. However, their taxonomy is poorly understood and species are difficult to tell apart, especially those that are brown or black without other pattern. Therefore, the actual number of species is unknown, with more species likely to be identified in the near future. In captivity, they are usually fed crickets; in the wild, they eat most insects, including crickets, grasshoppers, cockroaches, mantises, and beetles.

== Taxonomy ==
The genus has a complicated taxonomic history. It was erected in 1901 by Reginald I. Pocock, when he split up Eurypelma (now Avicularia), with the type species Eurypelma seemanni. Pocock also separated off the genus Dugesiella. Two more new genera were later distinguished from Aphonopelma: Delopelma by Alexander Petrunkevitch in 1939 and Chaunopelma by Joseph C. Chamberlin in 1940. In 1985, Robert J. Raven reviewed mygalomorph genera and considered the differences among all these genera to be insignificant. He synonymized them under the name Rhechostica, which had been published by Eugène Simon in 1892, so had priority. Since the name Aphonopelma was much better known than Rechostica, the International Commission on Zoological Nomenclature in 1991 agreed to give Aphonopelma precedence over Rhechostica. In 1995, Smith erected the genus Apachepelma for the species A. paloma; in 1997, Prentice transferred it back to Aphonopelma.

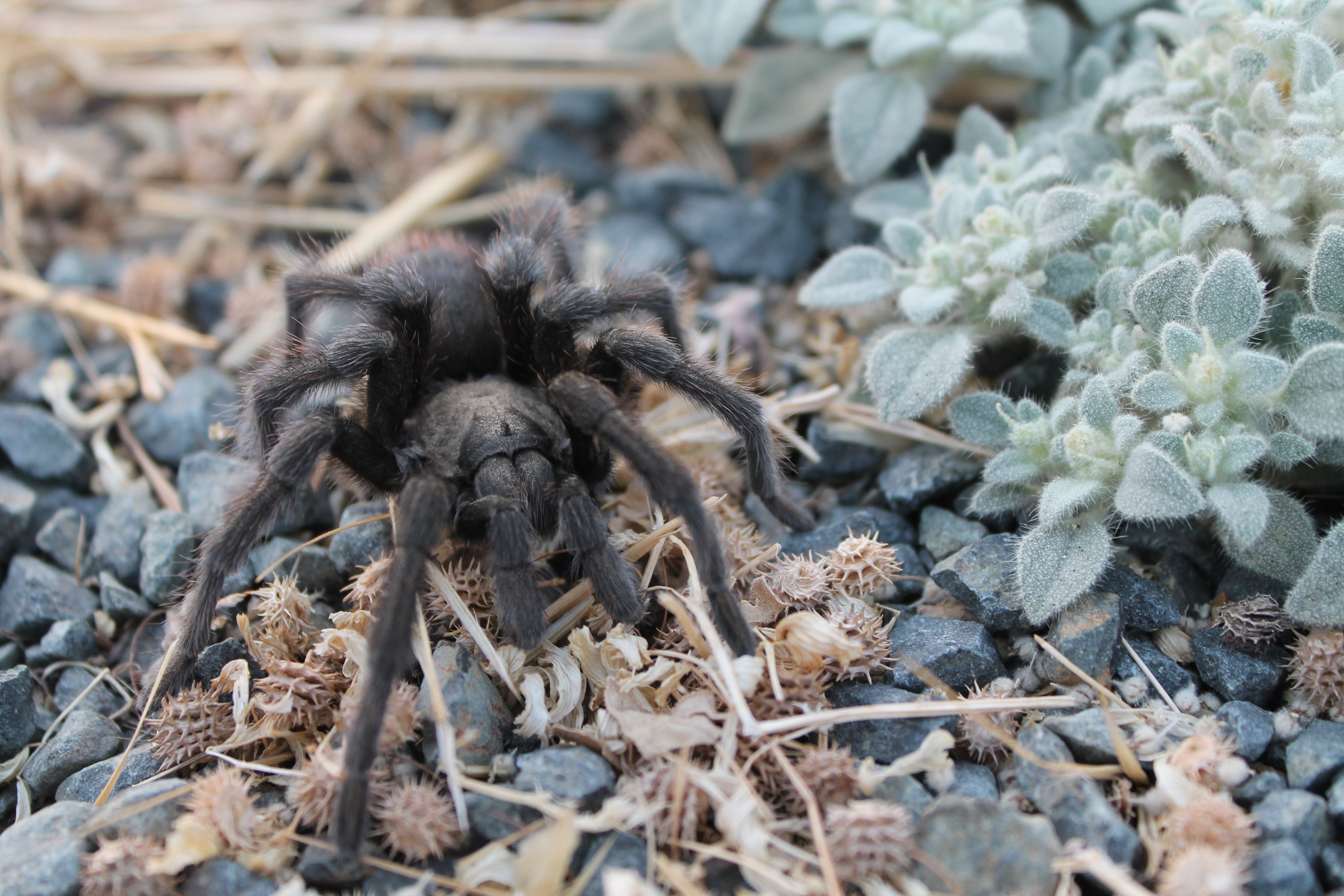
California ebony tarantula (Aphonopelma eutylenum) wandering near Exeter, CA

=== Phylogeny ===
Molecular phylogenetic studies suggest that the genus is not monophyletic. Two groups of species are apparent: one from Central America, including the type species A. seemanni from Costa Rica, and another made up of species found in the United States. The relationship between the two groups and the genus Sericopelma is shown in the cladogram below. With further research, a new genus may be needed for the American group of species.

- - Aphonopelma species from Central America
  - - Aphonopelma species from the US
    - Sericopelma

=== Species ===
As of January 2023, the World Spider Catalog accepted 54 species. A monograph of the genus within the United States, published in 2016, made some major revisions. Only 15 of the original 55 U.S. species were fully accepted, 33 were reduced to synonyms, and seven to nomina dubia (doubtful names). A further 14 new U.S. species were then described.

- Aphonopelma anax (Chamberlin, 1940) – United States, Mexico
- Aphonopelma armada (Chamberlin, 1940) – United States
- Aphonopelma atomicum Hamilton, 2016 – United States
- Aphonopelma bacadehuachi Hendrixson, 2019 – Mexico
- Aphonopelma belindae Gabriel, 2011 – Panama

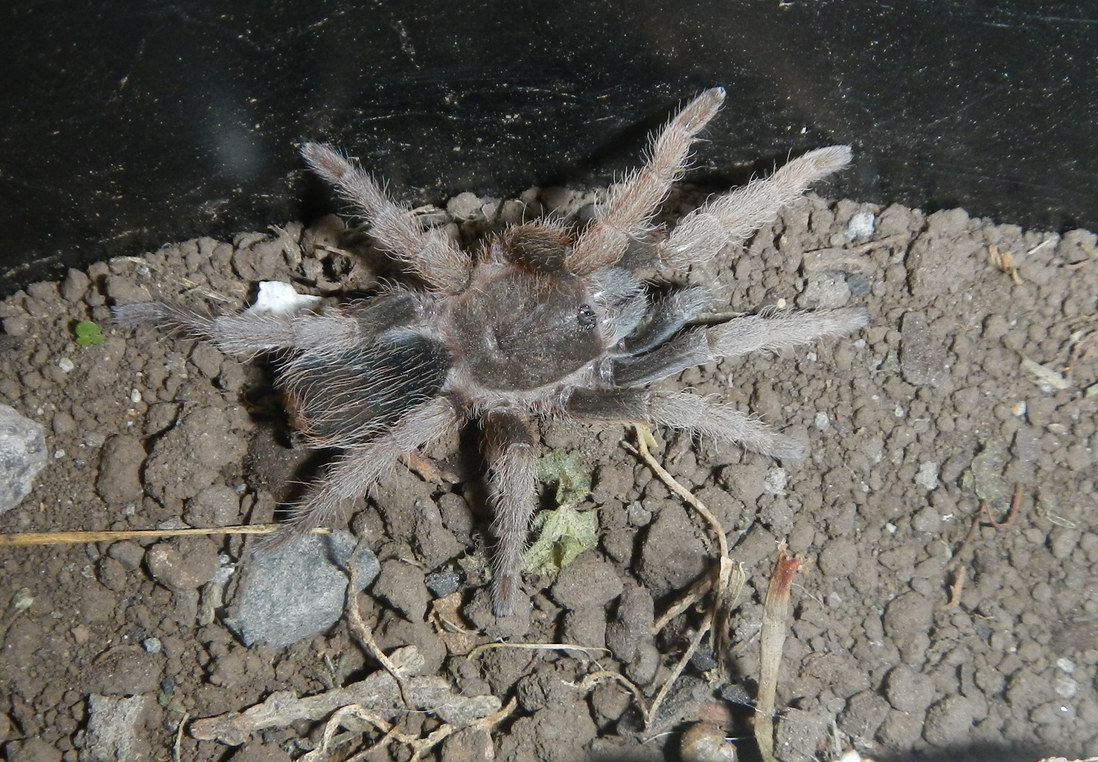
A. belindae

- Aphonopelma bicoloratum Struchen, Brändle & Schmidt, 1996 – Mexico
- Aphonopelma burica Valerio, 1980 – Costa Rica
- Aphonopelma caniceps (Simon, 1891) – Mexico
- Aphonopelma catalina Hamilton, Hendrixson & Bond, 2016 – United States
- Aphonopelma chalcodes Chamberlin, 1940 – United States
- Aphonopelma chiricahua Hamilton, Hendrixson & Bond, 2016 – United States
- Aphonopelma cookei Smith, 1995 – Mexico
- Aphonopelma crinirufum (Valerio, 1980) – Costa Rica

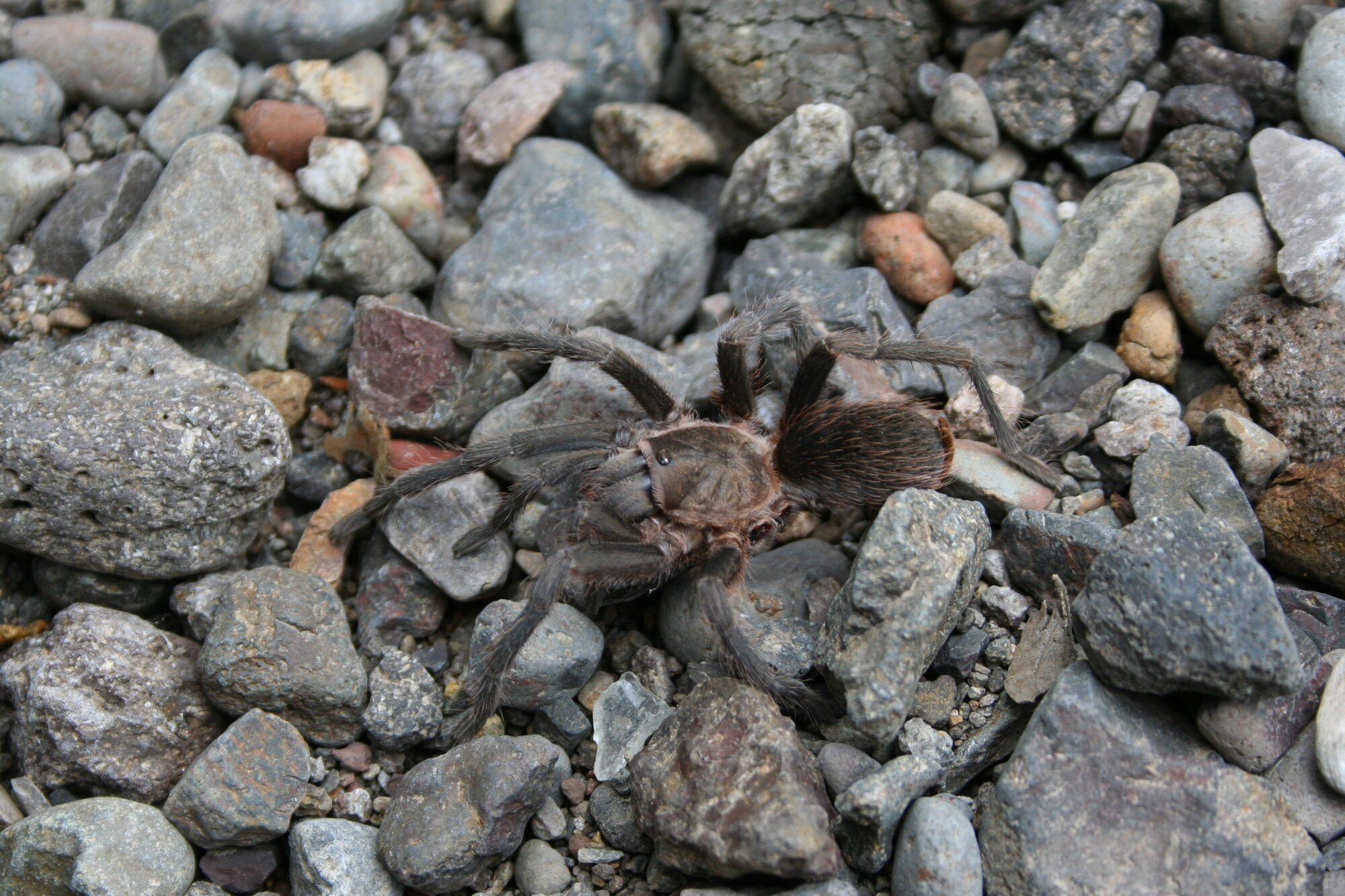
A. crinirufum

- Aphonopelma eustathes (Chamberlin, 1940) – Mexico
- Aphonopelma eutylenum Chamberlin, 1940 – United States
- Aphonopelma gabeli Smith, 1995 – United States
- Aphonopelma geotoma (Chamberlin, 1937) – Mexico
- Aphonopelma gertschi Smith, 1995 – Mexico
- Aphonopelma griseum Chamberlin, 1940 – Mexico
- Aphonopelma hageni (Strand, 1906) – Mexico
- Aphonopelma helluo (Simon, 1891) – Mexico
- Aphonopelma hentzi (Girard, 1852) – United States
- Aphonopelma hesperum (Chamberlin, 1917) – Mexico
- Aphonopelma icenoglei Hamilton, Hendrixson & Bond, 2016 – United States
- Aphonopelma iodius (Chamberlin & Ivie, 1939) – United States
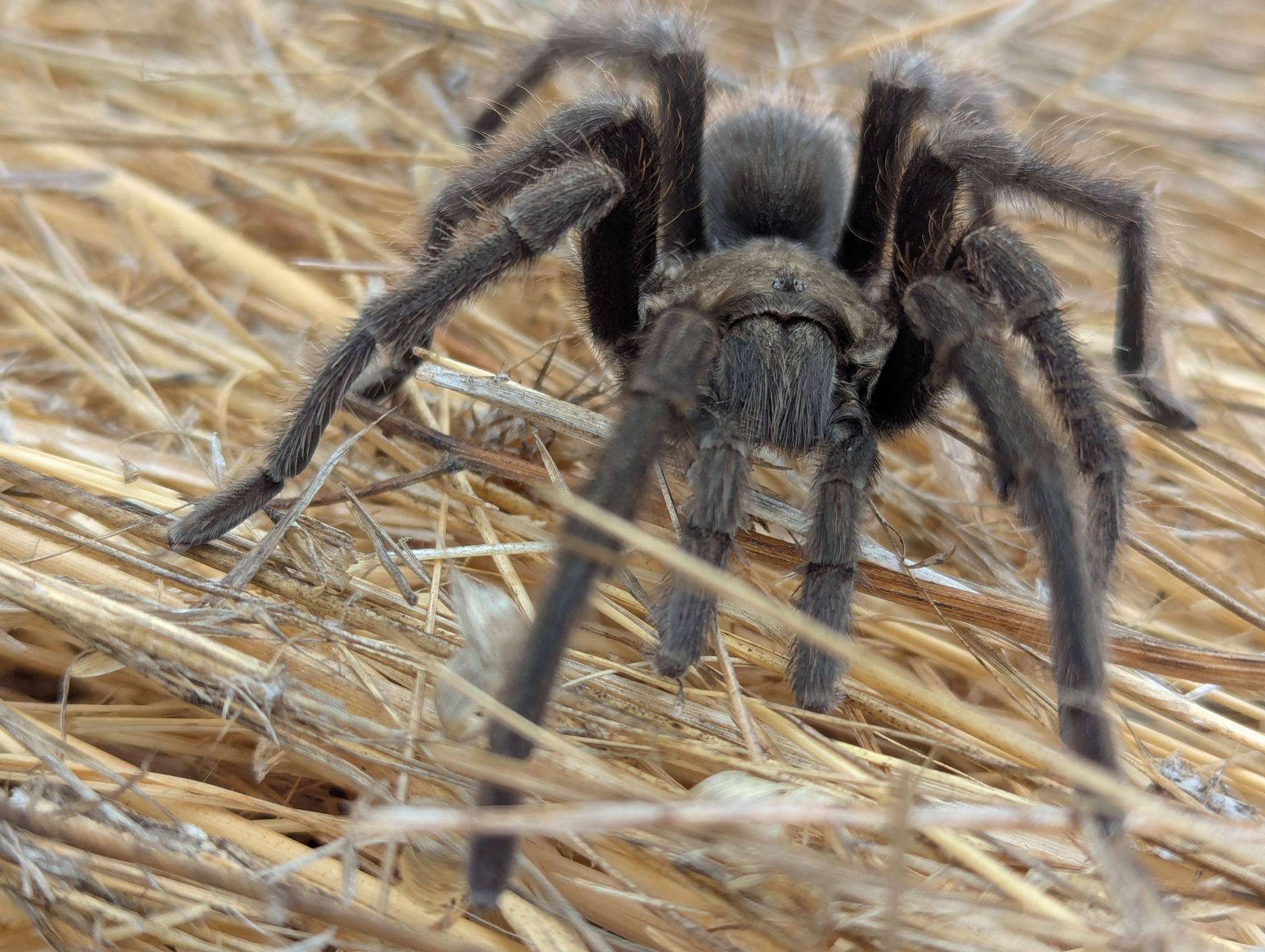
  A. iodius
- Aphonopelma johnnycashi Hamilton, 2016 – United States
- Aphonopelma joshua Prentice, 1997 – United States
- Aphonopelma levii Smith, 1995 – Mexico
- Aphonopelma madera Hamilton, Hendrixson & Bond, 2016 – United States
- Aphonopelma mareki Hamilton, Hendrixson & Bond, 2016 – United States
- Aphonopelma marxi (Simon, 1891) – United States
- Aphonopelma moderatum (Chamberlin & Ivie, 1939) – United States
- Aphonopelma moellendorfi Hamilton, 2016 – United States
- Aphonopelma mojave Prentice, 1997 – United States
- Aphonopelma mooreae Smith, 1995 – Mexico
- Aphonopelma nayaritum Chamberlin, 1940 – Mexico
- Aphonopelma pallidum (F. O. Pickard-Cambridge, 1897) – Mexico
- Aphonopelma paloma Prentice, 1993 – United States
- Aphonopelma parvum Hamilton, Hendrixson & Bond, 2016 – United States
- Aphonopelma peloncillo Hamilton, Hendrixson & Bond, 2016 – United States
- Aphonopelma phasmus Chamberlin, 1940 – United States
- Aphonopelma platnicki Smith, 1995 – Mexico
- Aphonopelma prenticei Hamilton, Hendrixson & Bond, 2016 – United States
- Aphonopelma prosoicum Chamberlin, 1940 – Mexico
- Aphonopelma ruedanum Chamberlin, 1940 – Mexico
- Aphonopelma saguaro Hamilton, 2016 – United States
- Aphonopelma sclerothrix (Valerio, 1980) – Costa Rica
- Aphonopelma seemanni (F. O. Pickard-Cambridge, 1897) (type species) – Central America
- Aphonopelma steindachneri (Ausserer, 1875) – United States
- Aphonopelma superstitionense Hamilton, Hendrixson & Bond, 2016 – United States
- Aphonopelma truncatum (F. O. Pickard-Cambridge, 1897) – Mexico
- Aphonopelma vorhiesi (Chamberlin & Ivie, 1939) – United States
- Aphonopelma xanthochromum (Valerio, 1980) – Costa Rica
- Aphonopelma xwalxwal Hamilton, 2016 – United States
- Aphonopelma anitahoffmannae Locht, Medina, Rojo & Vázquez, 2005
- Aphonopelma latens (Chamberlin, 1917)
- Aphonopelma crinitum (Pocock, 1901)
- Aphonopelma duplex (Chamberlin, 1925)

==== In synonymy ====
- Aphonopelma angusiChamberlin, 1940 → Aphonopelma iodius
- Aphonopelma apacheum Chamberlin, 1940 → Aphonopelma chalcodes
- Aphonopelma arnoldi Smith, 1995 → Aphonopelma armada
- Aphonopelma behlei Chamberlin, 1940 → Aphonopelma marxi
- Aphonopelma breenei Smith, 1995 → Aphonopelma anax
- Aphonopelma brunnius Chamberlin, 1940 → Aphonopelma iodius
- Aphonopelma chamberlini Smith, 1995 → Aphonopelma iodius
- Aphonopelma chambersi Smith, 1995 → Aphonopelma eutylenum
- Aphonopelma clarki Smith, 1995 → Aphonopelma hentzi
- Aphonopelma clarum Chamberlin, 1940 → Aphonopelma eutylenum
- Aphonopelma coloradanum Chamberlin, 1940 → Aphonopelma hentzi
- Aphonopelma cryptethum Chamberlin, 1940 → Aphonopelma eutylenum
- Aphonopelma echinum Chamberlin, 1940 → Aphonopelma hentzi
- Aphonopelma gurleyi Smith, 1995 → Aphonopelma hentzi
- Aphonopelma harlingenum Chamberlin, 1940 → Aphonopelma hentzi
- Aphonopelma heterops Chamberlin, 1940 → Aphonopelma moderatum
- Aphonopelma iviei Smith, 1995 → Aphonopelma iodius
- Aphonopelma jungi Smith, 1995 → Aphonopelma vorhiesi
- Aphonopelma lithodomum Chamberlin, 1940 → Aphonopelma iodius
- Aphonopelma melanius Chamberlin & lvie, 1939→ Aphonopelma iodius
- Aphonopelma minchi Smith, 1995 → Aphonopelma chalcodes
- Aphonopelma nevadanum Chamberlin, 1940 → Aphonopelma iodius
- Aphonopelma odelli Smith, 1995 → Aphonopelma hentzi
- Aphonopelma phanum Chamberlin, 1940 → Aphonopelma steindachneri
- Aphonopelma punzoi Smith, 1995 → Aphonopelma vorhiesi
- Aphonopelma reversum Chamberlin, 1940 → Aphonopelma steindachneri
- Aphonopelma rothi Smith, 1995 → Aphonopelma chalcodes
- Aphonopelma sandersoni Smith, 1995 → Aphonopelma eutylenum
- Aphonopelma schmidti Smith, 1995 → Aphonopelma chalcodes
- Aphonopelma simulatum Chamberlin & Ivie, 1939 → Aphonopelma marxi
- Aphonopelma smithi Smith, 1995 → Aphonopelma iodius
- Aphonopelma stahnkei Smith, 1995 → Aphonopelma chalcodes
- Aphonopelma sullivani Smith, 1995 → Aphonopelma eutylenum
- Aphonopelma vogelae Smith, 1995 → Aphonopelma marxi
- Aphonopelma waconum Chamberlin, 1940 → Aphonopelma hentzi
- Aphonopelma wichitanum Chamberlin, 1940 → Aphonopelma hentzi
- Aphonopelma zionis Chamberlin, 1940 → Aphonopelma iodius

==== Nomina dubia ====
- Aphonopelma aberrans Chamberlin, 1917 - Chile
- Aphonopelma baergi Chamberlin, 1940 - United States
- Aphonopelma braunshausenii Tesmoingt, 1996 -Mexico
- Aphonopelma californicum Doleschall, in Ausserer, 1871 – United States
- Aphonopelma cratium Chamberlin, 1940 – United States
- Aphonopelma hollyi Smith, 1995 – United States
- Aphonopelma lamperti Strand, 1907 - unknown locality
- Aphonopelma leiogaster Doleschall, in Ausserer, 1871 - United States
- Aphonopelma mordax Ausserer, 1871 - United States
- Aphonopelma orthonops Chamberlin, 1940 – United States
- Aphonopelma pedatum Strand, 1907 – Suriname
- Aphonopelma pseudoroseum Strand, 1907 – United States
- Aphonopelma radinum Chamberlin & Ivie 1939 – United States
- Aphonopelma rileyi Marx, 1888 – United States
- Aphonopelma rubropilosum Ausserer, 1871 – Brazil
- Aphonopelma rusticum Simon, 1891 - Mexico
- Aphonopelma sericeum Ausserer, 1875 - Mexico
- Aphonopelma texense Simon, 1891 – United States
- Aphonopelma anitahoffmannae Locht, Medina, Rojo & Vázquez, 2005
- Aphonopelma duplex (Chamberlin, 1925)
- Aphonopelma serratum (Simon, 1891)

==== Species transferred to other genera ====
- Aphonopelma albiceps (Pocock, 1903) → Brachypelma albiceps
- Aphonopelma balboanum Chamberlin, 1940 → Sericopelma rubronitens
- Aphonopelma bistriatum (C. L. Koch, 1838) → Ephebopus murinus
- Aphonopelma consocius Chamberlin, 1940 → Sericopelma rubronitens
- Aphonopelma dubium (Mello-Leitão, 1923 → Vitalius dubius
- Aphonopelma lanceolatum (Simon, 1891) → Sandinista lanceolatum
- Aphonopelma mendozina (Holmberg, 1876) → Avicularia mendozina (Nomen dubium)
- Aphonopelma saltator (Pocock, 1903) → Eupalaestrus weijenberghi
- Aphonopelma stoicum (Chamberlin, 1925) → Crassicrus stoicum
- Aphonopelma stygia Gertsch, 1971 → Hemirrhagus stygius
- Aphonopelma tamaulipeca (Chamberlin, 1937) → Clavopelma tamaulipeca
- Aphonopelma vellutinum (Mello-Leitão, 1923) → Vitalius vellutinus
- Aphonopelma vitiosum (Keyserling, 1891) → Pterinopelma vitiosum
- Aphonopelma wacketi (Mello-Leitão, 1923) → Vitalius wacketi
- Aphonopelma weijenberghi (Thorell, 1894) → Eupalaestrus weijenberghi

==== Species names rejected in the 2016 monograph include ====
- Aphonopelma apacheum Chamberlin, 1940 = A. chalcodes
- Aphonopelma arnoldi Smith, 1995 = A. armada
- Aphonopelma baergi Chamberlin, 1940, nom. dub.
- Aphonopelma behlei Chamberlin, 1940 = A. marxi
- Aphonopelma breenei Smith, 1995 = A. anax
- Aphonopelma brunnius Chamberlin, 1940 = A. iodius
- Aphonopelma chambersi Smith, 1995 = A. eutylenum
- Aphonopelma chamberlini Smith, 1995 = A. iodius
- Aphonopelma clarki Smith, 1995 = A. hentzi
- Aphonopelma clarum Chamberlin, 1940 = A. eutylenum
- Aphonopelma coloradanum (Chamberlin, 1940) = A. hentzi
- Aphonopelma cratium Chamberlin, 1940, nom. dub.
- Aphonopelma cryptethum Chamberlin, 1940 = A. eutylenum
- Aphonopelma echinum (Chamberlin, 1940) = A. hentzi
- Aphonopelma gurleyi Smith, 1995 = A. hentzi
- Aphonopelma harlingenum (Chamberlin, 1940) = A. hentzi
- Aphonopelma heterops Chamberlin, 1940 = A. moderatum
- Aphonopelma iviei Smith, 1995 = A. iodius
- Aphonopelma jungi Smith, 1995 = A. vorhiesi
- Aphonopelma lithodomum Chamberlin, 1940 = A. iodius
- Aphonopelma minchi Smith, 1995 = A. chalcodes
- Aphonopelma mordax (Ausserer, 1871), nom. dub.
- Aphonopelma odelli Smith, 1995 = A. hentzi
- Aphonopelma phanum Chamberlin, 1940 = A. steindachneri
- Aphonopelma punzoi Smith, 1995 = A. vorhiesi
- Aphonopelma radinum (Chamberlin & Ivie, 1939), nom. dub.
- Aphonopelma reversum Chamberlin, 1940 = A. steindachneri
- Aphonopelma rothi Smith, 1995 = A. chalcodes
- Aphonopelma rusticum (Simon, 1891), nom. dub.
- Aphonopelma sandersoni Smith, 1995 = A. eutylenum
- Aphonopelma schmidti Smith, 1995 = A. chalcodes
- Aphonopelma smithi Smith, 1995 = A. iodius
- Aphonopelma stahnkei Smith, 1995 = A. chalcodes
- Aphonopelma texense (Simon, 1891), nom. dub.
- Aphonopelma vogelae Smith, 1995 = A. marxi
- Aphonopelma waconum (Chamberlin, 1940) = A. hentzi
- Aphonopelma wichitanum (Chamberlin, 1940) = A. hentzi
- Aphonopelma zionis Chamberlin, 1940 = A. iodius
