= Pochote =

Pochote can refer to several species of trees including:

- Pachira quinata
- Ceiba aesculifolia
