= Pinktoe =

Pinktoe may refer to one of the following spiders of genus Avicularia

- Antilles pinktoe
- Goliath pinktoe
- Peruvian pinktoe
- Common pinktoe
- Yellow-banded pinktoe
