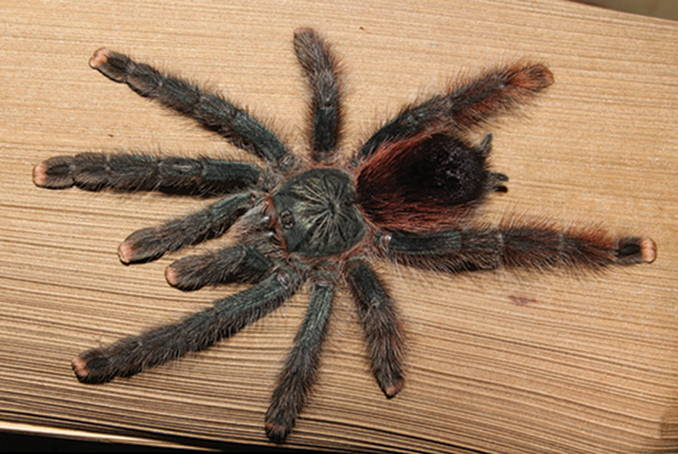
- Avicularia avicularia female

Scientific classification
- Kingdom: Animalia
- Phylum: Arthropoda
- Subphylum: Chelicerata
- Class: Arachnida
- Order: Araneae
- Infraorder: Mygalomorphae
- Family: Theraphosidae
- Genus: Avicularia; Lamarck, 1818

Type species
- Aranea avicularia (Linnaeus, 1758)

Species
- See text.

Diversity
- 12 species

Synonyms
- Avicuscodra Strand, 1908; Eurypelma C. L. Koch, 1850

= Avicularia =

Genus of spiders

Avicularia is a genus of the family Theraphosidae containing various species of arboreal tarantulas. The genus is native to Panama, the Caribbean, and tropical South America. Each species in the genus has very distinguishable pink foot pads.

Species belonging to this genus are amongst the relatively small exception of tarantulas that can jump moderate distances as juveniles, with most tarantulas being limited to lunges of 3-4 centimeters.

Urticating hairs are distinct to New World tarantulas including the Avicularia that are attached to the spider's cuticle via a stalk. These spiny, barbed hairs are used as a defense against potential intruders as well as embedded into silk to protect the egg sac. In active defense, the hairs are released by contact with the stimulus and rubbed in.

At least three species of Avicularia are threatened by habitat loss and illegal trafficking, due to their popularity as exotic pets. Avicularia avicularia are among the tarantulas most commonly kept as pets for their "stunning" color and size.

== Taxonomy ==
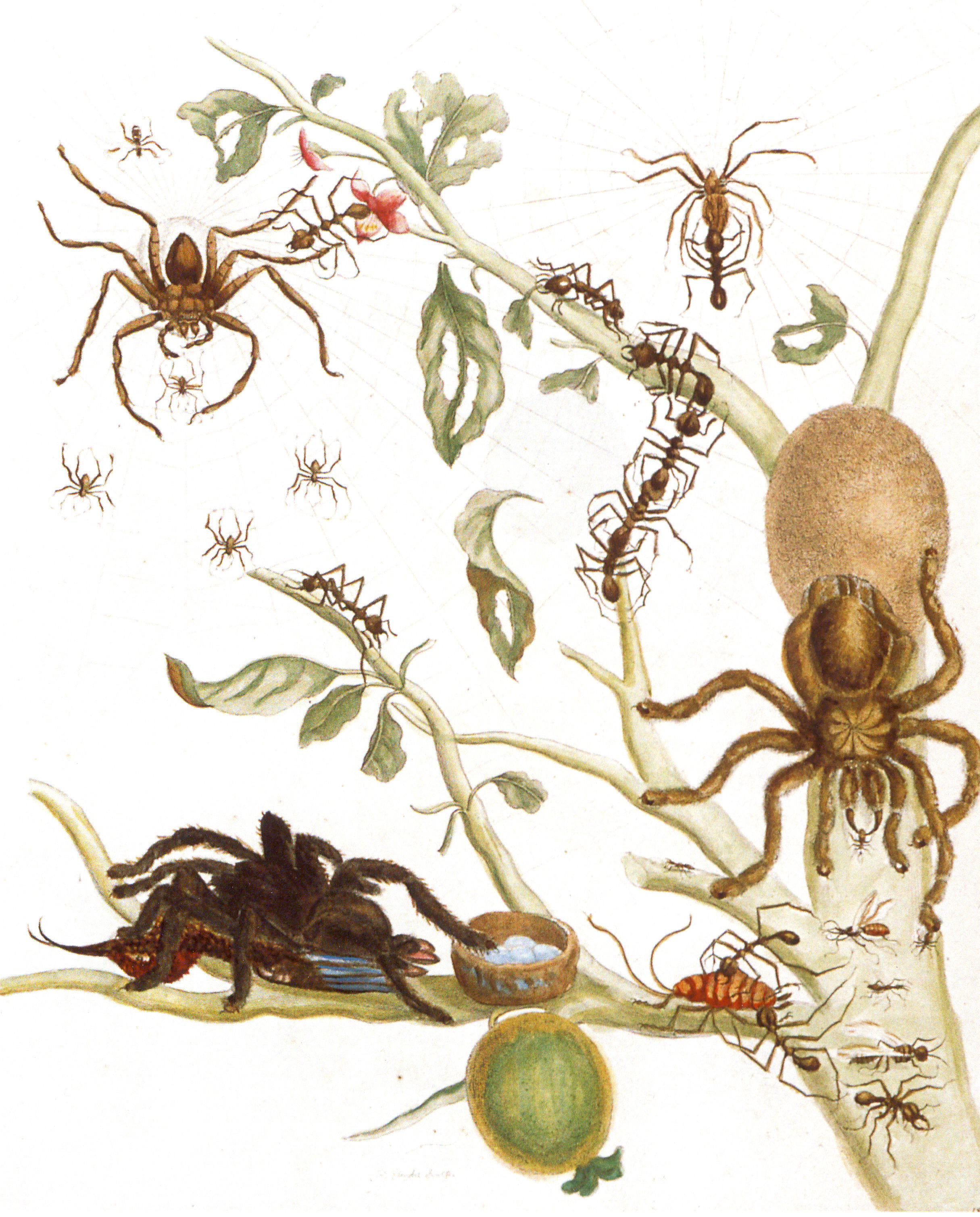
Maria Sibylla Merian's illustration of a spider eating a bird, bottom left corner. Published 1705 after a research expedition in Dutch Surinam

The genus Avicularia was erected in 1818 by Jean-Baptiste Lamarck for species previously placed in Mygale Latreille, 1802, the genus name used at the time for most mygalomorph spiders. One of the species Lamarck included in his new genus was Avicularia canceridea, which included Aranea avicularia, first described by Carl Linnaeus in 1758. Araneologists continued to use the name Mygale, although this had been used for genus of mammals in 1800, so was not available for Latreille to use for spiders. Ausserer in 1871 used Avicularia, but a degree of confusion persisted until a decision of the International Commission on Zoological Nomenclature in 1928 established the correctness of Avicularia, with the type species being Linnaeus' Aranea avicularia in the combination Avicularia avicularia.

Linnaeus' name Avicularia is derived from the Latin avicula, meaning "little bird", with the suffix -aria, which is the Latin female singular form of -arius, meaning "pertaining to." This refers to a 1705 illustration by Maria Sibylla Merian, showing a tarantula that appears to be of this genus feeding on a bird. The English names "bird spider" and "bird-eating spider," and the German name for tarantula, Vogelspinne (a compound noun literally meaning "bird" [vogel] "spider" [spinne]) reflect this Latin name. Ironically, the term "bird-eater" is more typically applied to the common names of large terrestrial species of tarantulas, such as the Goliath birdeater (Theraphosa blondi), the burgundy Goliath bird eater (Theraphosa stirmi), and the Brazilian salmon pink bird-eating tarantula (Lasiodora parahybana).

A major review of the genus drastically reduced the number of species recognized, from over 50 to 12, as of March 2017. Some species have been transferred to other genera, with others reduced to synonymy. Yet more names are considered to be doubtful in their application (nomina dubia).

=== Species ===
As of March 2017, the World Spider Catalog accepted the following species:

- Avicularia avicularia (Linnaeus, 1758) (type species) – Venezuela, Guyana, Suriname, French Guiana, Trinidad and Tobago, Brazil, Peru, Bolivia
- Avicularia caei Fukushima & Bertani, 2017 – Brazil
- Avicularia glauca Simon, 1891 – Panama
- Avicularia hirschii Bullmer, Thierer-Lutz & Schmidt, 2006 – Ecuador, Peru, Brazil
- Avicularia juruensis Mello-Leitão, 1923 – Colombia, Ecuador, Peru, Brazil
- Avicularia lynnae Fukushima & Bertani, 2017 – Peru, Ecuador
- Avicularia merianae Fukushima & Bertani, 2017 – Peru
- Avicularia minatrix Pocock, 1903 – Venezuela, Brazil
- Avicularia purpurea Kirk, 1990 – Colombia, Ecuador, Peru
- Avicularia rufa Schiapelli & Gerschman, 1945 – Ecuador, Peru, Bolivia, Brazil
- Avicularia taunayi (Mello-Leitão, 1920) – Brazil
- Avicularia variegata F. O. Pickard-Cambridge, 1896 – Venezuela, Brazil

Transferred to other genera:

- Avicularia affinis (Nicolet, 1849) → Euathlus affinis
- Avicularia aymara (Chamberlin, 1916) → Thrixopelma aymara
- Avicularia caesia (C.L. Koch, 1842) → Caribena laeta
- Avicularia diversipes (C.L. Koch, 1842) → Ybyrapora diversipes
- Avicularia dubia → Vitalius dubius
- Avicularia duplex → Aphonopelma duplex
- Avicularia embrithes → Brachypelma embrithes
- Avicularia emilia → Brachypelma emilia
- Avicularia epicureana → Brachypelma epicureanum
- Avicularia gamba Bertani & Fukushima, 2009 → Ybyrapora gamba
- Avicularia geotoma → Aphonopelma geotoma
- Avicularia guyana → Eupalaestrus guyanus
- Avicularia hageni → Aphonopelma hageni
- Avicularia helluo → Aphonopelma helluo
- Avicularia hespera → Aphonopelma hesperum
- Avicularia hirsuta (Pocock, 1901) → Iridopelma hirsutum
- Avicularia imperatrix → Plesiopelma imperatrix
- Avicularia laeta (C. L. Koch, 1842) → Caribena laeta
- Avicularia lanceolata → Aphonopelma lanceolatum
- Avicularia latens → Aphonopelma latens
- Avicularia magdalena (Karsch, 1879) → Hapalopus formosus
- Avicularia marxi → Aphonopelma marxi
- Avicularia mendozae → Grammostola mendozae
- Avicularia mesomelas → Megaphobema mesomelas
- Avicularia minax (Thorell, 1894) → Grammostola doeringi
- Avicularia muritelaria (Holmberg, 1876) → Kukulcani ahibernalis (Hentz, 1842) (Filistatidae)
- Avicularia myodes → Plesiopelma myodes
- Avicularia obscura → Ami obscura
- Avicularia pallida → Aphonopelma pallidum
- Avicularia palmicola (Mello-Leitão, 1945) → Iridopelma hirsutum
- Avicularia panamensis → Sericopelma panamense
- Avicularia parva → Catumiri parvum
- Avicularia parvior → Lasiodora parvior
- Avicularia pulchra (Mello-Leitão, 1933) and Avicularia recifiensis (Struchen & Brändle, 1996) → Pachistopelma rufonigrum
- Avicularia regina (Chamberlin, 1917) → Homoeomma strabo
- Avicularia rustica → Aphonopelma rusticum
- Avicularia rutilans Ausserer, 1875 → Caribena versicolor
- Avicularia sabulosa → Brachypelma sabulosum
- Avicularia saltator (Pocock, 1903) → Eupalaestrus weijenberghi
- Avicularia seemanni → Aphonopelma seemani
- Avicularia seladonia → Typhochlaena seladonia
- Avicularia serrata → Aphonopelma serratum
- Avicularia smithi → Brachypelma smithi
- Avicularia sooretama Bertani & Fukushima, 2009 → Ybyrapora sooretama
- Avicularia subvulpina Strand, 1906 → Grammostola subvulpina
- Avicularia spinicrus → Citharacanthus spinicrus
- Avicularia steindachneri → Aphonopelma steindachneri
- Avicularia stoica → Aphonopelma stoicum
- Avicularia tamaulipeca → Clavopelma tamaulipeca
- Avicularia tripeppi → Nhandu tripepii
- Avicularia truncata → Aphonopelma truncatum
- Avicularia vagans → Brachypelma vagans
- Avicularia vellutina → Vitalius vellutinus
- Avicularia versicolor → Caribena versicolor
- Avicularia violacea → Tapinauchenius violaceus
- Avicularia wacketi → Vitalius wacketi
- Avicularia zorodes → Iridopelma zorodes

Treated as synonyms or as nomina dubia:

- Avicularia ancylochira Mello-Leitão, 1923, synonym of A. avicularia
- Avicularia arabica (Strand, 1908), nom. dub.
- Avicularia aurantiaca Bauer, 1996, nom. dub.
- Avicularia azuraklaasi Tesmoingt, 1996, nom. dub.
- Avicularia bicegoi Mello-Leitão, 1923, synonym of A. variegata
- Avicularia braunshauseni Tesmoingt, 1999, nom. dub.
- Avicularia cuminami Mello-Leitão, 1930, synonym of A. avicularia
- Avicularia detrita (C. L. Koch, 1842), nom. dub.
- Avicularia doleschalli (Ausserer, 1871), nom. dub.
- Avicularia exilis Strand, 1907, synonym of A. avicularia
- Avicularia fasciculata Strand, 1907, nom. dub.
- Avicularia geroldi Tesmoingt, 1999, nom. dub.
- Avicularia gracilis (Keyserling, 1891) → Ischnocolus gracilis, nom. dub.
- Avicularia hirsuta (Ausserer, 1875), nom. dub.
- Avicularia holmbergi Thorell, 1890, nom. dub.
- Avicularia huriana Tesmoingt, 1996, nom. dub.
- Avicularia leporina (C. L. Koch, 1841) → Iridopelma leporina, nom. dub.
- Avicularia metallica Ausserer, 1875, nom. dub.
- Avicularia nigrotaeniata Mello-Leitão, 1940, synonym of A. avicularia
- Avicularia ochracea (Perty, 1833), nom. dub.
- Avicularia plantaris (C. L. Koch, 1842) → Iridopelma plantaris, nom. dub.
- Avicularia rapax (Ausserer, 1875), nom. dub.
- Avicularia soratae Strand, 1907, nom. dub.
- Avicularia surinamensis Strand, 1907, nom. dub.
- Avicularia ulrichea Tesmoingt, 1996, nom. dub.
- Avicularia urticans Schmidt, 1994, synonym of A. juruensis
- Avicularia velutina Simon, 1889, synonym of A. avicularia
- Avicularia walckenaeri (Perty, 1833), nom. dub.
Species

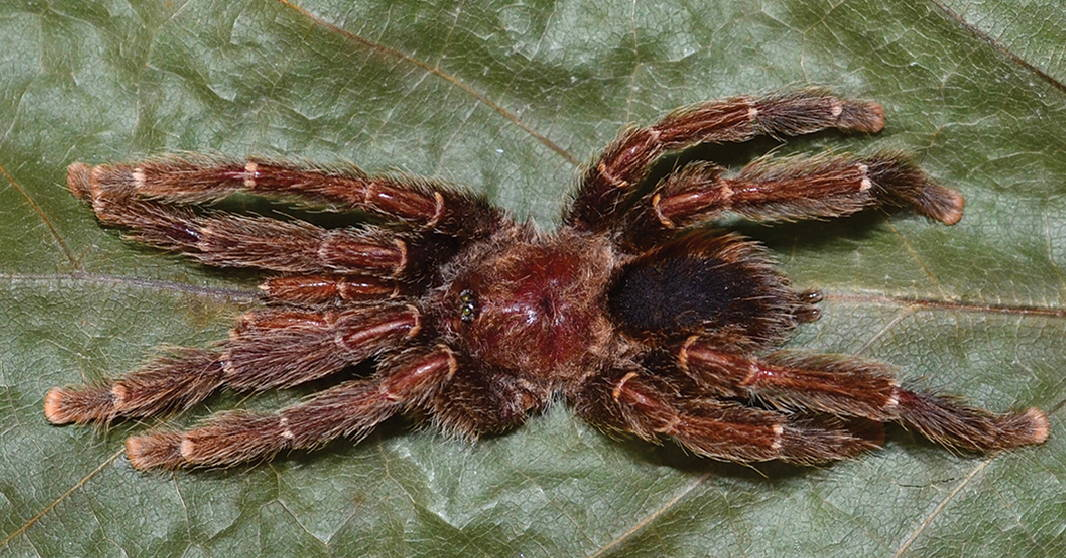
Avicularia caei male

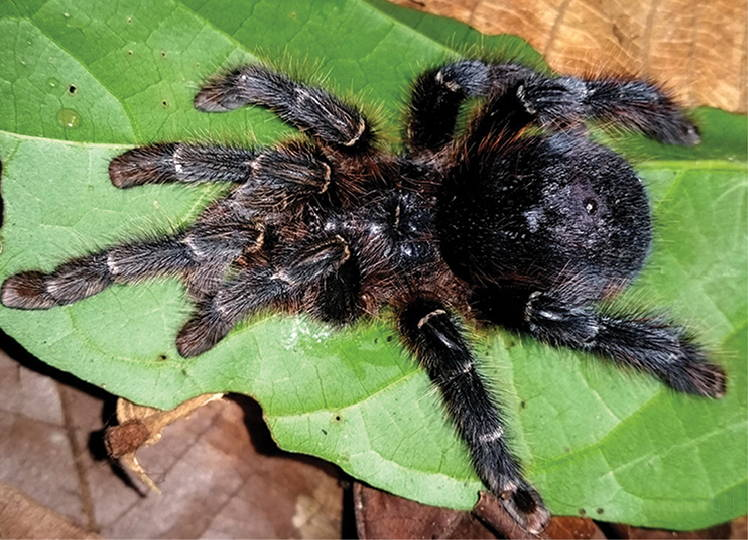
Avicularia hirschii female

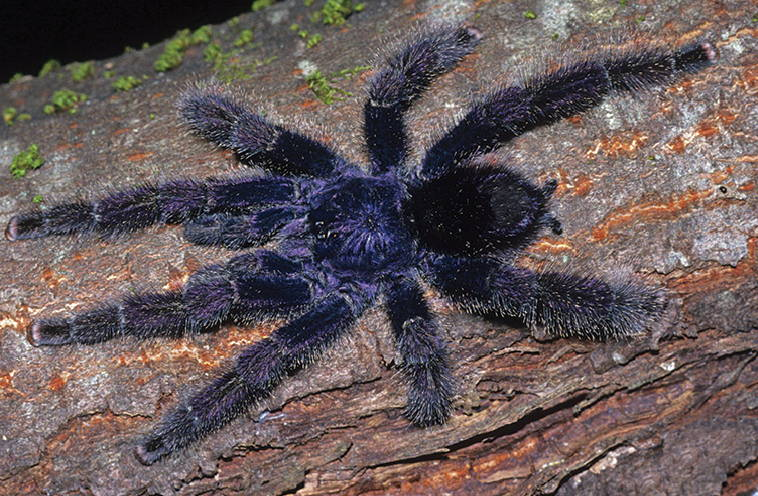
Avicularia juruensis male

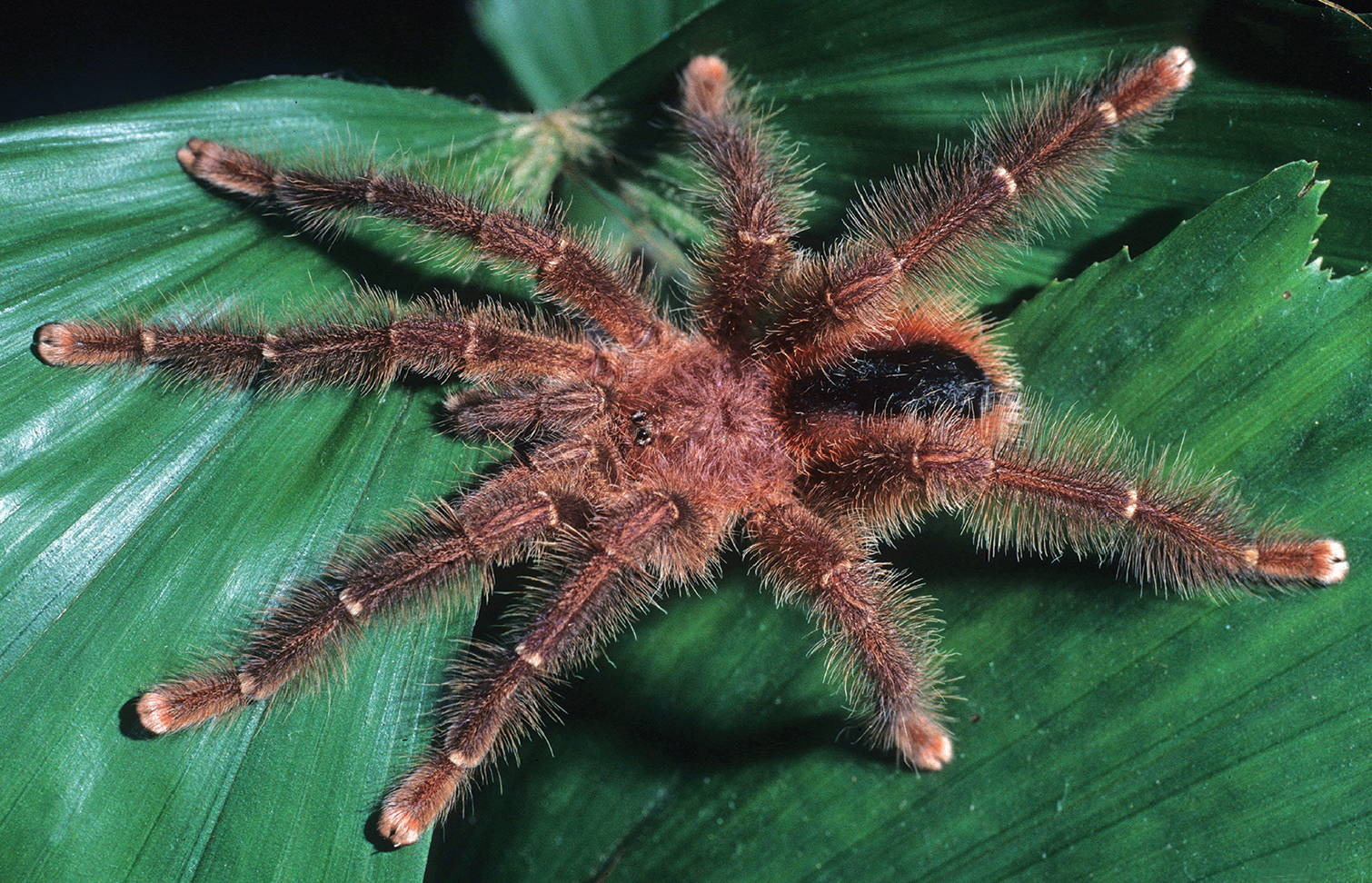
Avicularia lynnae male

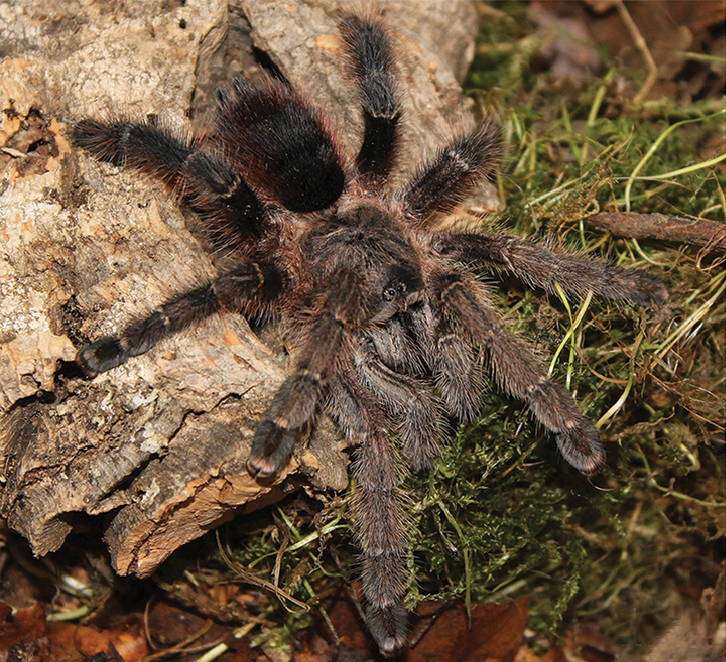
Avicularia merianae female

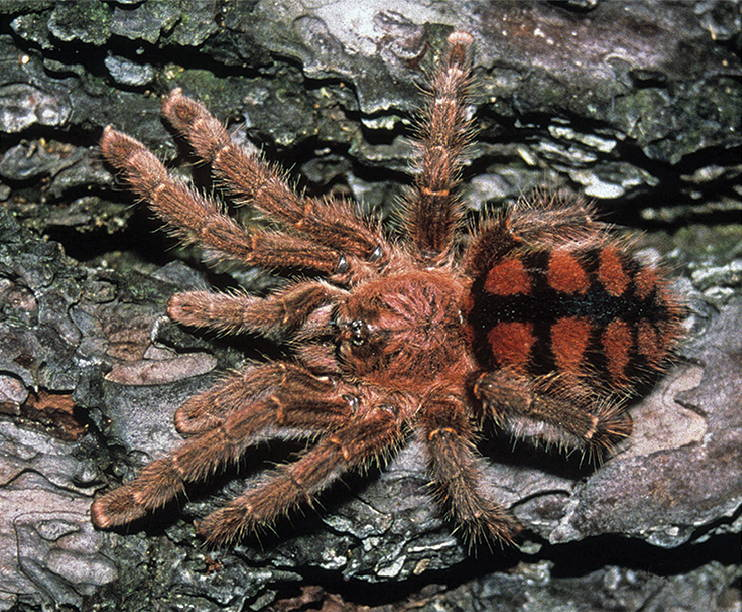
Avicularia minatrix female

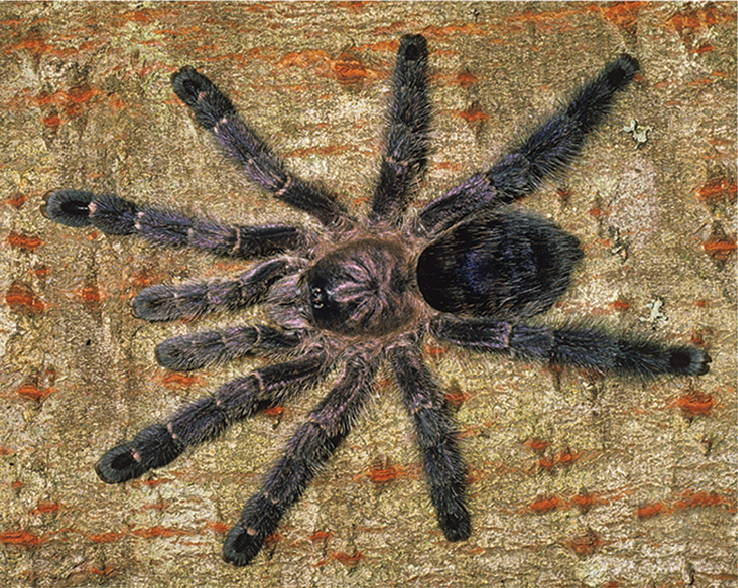
Avicularia purpurea female

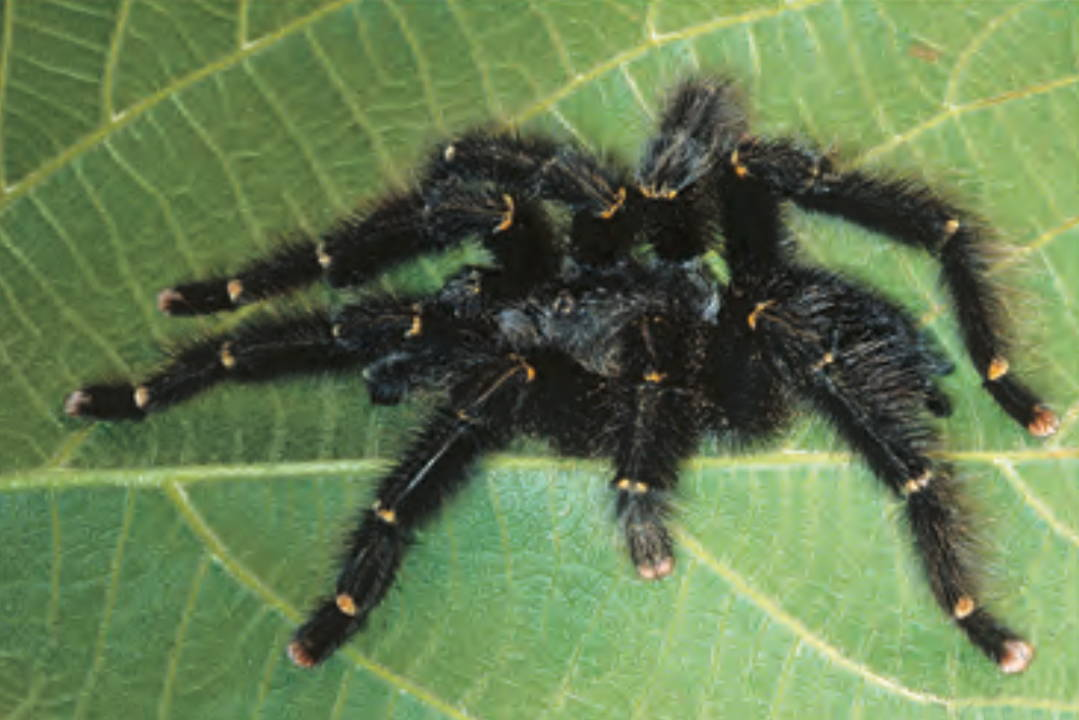
Avicularia rufa male

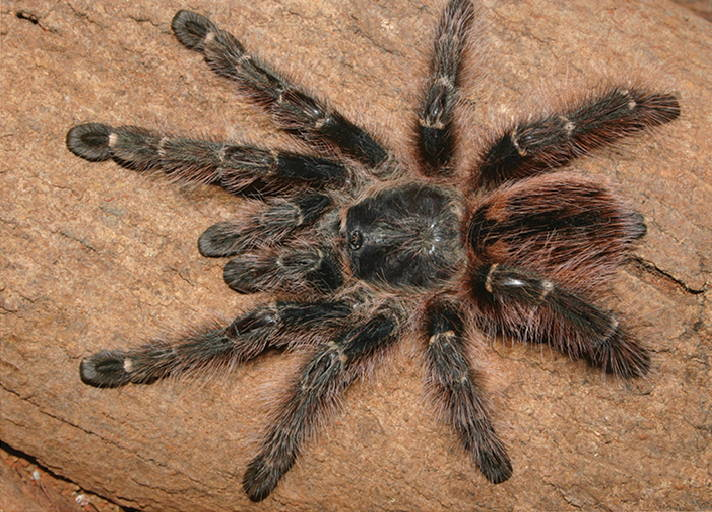
Avicularia taunayi female

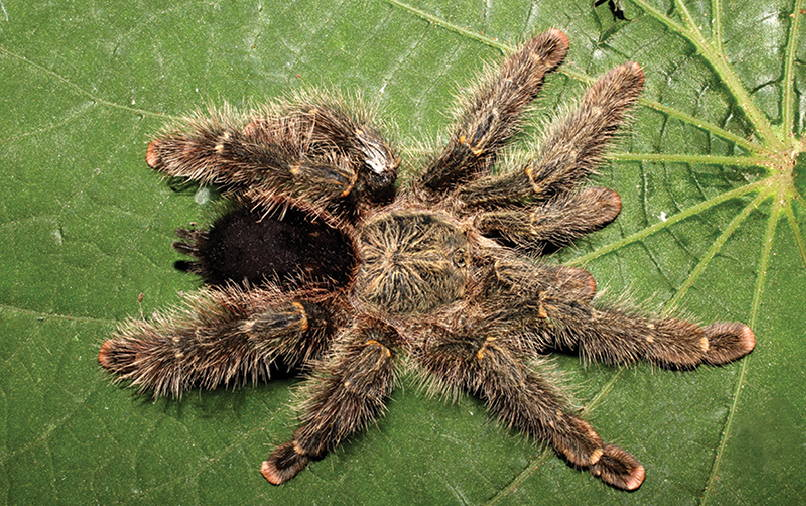
Avicularia variegata female
