= A. metallica =

A. metallica may refer to:

- Aplonis metallica, the metallic starling or shining starling, a bird species native of New Guinea and nearby Australasian islands
- Autographa metallica, the shanded gold spot, a moth species found in North-Western America
- Avicularia metallica, the metallic pinktoe, a tarantula species found in the tropical forests of Colombia

== See also ==
- Metallica (disambiguation)
