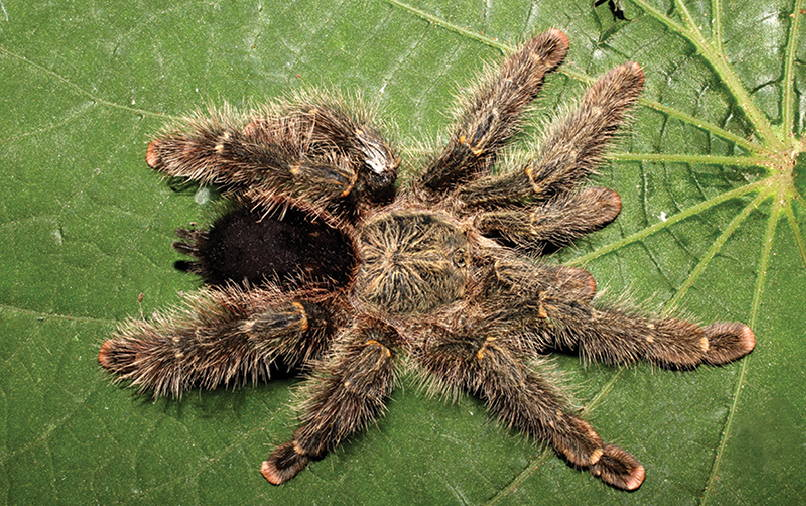
- Female, morphotype 2
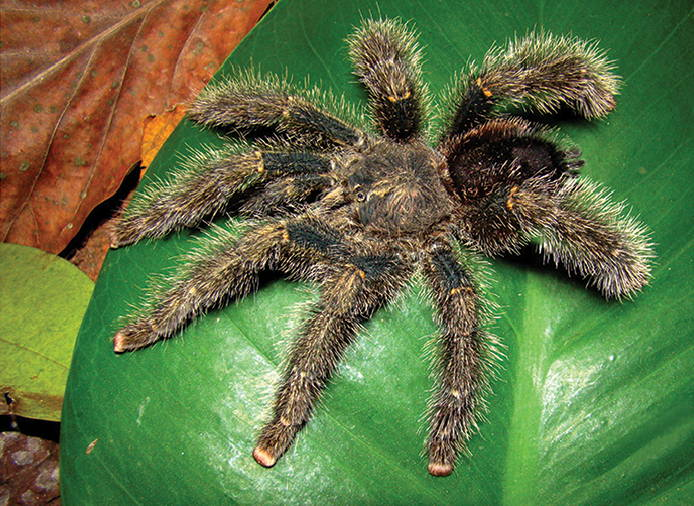
- Male, morphotype 2

Scientific classification
- Kingdom: Animalia
- Phylum: Arthropoda
- Subphylum: Chelicerata
- Class: Arachnida
- Order: Araneae
- Infraorder: Mygalomorphae
- Family: Theraphosidae
- Genus: Avicularia
- Species: A. variegata

Binomial name
- Avicularia variegata F.O. P-Cambridge, 1896

Synonyms
- Avicularia avicularia variegata F.O. P-Cambridge, 1896; Avicularia bicegoi Mello-Leitão, 1923

= Avicularia variegata =

Species of spider

Avicularia variegata is a species of spider in the family Theraphosidae found in Venezuela and Brazil. Previously described as Avicularia avicularia variegata, it is synonymous with Avicularia bicegoi.

When sold as pets, various English names have been associated with the scientific names of this species. As A. avicularia variegata, it has been called the grizzled pinktoe. As A. bicegoi, English names often refer to the red hairs on the abdomen of one colour form – Manaus brick-red rump tree spider, brick red pink toe.

== Taxonomy ==
In 1896, Frederick O. Pickard-Cambridge described spiders he had observed during an expedition to the Amazon basin as the subspecies variegata of the species Avicularia avicularia. He based the distinction on variations in colour, particularly of the leg hairs (setae), considering them insufficient to justify separation into two species. In 2017, Caroline Fukushima and Rogério Bertani made a detailed study of the genus and concluded that there were other differences that did justify specific status. Avicularia variegata has legs I and IV of more-or-less the same length, Avicularia avicularia has the fourth leg more than 10% longer than the first leg, and in the female the spermathecae of A. variegata are wider in the middle whereas those of A. avicularia are as wide in the middle as at the base. In 1923, Cândido Firmino de Mello-Leitão described Avicularia bicegoi. Fukushima and Bertani considered this to be the same species as A. variegata.

== Distribution ==
Avicularia variegata is found in Venezuela and the northern Brazilian states of Roraima, Amapá, Amazonas and Pará.
