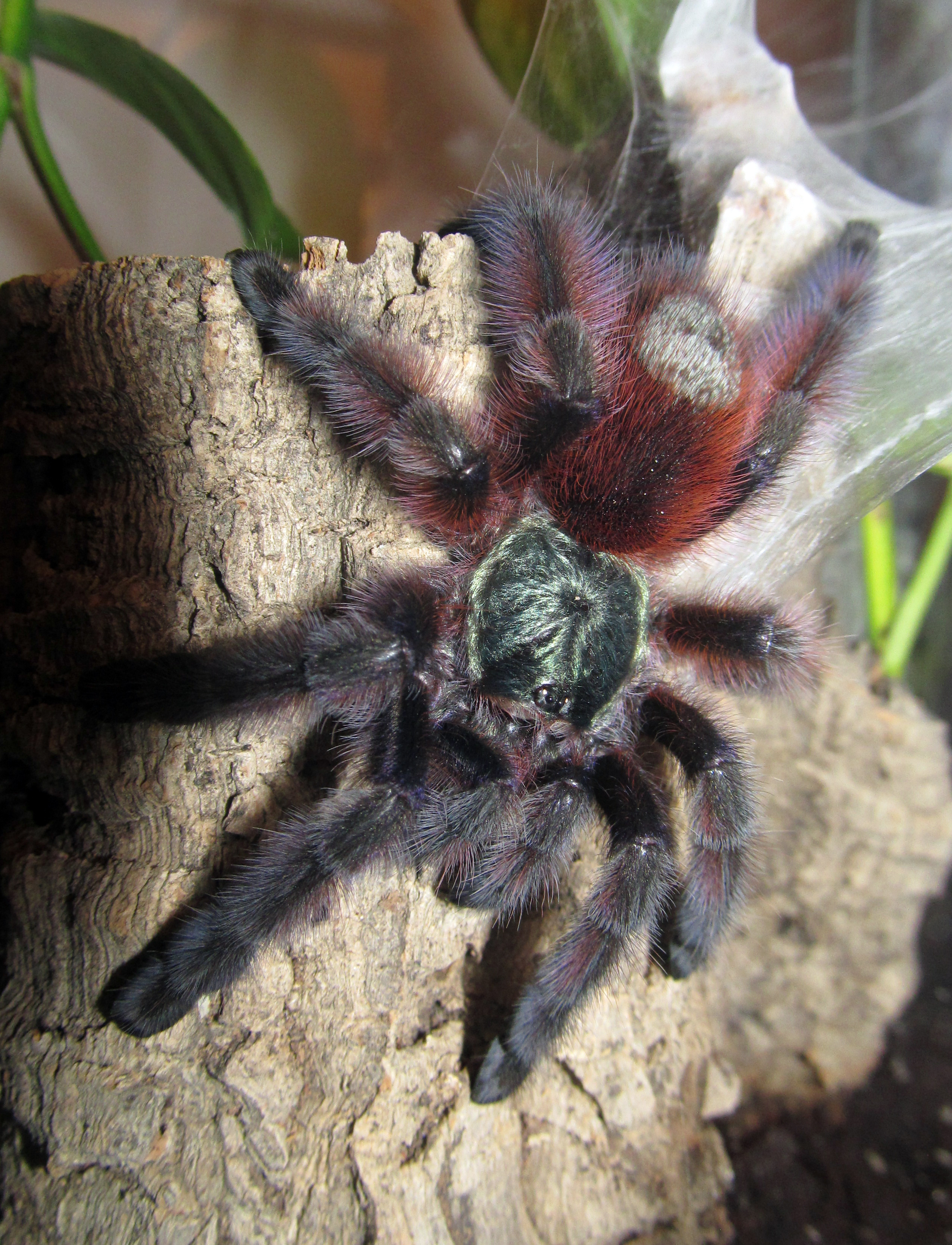
- Subadult female Caribena versicolor in captivity

Scientific classification
- Kingdom: Animalia
- Phylum: Arthropoda
- Subphylum: Chelicerata
- Class: Arachnida
- Order: Araneae
- Infraorder: Mygalomorphae
- Family: Theraphosidae
- Genus: Caribena; Fukushima & Bertani, 2017

Type species
- Caribena laeta (C. L. Koch, 1842)

Species
- 2, see text

= Caribena =

Genus of spiders

Caribena is a genus of spiders in the family Theraphosidae (tarantulas), found in the Antilles. The two species accepted as of March 2017 were formerly placed in Avicularia. Apart from a different distribution – Avicularia species are found in mainland South and Central America – Caribena is distinguished by having longer and thinner type II urticating hairs in a conspicuous patch on the upper surface of the abdomen. Males also have a differently shaped palpal bulb.

== Diagnostic ==
They own type 2 urticating hairs, which are very slender, on a clearly visible area of the opisthosoma. These hairs being longer than 1mm. And males can also be distinguished by the sharp spine like "process" in the retrolateral face of the cymbium.

== Taxonomy ==
The genus was erected in 2017 by Caroline Fukushima and Rogério Bertani for two species formerly placed in Avicularia. The genus name is derived from the Spanish word caribeña, meaning "from the Caribbean". Species of Caribena are distinguished from those of related genera by the possession of long (more than 1 mm) and very thin (less than 9 μm) type II urticating hairs carried on a conspicuous patch on the upper rear surface of the abdomen. Males have a pointed outgrowth (process) on the retrolateral lobe of the cymbium of the palpal bulb.

== Species ==
As of July 2022, the World Spider Catalog accepted the following species, both transferred from the genus Avicularia:

- Caribena laeta (C.L. Koch, 1842) – Puerto Rico, Cuba, US Virgin Islands
- Caribena versicolor (Walckenaer, 1837) – Martinique

=== In synonymy ===
- Caribena caesia (C. L. Koch, 1842) = Caribena laeta
- Caribena rutilans (Ausserer, 1875) = Caribena versicolor

=== Gallery ===
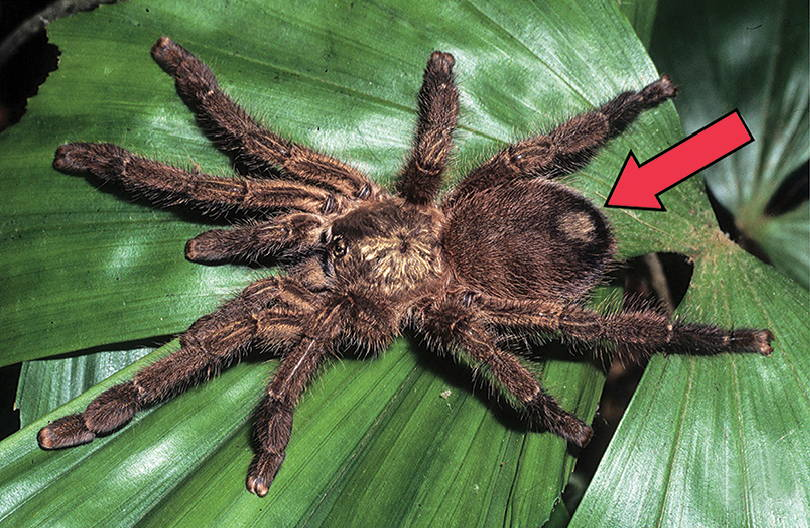
Female Caribena laeta; arrow marks urticating hairs

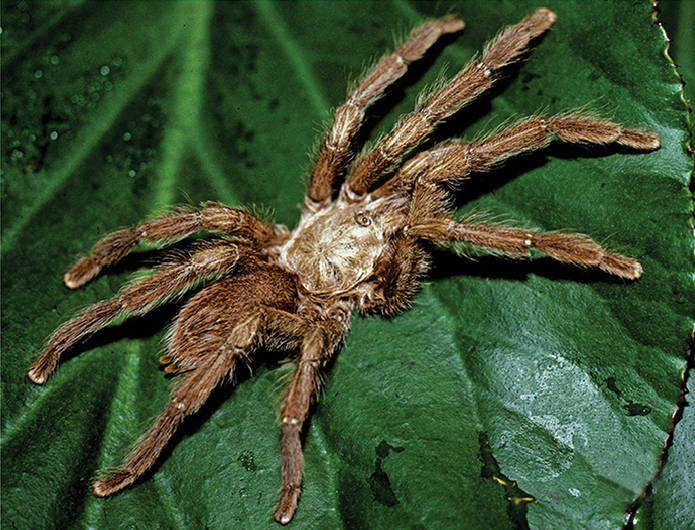
Male Caribena laeta

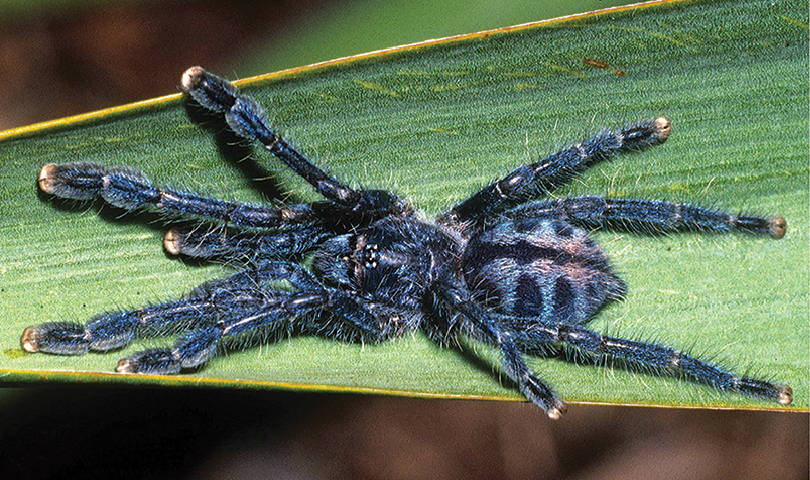
Immature Caribena laeta

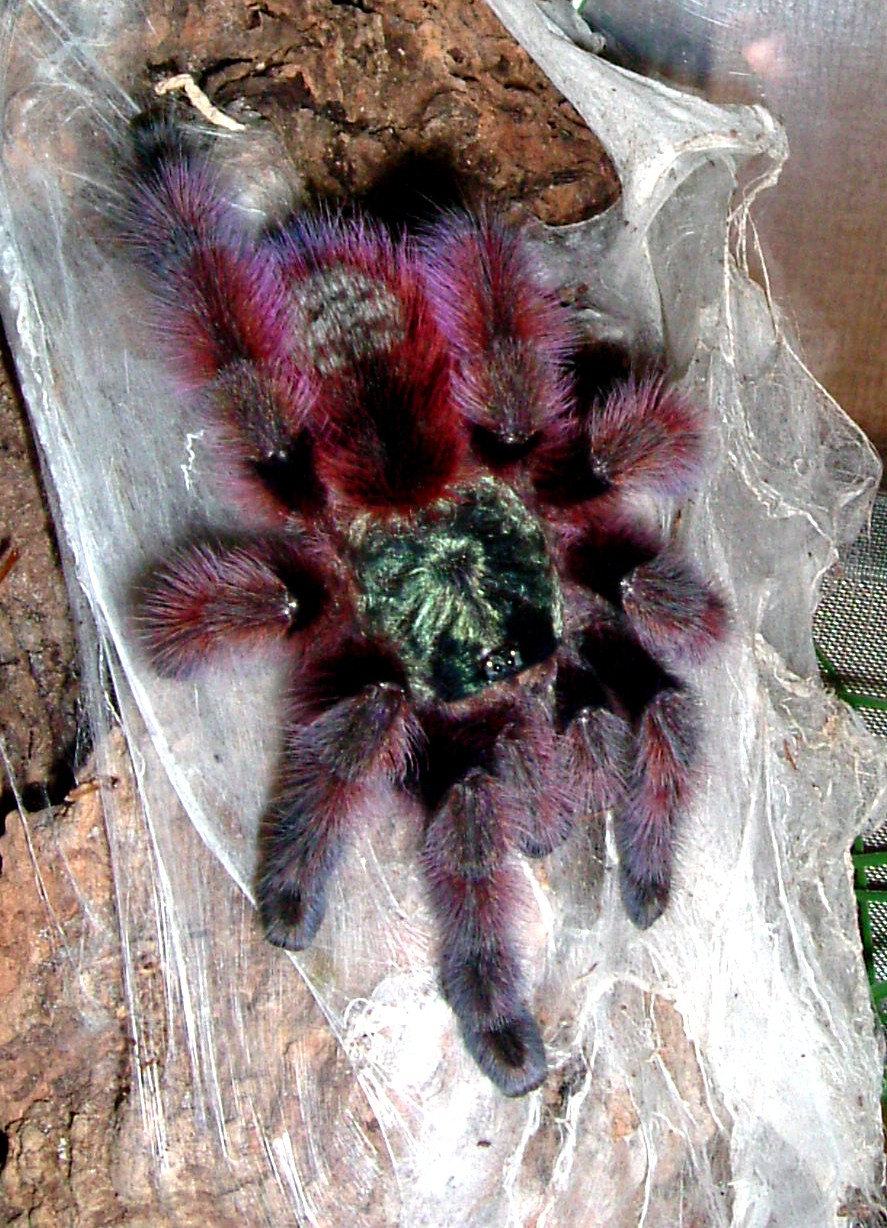
Caribena versicolor female

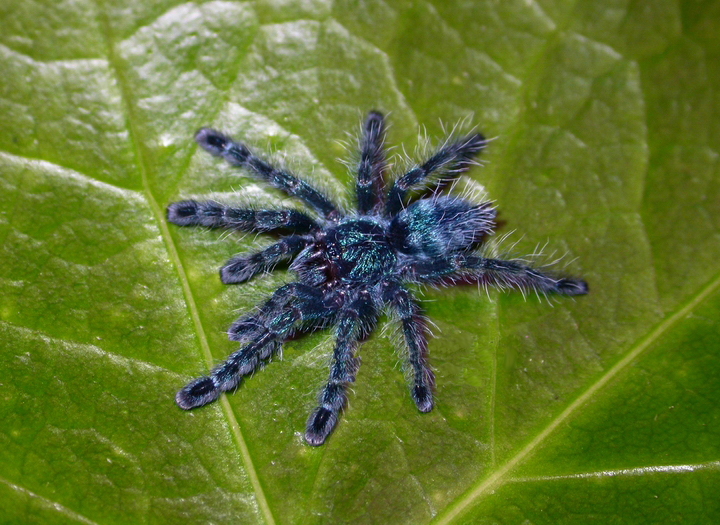
Immature Caribena versicolor
