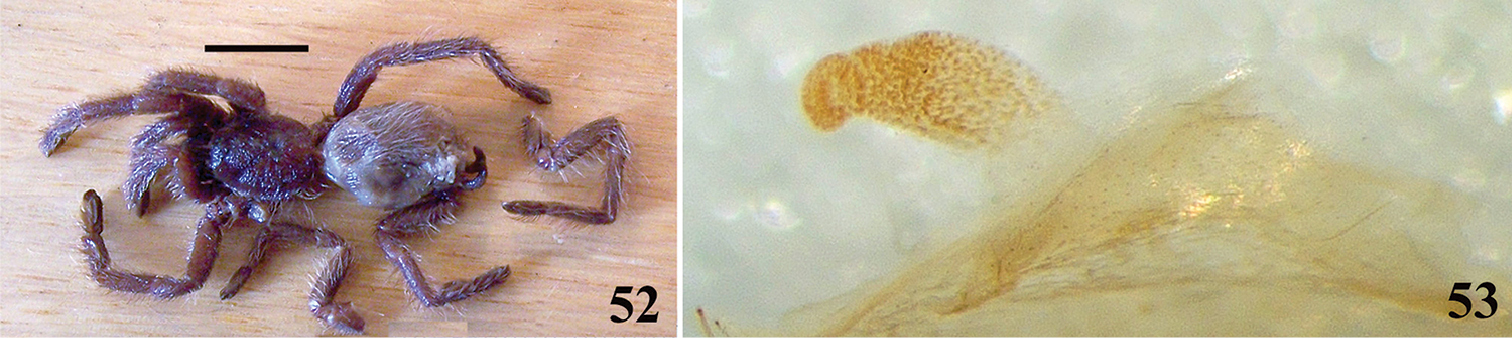

Scientific classification
- Kingdom: Animalia
- Phylum: Arthropoda
- Subphylum: Chelicerata
- Class: Arachnida
- Order: Araneae
- Infraorder: Mygalomorphae
- Family: Theraphosidae
- Genus: Avicularia
- Species: A. glauca

Binomial name
- Avicularia glauca (Simon, 1891)

= Avicularia glauca =

Species of spider

Avicularia glauca is a species of spider in the family Theraphosidae, found in Panama. The species was first described by Eugène Simon in 1891. As of March 2017, only a single female preserved specimen is known. It appears to be closely related to Avicularia purpurea. Avicularia species are rare in southern Central America; further studies are in progress.
