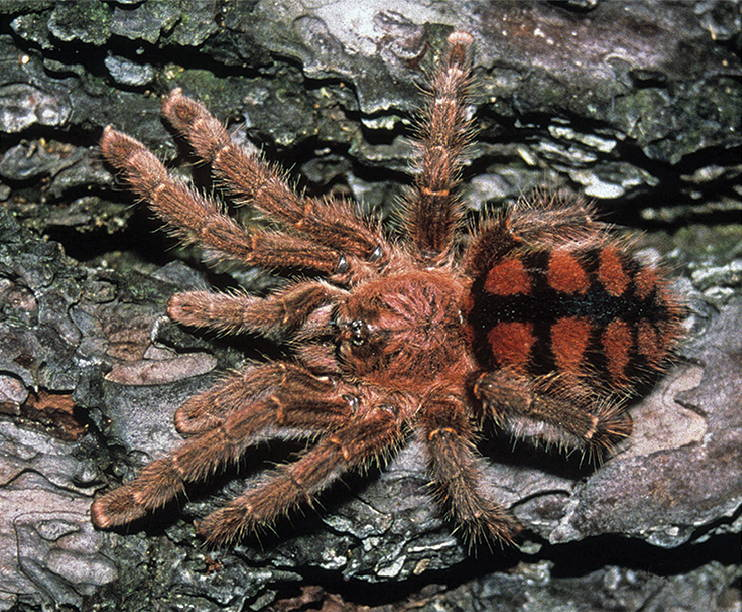
- Female
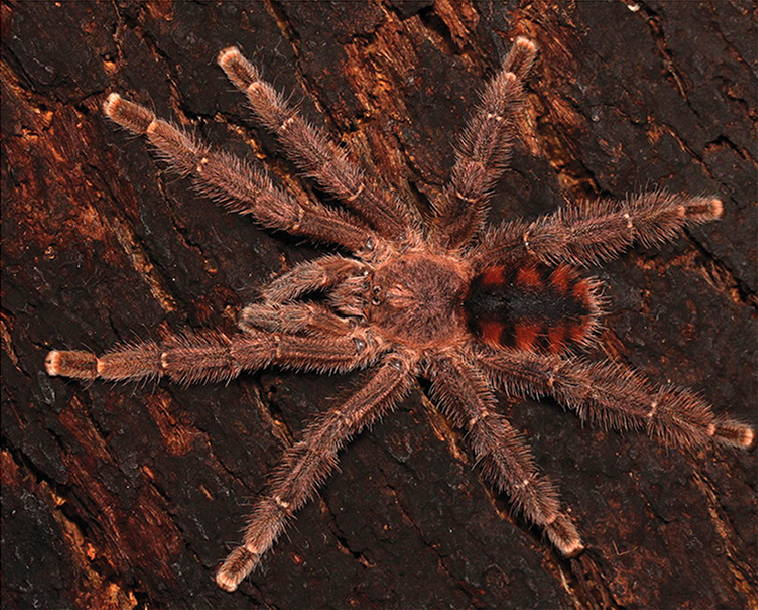
- Male

Scientific classification
- Kingdom: Animalia
- Phylum: Arthropoda
- Subphylum: Chelicerata
- Class: Arachnida
- Order: Araneae
- Infraorder: Mygalomorphae
- Family: Theraphosidae
- Genus: Avicularia
- Species: A. minatrix

Binomial name
- Avicularia minatrix Pocock, 1903

= Avicularia minatrix =

Species of spider

Avicularia minatrix also known as the Red Slate Pink Toe, Redstripe Pinktoe or Venezuelan Redstripe Tarantula is a species of spider in the family Theraphosidae, found in Venezuela and Brazil. It was first described by Reginald Innes Pocock in 1903, being arboreal in nature and quite reclusive, and also the smallest tarantula of the Avicularia genus.

== Description ==
Females live 10 to 12 years, while males only live 2 to 3. Both sexes own the same pattern, having a reddish-brown carapace and legs with white segmentations between each sections of the legs. The opisthosoma is black with orange-reddish spots almost on the top, extending almost to the bottom of the opisthosoma. They are rare to come by for sale, especially since their egg sacks produce 20 to 40 eggs.

== Behavior ==
While they own a certain tolerance of being together, they are not by any means a communal species. They are a very reclusive species, and they will bolt to their hide if they notice you while they're out.
