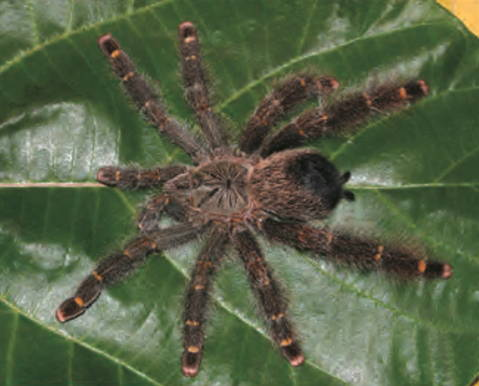
- Female
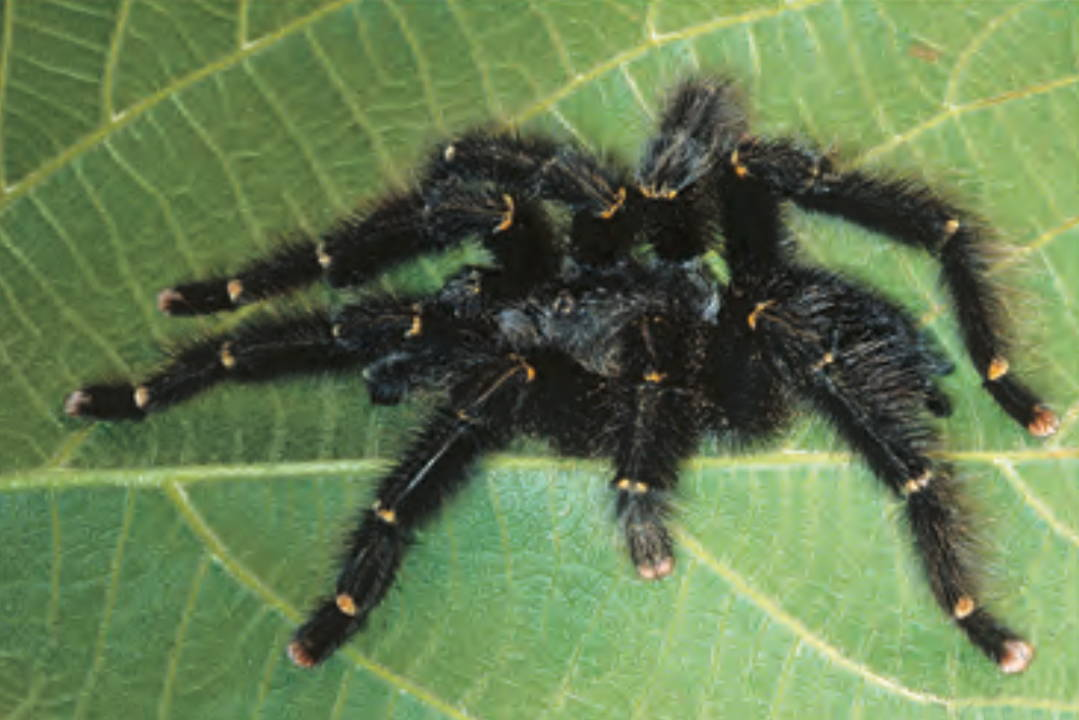
- Male

Scientific classification
- Kingdom: Animalia
- Phylum: Arthropoda
- Subphylum: Chelicerata
- Class: Arachnida
- Order: Araneae
- Infraorder: Mygalomorphae
- Family: Theraphosidae
- Genus: Avicularia
- Species: A. rufa

Binomial name
- Avicularia rufa Schiapelli & Gerschman, 1945

= Avicularia rufa =

Species of spider

Avicularia rufa is a species of spider in the family Theraphosidae. Specimens from the Brazilian states of Mato Grosso and Rondônia have regularly been misidentified as Avicularia juruensis. One difference is the vivid yellow rings on the legs of A. rufa compared to the paler rings of A. juruensis.

== Description ==
Mature individuals have brown carapaces with short golden hairs (setae) with a slight purple sheen. Females have abdomens with long greyish brown hairs on the front of the upper (dorsal) surface and the sides; males have these longer hairs evenly distributed. Both sexes have legs and palps with short brown hairs with a pink sheen and long brown hairs with darker bases and a whitish apex. The femora, tibiae and metatarsi of the legs have vivid yellow rings on the ends furthest from the body.

== Taxonomy ==
Avicularia rufa was first described in 1945 by Schiapelli and Gerschman. Specimens from the Brazilian states of Mato Grosso and Rondônia have been consistently misidentified as Avicularia juruensis. This area is south of the range in which A. jurensis is considered to occur. Apart from differences in the male and female genitalia, A. rufa has bright yellow leg rings, hairs (setae) with a whitish apex on the legs, and leg I shorter than leg IV, whereas A. juruensis has paler yellow leg rings, leg hairs more uniformly coloured, and legs I and IV more-or-less equal in length.

== Venom ==
The neurotoxic venom of Avicularia rufa (misidentified as A. juruensis) has been analysed for potential as an antimicrobial. 11 antimicrobial peptides were found, one of which (named juruin on the assumption that the species was A. juruensis) showed strong activity against fungi. The active components of the venom closely resembled those of other theraphosid spiders, such as Haplopelma schmidti.
