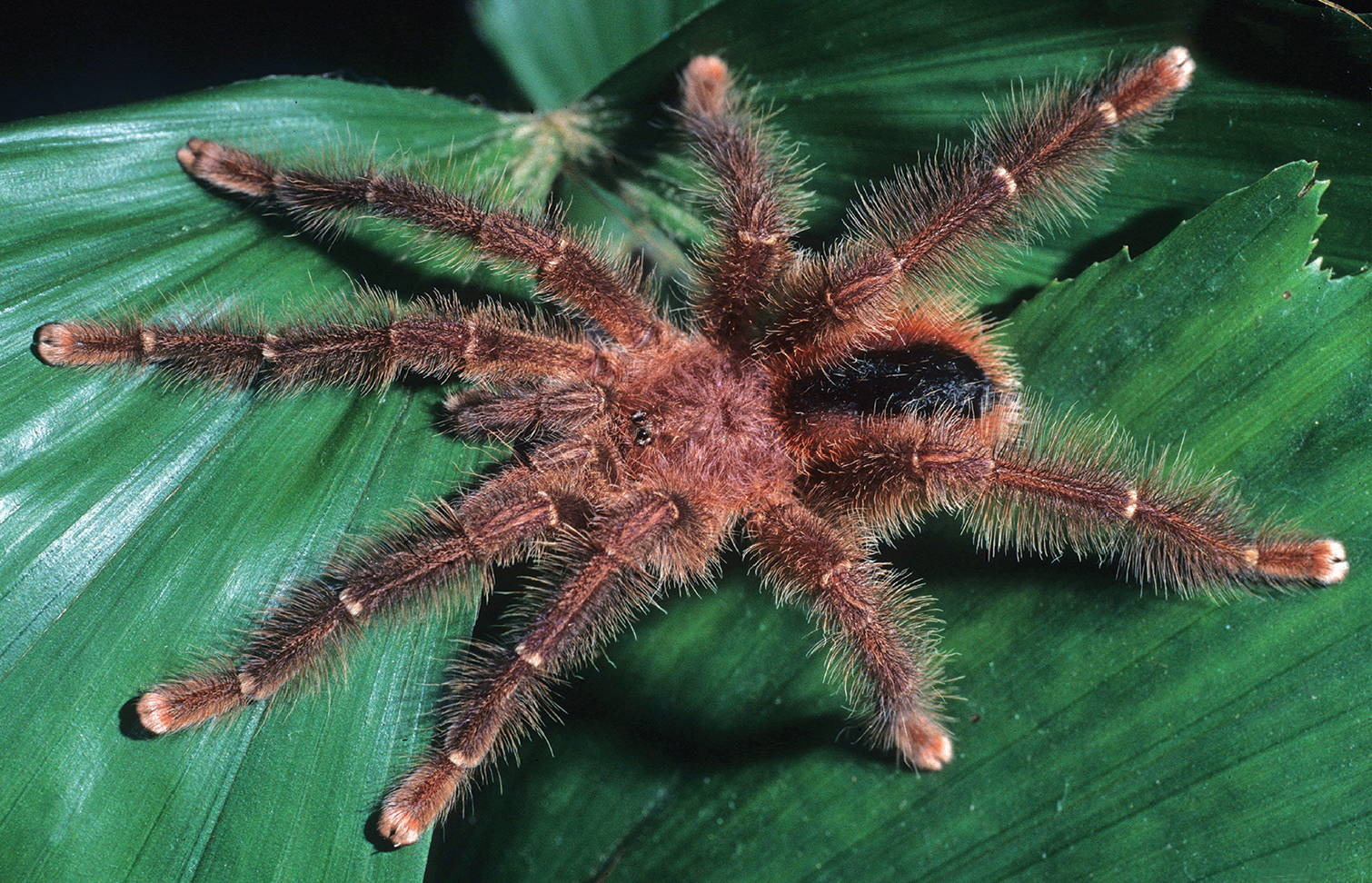
- Male

Scientific classification
- Kingdom: Animalia
- Phylum: Arthropoda
- Subphylum: Chelicerata
- Class: Arachnida
- Order: Araneae
- Infraorder: Mygalomorphae
- Family: Theraphosidae
- Genus: Avicularia
- Species: A. lynnae

Binomial name
- Avicularia lynnae Fukushima & Bertani, 2017

= Avicularia lynnae =

Species of spider

Avicularia lynnae is a species of spiders in the family Theraphosidae, found in Ecuador and Peru. It was first described in 2017. The specific name refers to Lynn West, wife of mygalomorph expert Rick C. West.
