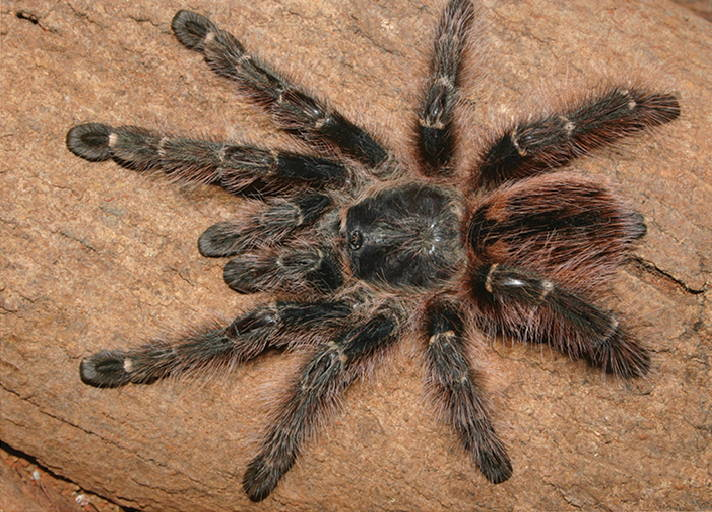
- Female
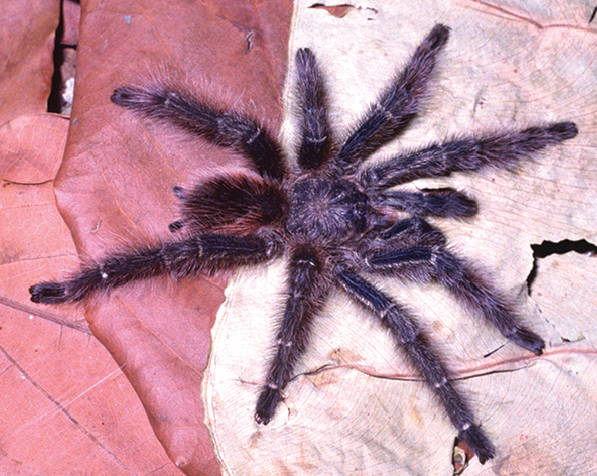
- Male

Scientific classification
- Kingdom: Animalia
- Phylum: Arthropoda
- Subphylum: Chelicerata
- Class: Arachnida
- Order: Araneae
- Infraorder: Mygalomorphae
- Family: Theraphosidae
- Genus: Avicularia
- Species: A. taunayi

Binomial name
- Avicularia taunayi (Mello-Leitão, 1920)

Synonyms
- Ancylochiros taunayi Mello-Leitão, 1920

= Avicularia taunayi =

Species of spider

Avicularia taunayi is a species of spider in the family Theraphosidae found in Brazil.
