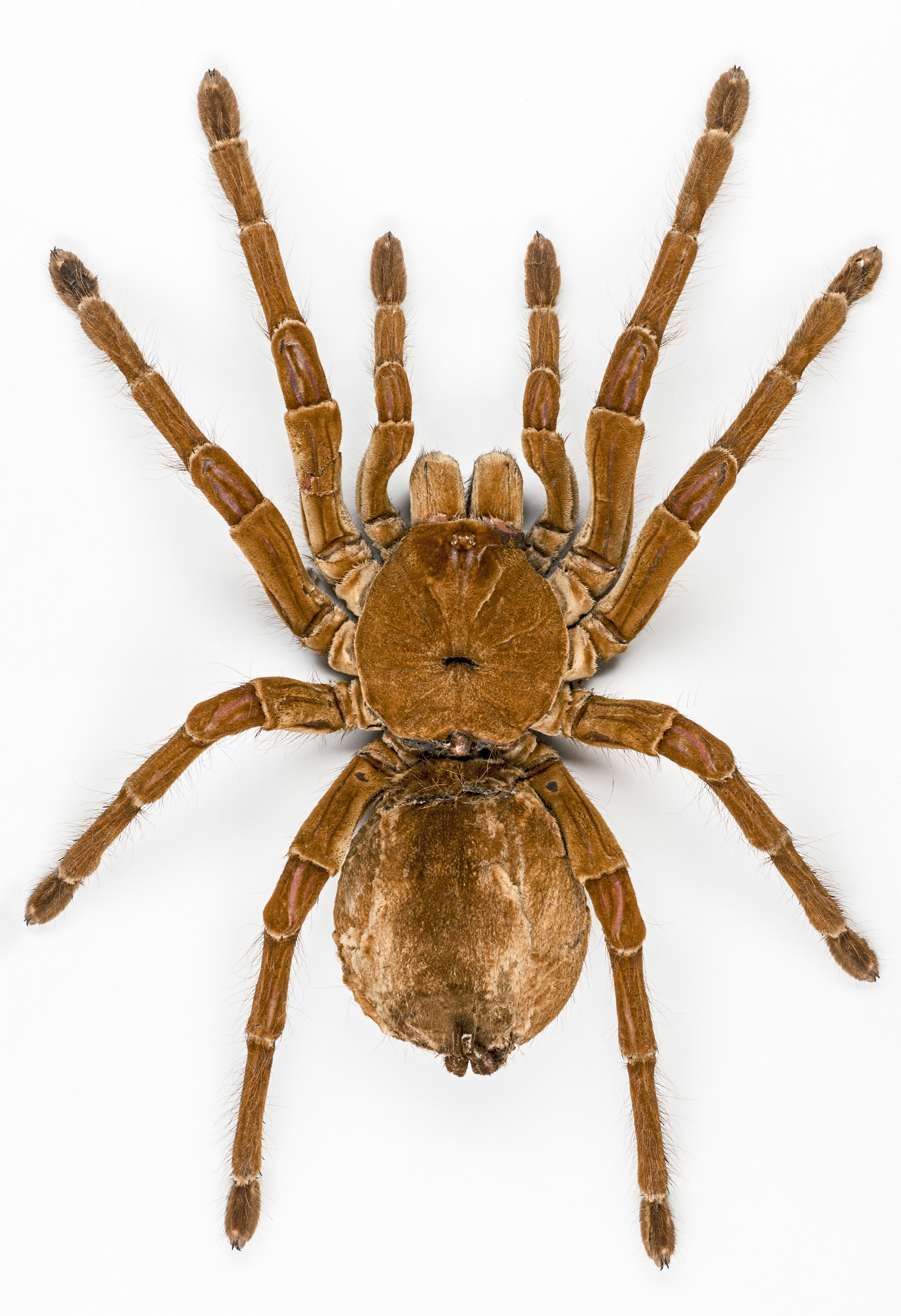
- Female Theraphosa blondi

Scientific classification
- Kingdom: Animalia
- Phylum: Arthropoda
- Subphylum: Chelicerata
- Class: Arachnida
- Order: Araneae
- Infraorder: Mygalomorphae
- Family: Theraphosidae
- Genus: Theraphosa; Walckenaer, 1805

Type species
- T. blondi (Latreille, 1804)

Synonyms
- Pseudotheraphosa Tinter, 1991; Theraphosia Dahl, 1901

= Theraphosa =

Genus of spiders

Theraphosa is a genus of South American tarantulas that was first described by Charles Athanase Walckenaer in 1805. The Theraphosa spiders are some of the largest known to science. As of May 2020 it contains three species, found in Guyana, Brazil, Venezuela, and Colombia. They stridulate by rubbing setae on their pedipalps and legs.

== Diagnostic ==
Tarantulas of this genus are characterized by their large size, and the lack of long hairs in the patella and tibia sections of the legs. It can also be further distinguished by the presence of stridulating hairs on the prolateral coxae 1 and 2. Females also own a unique single spermatheca.

== Behavior ==
These tarantulas are found in holes in the ground, usually abandoned burrows, which they adopt and use as their own. They are usually found near rivers, and eat a great amount of invertebrates and very small vertebrates, such as small frogs and lizards.

== Species ==
As of October 2025 the World Spider Catalog accepted the following four species:

- Theraphosa apophysis (Tinter, 1991) - Colombia, Venezuela and Brazil
- Theraphosa blondi (Latreille, 1804) - Venezuela, Brazil and Guyana
- Theraphosa spinipes (Ausserer, 1871) – Brazil
- Theraphosa stirmi Rudloff & Weinmann, 2010 - Guyana and Brazil

One species has been moved to the genus Sericopelma:

- Theraphosa panamanum Karsch, 1880 → Sericopelma panamanum
