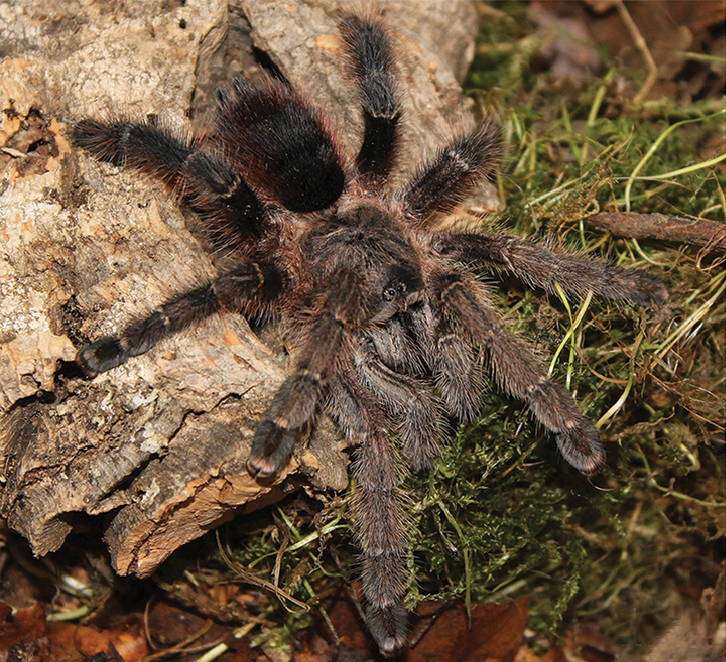
- Female

Scientific classification
- Kingdom: Animalia
- Phylum: Arthropoda
- Subphylum: Chelicerata
- Class: Arachnida
- Order: Araneae
- Infraorder: Mygalomorphae
- Family: Theraphosidae
- Genus: Avicularia
- Species: A. merianae

Binomial name
- Avicularia merianae Fukushima & Bertani, 2017

= Avicularia merianae =

Species of spider

Avicularia merianae is a species of spiders in the family Theraphosidae, found in Peru. It was first described in 2017. It is named after the Dutch-German naturalist and painter Maria Sibylla Merian, in recognition of her studies on tarantulas.
