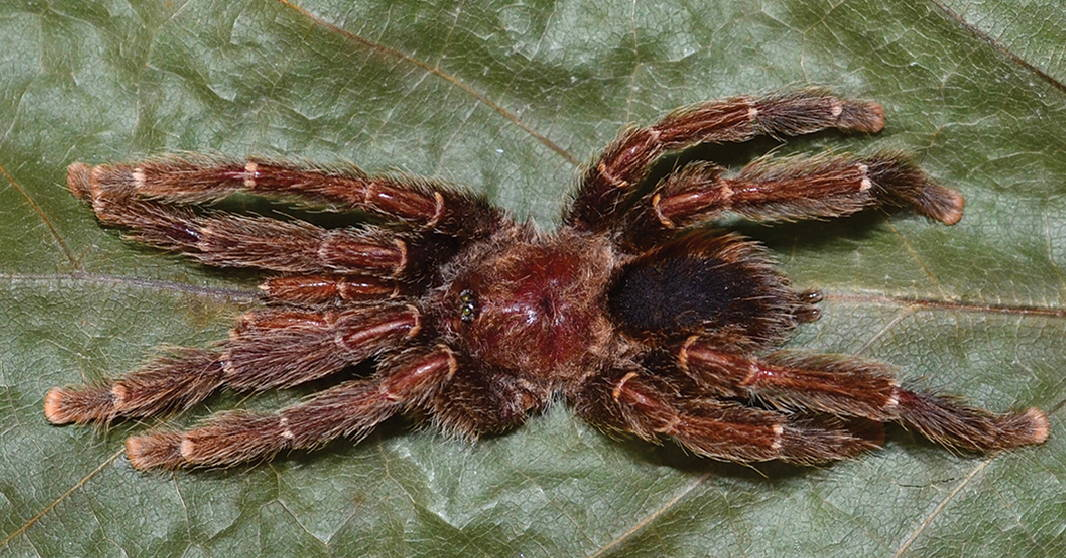
- Male

Scientific classification
- Kingdom: Animalia
- Phylum: Arthropoda
- Subphylum: Chelicerata
- Class: Arachnida
- Order: Araneae
- Infraorder: Mygalomorphae
- Family: Theraphosidae
- Genus: Avicularia
- Species: A. caei

Binomial name
- Avicularia caei Fukushima & Bertani, 2017

= Avicularia caei =

Species of spider

Avicularia caei is a species of spiders in the family Theraphosidae found in Brazil. It was first described in 2017. The specific name honours Carlos Eduardo Gurgel Paiola, known as "Caê".

== Traits ==
Members of the genus Avicularia are New World tarantulas recognized by their distinct pinkish foot pads and dense, hairy legs. Avicularia caei was distinguished from closely related species through detailed analysis of its reproductive organs and leg structures.
