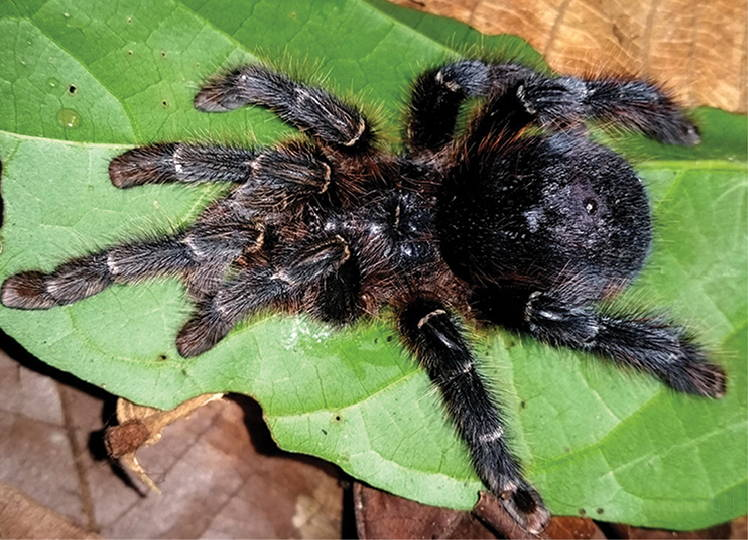
- Female

Scientific classification
- Kingdom: Animalia
- Phylum: Arthropoda
- Subphylum: Chelicerata
- Class: Arachnida
- Order: Araneae
- Infraorder: Mygalomorphae
- Family: Theraphosidae
- Genus: Avicularia
- Species: A. hirschii

Binomial name
- Avicularia hirschii Bullmer, Thierer-Lutz & Schmidt, 2006

= Avicularia hirschii =

Species of spider

Avicularia hirschii is a species of spider in the family Theraphosidae, found in Ecuador, Peru and Brazil.
