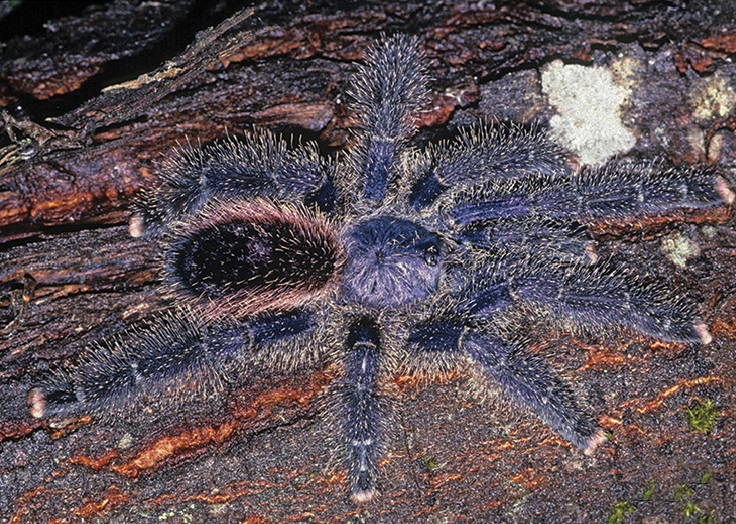
- Female, morphotype 2
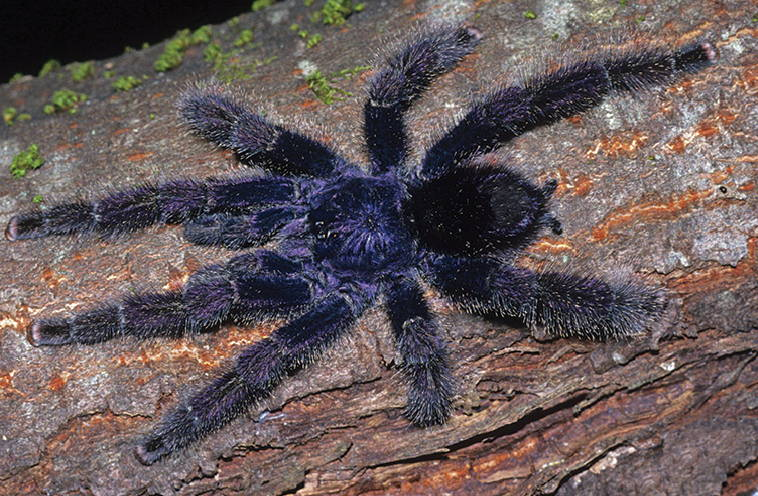
- Male, morphotype 2

Scientific classification
- Kingdom: Animalia
- Phylum: Arthropoda
- Subphylum: Chelicerata
- Class: Arachnida
- Order: Araneae
- Infraorder: Mygalomorphae
- Family: Theraphosidae
- Genus: Avicularia
- Species: A. juruensis

Binomial name
- Avicularia juruensis (Mello-Leitão, 1923)
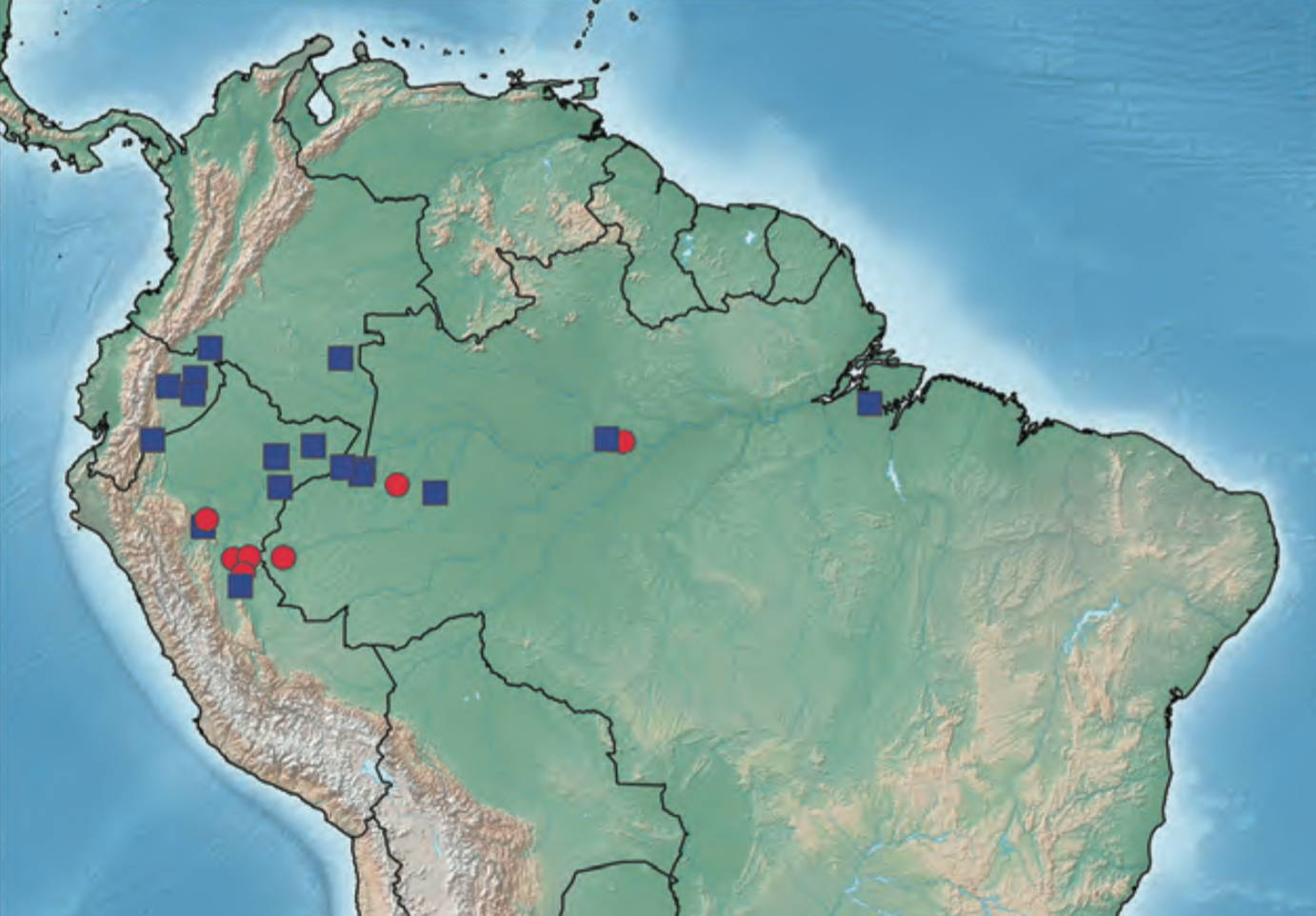
- Red circles = morphotype 1, blue squares = morphotype 2

Synonyms
- Avicularia urticans Schmidt, 1994

= Avicularia juruensis =

Species of spider

Avicularia juruensis is a species of spider in the family Theraphosidae, found in South America (Colombia, Ecuador, Peru and Brazil). Avicularia urticans was brought into synonymy in 2017. It has been given the English name Amazonian pink toe spider. Under the synonym Avicularia urticans, it is also known as the Peruvian pinktoe tarantula. It is a large mygalomorph spider, with a maximum body length over 30 mm (1.2 in) and the longest fully extended leg about 60 mm (2.4 in). Like other species in the genus Avicularia, specimens under this name are sold as pets, although their identity has not been confirmed by taxonomic studies.

== Description ==
The adult female Avicularia juruensis has a carapace about 19 mm long and 17 wide, and an abdomen about 24 mm long and 17 mm wide. The adult male has a smaller body, with a carapace about 15 mm long and wide, and notably shorter and narrower abdomen, about 17 mm long and 12 mm wide. The fourth leg is slightly longer than the first, both being longer than the middle two. The first leg was measured as 53 mm in a female and 56 mm in a male, the fourth leg as 58 mm in a female and 60 mm in a male. The eyes are arranged in two rows of four, the front (anterior) row being slightly curved forwards and the back (posterior) row slightly curved backwards. The abdomen carries type II urticating hairs (setae), up to about 1 mm long in males and 0.7 mm long in females.

The mature female has two long, well separated spermathecae, expanded in the middle to about 1.5 times the width of the end portions. The mature male has a globous palpal bulb with a small subtegulum and a well developed protrusion on the tegulum. The embolus forming the tip of the palpal bulb is about 5 mm long. The forward facing side (prolateral) of the first leg has an unbranched protrusion (apophysis) on the tibia.

As with other species of Avicularia, juveniles have distinctively different colour patterns to adults. Juveniles of A. juruensis lack any kind of metallic sheen, have black tarsi contrasting with the rest of the leg which is lighter, and also have a reddish upper surface to the abdomen with a central longitudinal black stripe and separated transverse black stripes. Adults lose the stripes on the abdomen and gain a metallic sheen. There are two colour forms or "morphotypes". Morphotype 1 has a golden and pink sheen, a whitish carapace and whitish leg rings and longer light brown hairs evenly distributed over shorter darker hairs. Males appear to lack whitish tips to the hairs on the upper surface of the abdomen. Morphotype 2 has an intense purple sheen and yellower leg rings. Females have long reddish brown hairs on the front and sides of the upper abdomen over shorter darker hairs. Males have white-tipped hairs evenly distributed on the upper abdomen. Morphotype 1 is more commonly found in Brazil, morphotype 2 in Ecuador and Peru, but this is not an absolute difference. Morphotype 1 is the form previously known as A. urticans.

Variation in colour patterns

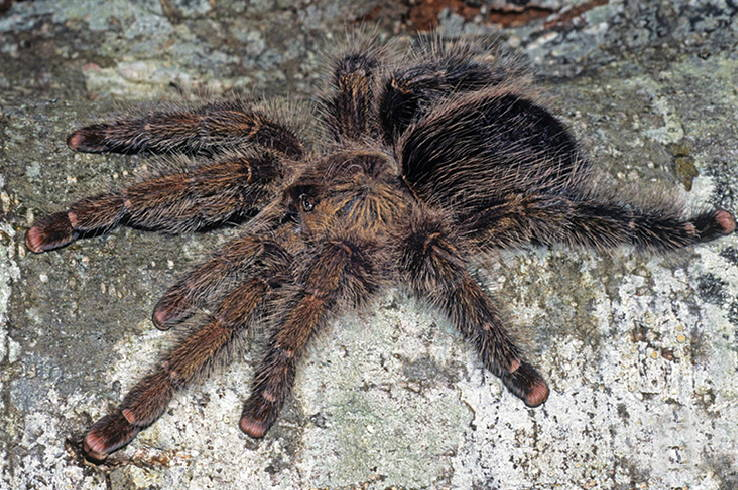
Female, morphotype 1

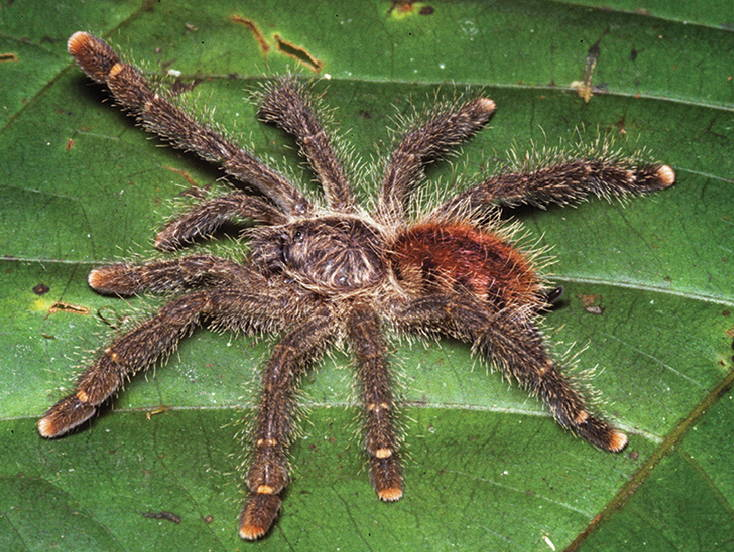
Juvenile, morphotype 2

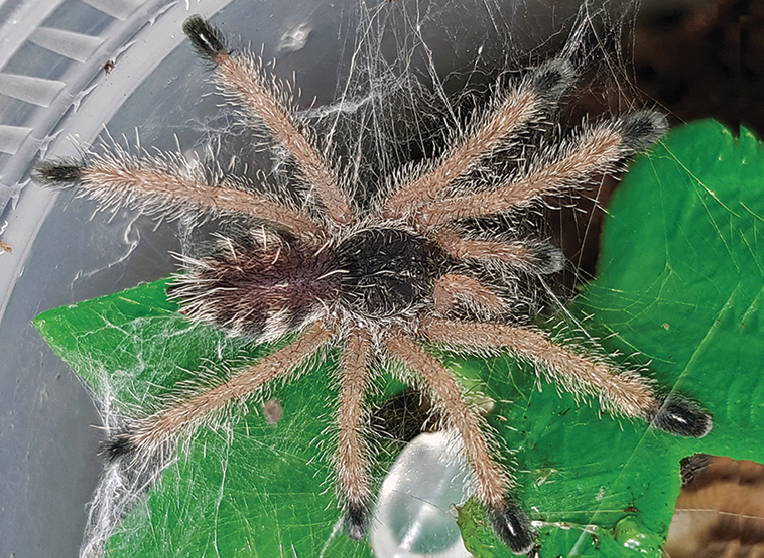
Immature, morphotype 2

== Taxonomy ==
Avicularia juruensis was first described by Cândido Firmino de Mello-Leitão in 1923, based on specimens from Juruá in Brazil. The specific name is based on the location in which the species was found. In 1994, Gunter Schmidt separately described Avicularia urticans, based on specimens from Peru. In 2017, Caroline Fukushima and Rogério Bertani synonymized the two, saying that A. urticans was indistinguishable from A. juruensis, although there were some differences in colour.

The name A. juruensis has been misapplied to specimens of Avicularia rufa from the Brazilian states of Mato Grosso and Rondônia, south of the area in which A. jurensis is considered to occur. Apart from differences in the male and female genitalia, A. juruensis has paler leg rings, more uniformly coloured hairs (setae) on the legs, and legs I and IV more-or-less equal in length, whereas A. rufa has bright yellow leg rings, leg hairs with a whitish apex, and leg I shorter than leg IV.

== Behaviour ==
Detailed studies of the life-cycle and habits of most Avicularia species have been described as "practically nonexistent". An adult female Avicularia juruensis was seen on the side of a palm tree feeding on a greater sac-winged bat (Saccopteryx bilineata). In Peru, the species has been known to swim across large rivers.

== Distribution and habitat ==
Avicularia juruensis is found in central South America, in Colombia, Ecuador, Peru and Brazil, where it is found in the states of states of Amazonas, Acre and Pará. Like other members of the genus, it is arboreal, building silken retreats.
