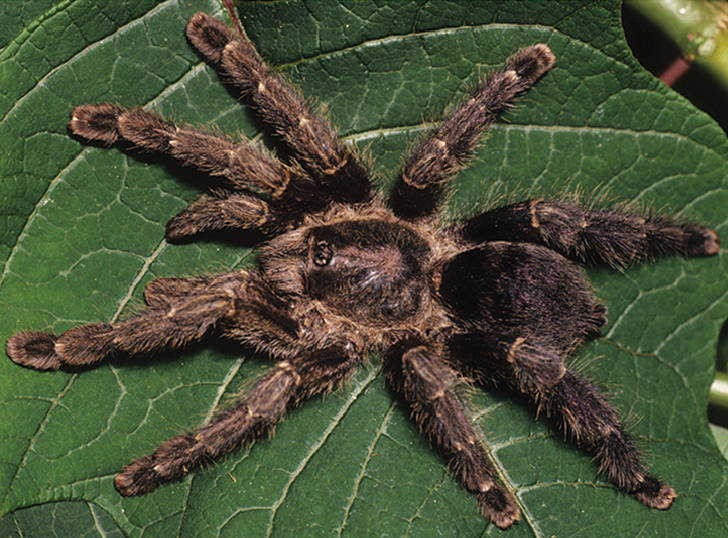
- Female, southern form
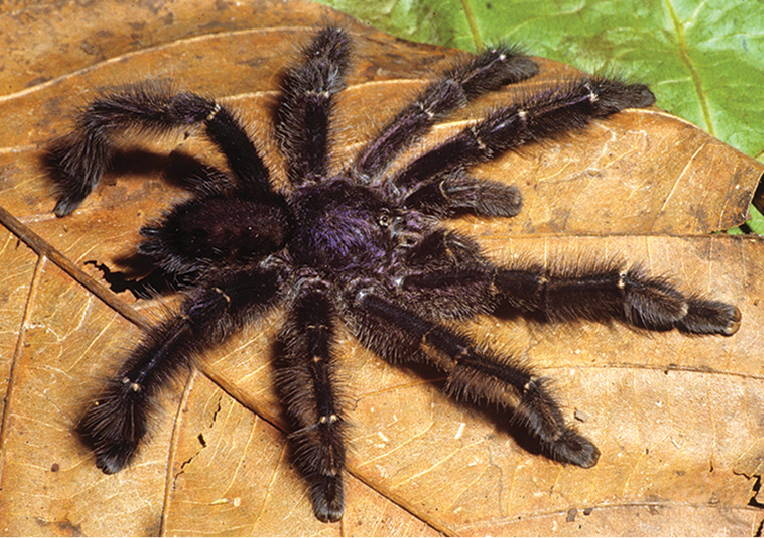
- Male, southern form

Scientific classification
- Kingdom: Animalia
- Phylum: Arthropoda
- Subphylum: Chelicerata
- Class: Arachnida
- Order: Araneae
- Infraorder: Mygalomorphae
- Family: Theraphosidae
- Genus: Avicularia
- Species: A. purpurea

Binomial name
- Avicularia purpurea Kirk, 1990

= Avicularia purpurea =

Species of spider

Avicularia purpurea, also called the Ecuadorian purple tarantula or Ecuador purple pinktoe, is a species of spider belonging to the family Theraphosidae (tarantulas).

== Distribution ==
These spiders are mainly present in Ecuador in the Amazon Region.

== Habitat ==
This species can be found in very different habitats, but frequently it is present in agricultural areas, especially in the field of grazing cattle. Sometimes it can be found in holes of walls of buildings or in the spaces below the roofs.

== Description ==
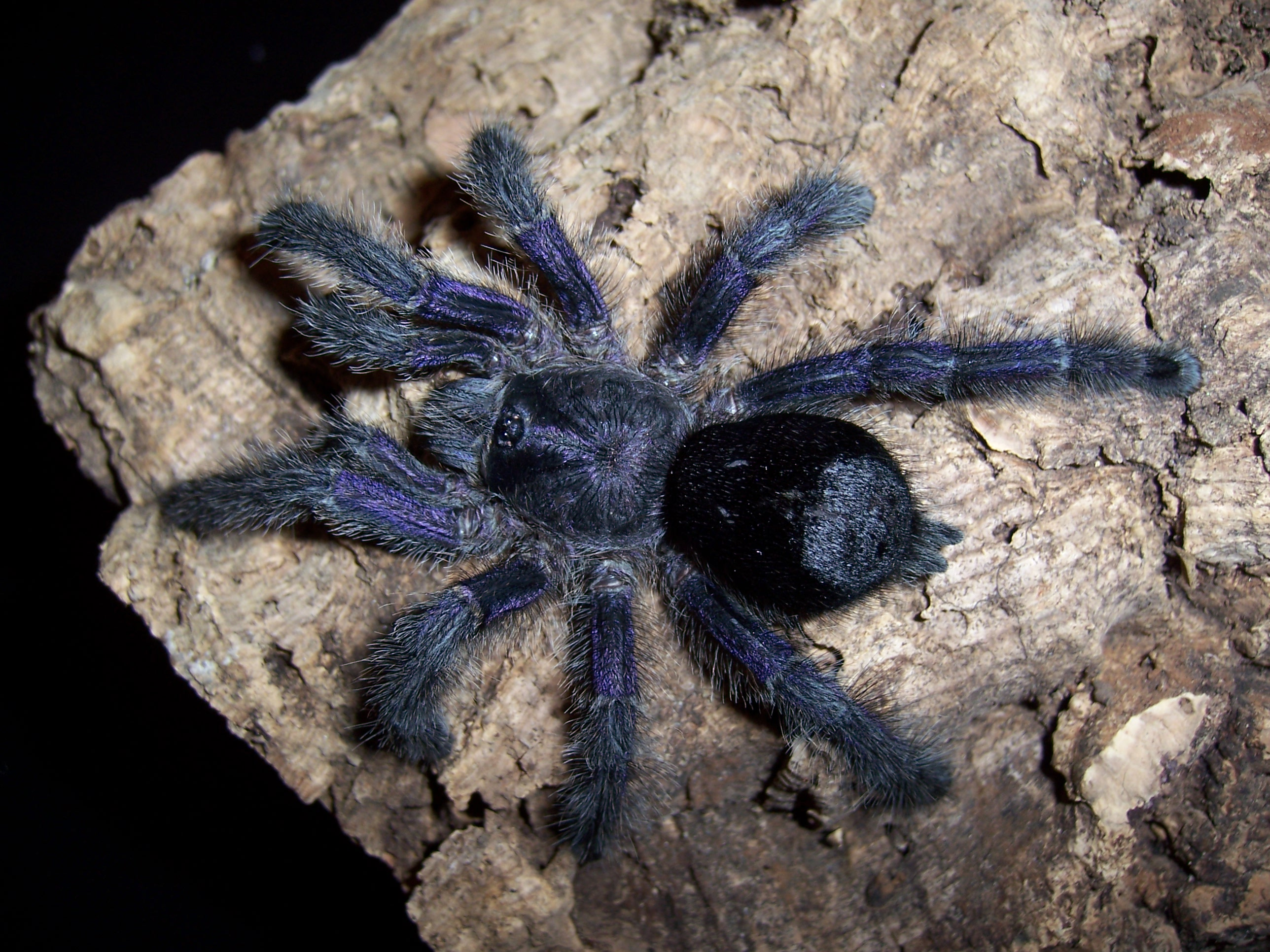
Female

Avicularia purpurea can reach a length of about 13 centimetres (5.1 in), Avicularia.

In daylight this spider discloses a quite intense purple-blue iridescence on the dorsal surface of the cephalothorax and on legs, palps and chelicerae. The long setae covering the legs and palps are dark red-brown. The tarsal and metatarsal scopulae are very dark brown. The tarsal tufts are pale cream-pink in colour. The abdomen is velvet-black and covered with stinging hairs.

== Behavior ==
Avicularia purpurea is primarily an arboreal spider. This climbing species builds its nests primarily in hollows in the trees, sometimes in the vicinity of epiphytic plants. These spiders eat mostly crickets, cockroaches, meal worms, waxworms and darkling beetles, but they also can catch small rodents. During mating the females become very aggressive towards the males. A few months after mating the female lays up to 120 eggs in a cocoon. Six to eight weeks later between 50 and 120 nymphs hatch.
