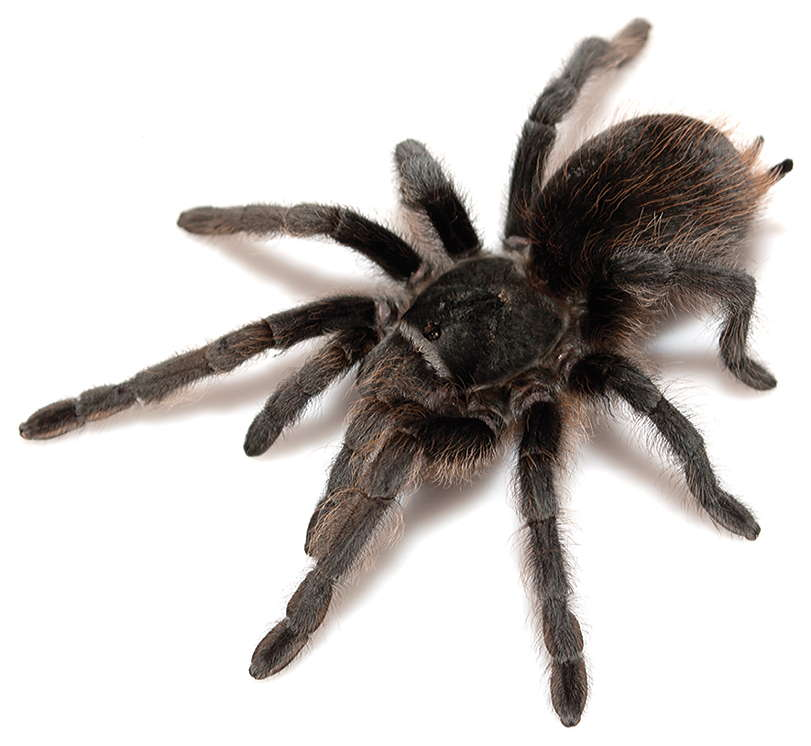
- Female
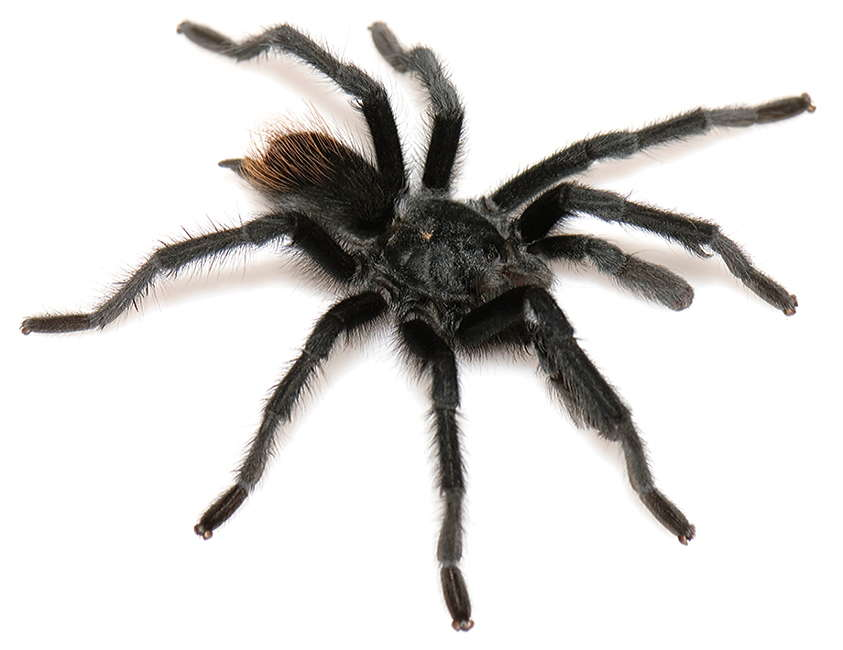
- Male

Scientific classification
- Kingdom: Animalia
- Phylum: Arthropoda
- Subphylum: Chelicerata
- Class: Arachnida
- Order: Araneae
- Infraorder: Mygalomorphae
- Family: Theraphosidae
- Genus: Aphonopelma
- Species: A. marxi

Binomial name
- Aphonopelma marxi (Simon, 1891)

Synonyms
- Eurypelma marxi Simon, 1891; Delopelma marxi (Simon, 1891); Delopelma simulatum Chamberlin & Ivie, 1939; Aphonopelma behlei Chamberlin, 1940; Aphonopelma simulatum (Chamberlin & Ivie, 1939); Aphonopelma vogeli Smith, 1995; Aphonopelma vogelae Smith, 1995

= Aphonopelma marxi =

Species of spider

Aphonopelma marxi is a species of spider in the family Theraphosidae (tarantulas), found in United States (Arizona, New Mexico, Colorado and Utah). Aphonopelma behlei and A. vogelae, at one time considered separate species, are now considered to be synonyms.

== Description ==
Aphonopelma marxi is generally dark brown to black in color, very hairy, with some orange to red hairs on the abdomen. The mature male's carapace ranges from 8.3 to 10.5 mm (0.33 to 0.41 in) long, the mature female being larger, with a carapace from 13.5 to 15.3 mm (0.53 to 0.60 in) long. The total body length of a female, including the chelicerae, is around 35 mm (1.4 in). A. marxi can be distinguished from other species of the genus living in the same places by its dark color, overall hairy appearance, size and habitat. In males, the ratio of the length of the femur of the first leg to the length of the metatarsus of the same leg is greater than 1.69, whereas in similar species the ratio is smaller. In females, the ratio of the length of the femur of the first leg to the length of metatarsus of the third leg is greater than 1.76, being smaller in similar species. Another difference between males and females is that the males have "hooks" on the first legs that are used during mating.

== Taxonomy ==
The species was first described by Eugène Simon in 1891 as Eurypelma marxi. The original type specimen on which the species was described has been lost; in 1997, T. R. Prentice designated a neotype. Placement in the genus Aphonopelma was first made by Andrew M. Smith in 1995. Smith also recognized two species, A. behlei and A. vogelae, that in analyses performed by Hamilton et al. in 2016 were not distinguished from A. marxi on either morphological or molecular grounds, and so were treated as junior synonyms. Aphonopelma marxi belongs to the "Marxi species group" – a group of mainly black species, often found in high-elevation habitats. Other species of the group include A. catalina, A. chiricahua, A. madera, A. peloncillo and A. vorhiesi.

== Distribution and habitat ==
Aphonopelma marxi is widely distributed in areas of higher elevation in the "Four Corners" region of northern Arizona, northwestern New Mexico, southwestern Colorado, and southeastern Utah. It is found in a variety of habitats, including mixed conifer forests and sagebrush steppe. The species is described as "very common" in these areas, but is difficult to find as it normally remains in its hidden burrow. The burrows of all the Marxi species group have been described as "incredibly difficult to find".
