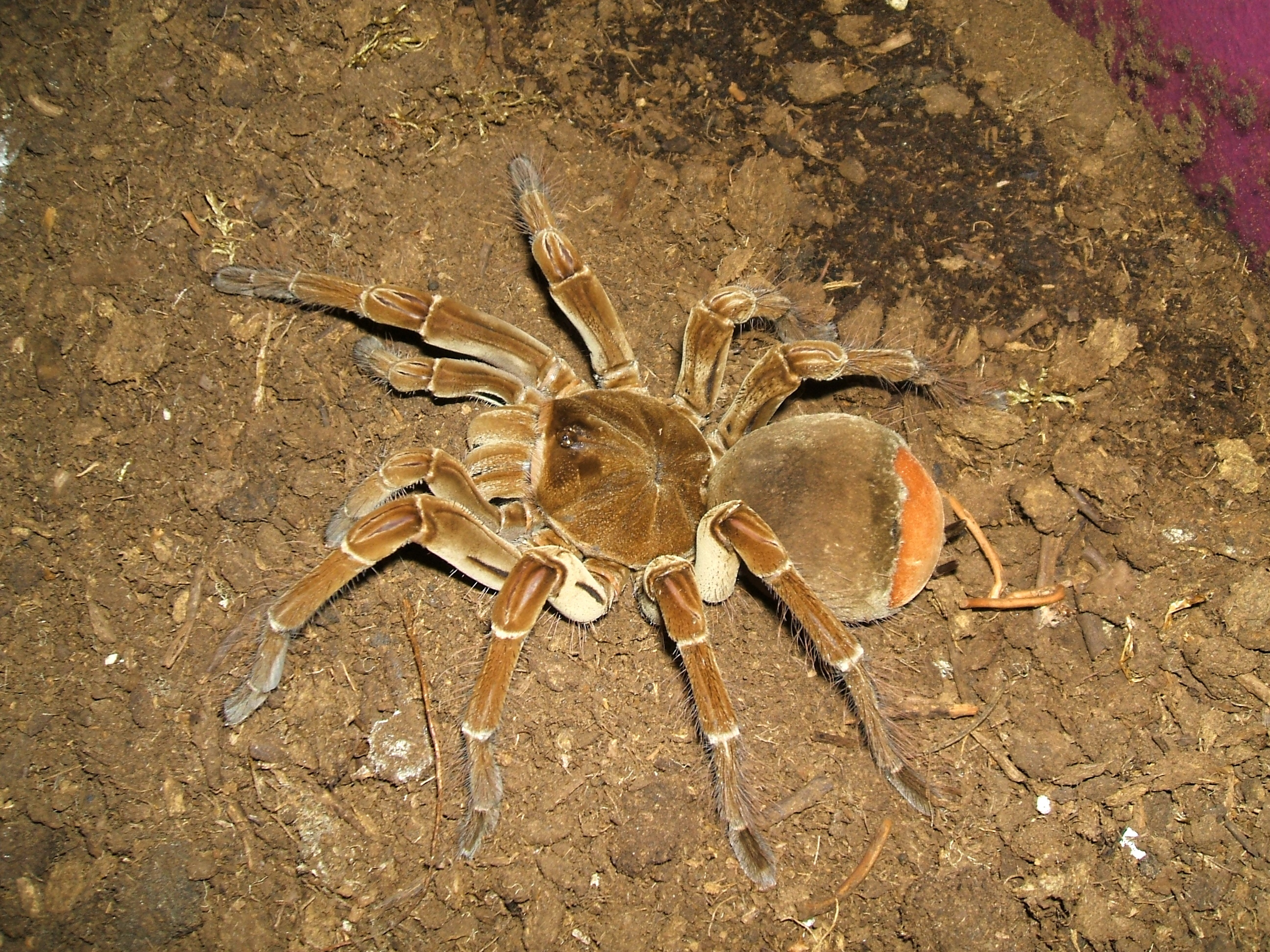
- Female of Theraphosa stirmi

Scientific classification
- Kingdom: Animalia
- Phylum: Arthropoda
- Subphylum: Chelicerata
- Class: Arachnida
- Order: Araneae
- Infraorder: Mygalomorphae
- Family: Theraphosidae
- Genus: Theraphosa
- Species: T. stirmi

Binomial name
- Theraphosa stirmi Rudloff & Weinmann, 2010

= Theraphosa stirmi =

Species of spider

Theraphosa stirmi is a species of tarantula belonging to the family Theraphosidae. It is known as the burgundy goliath bird eater.

== Distribution ==
This species occurs in Guyana and Brazil, in tropical South America-making it a new world tarantula.

== Description ==
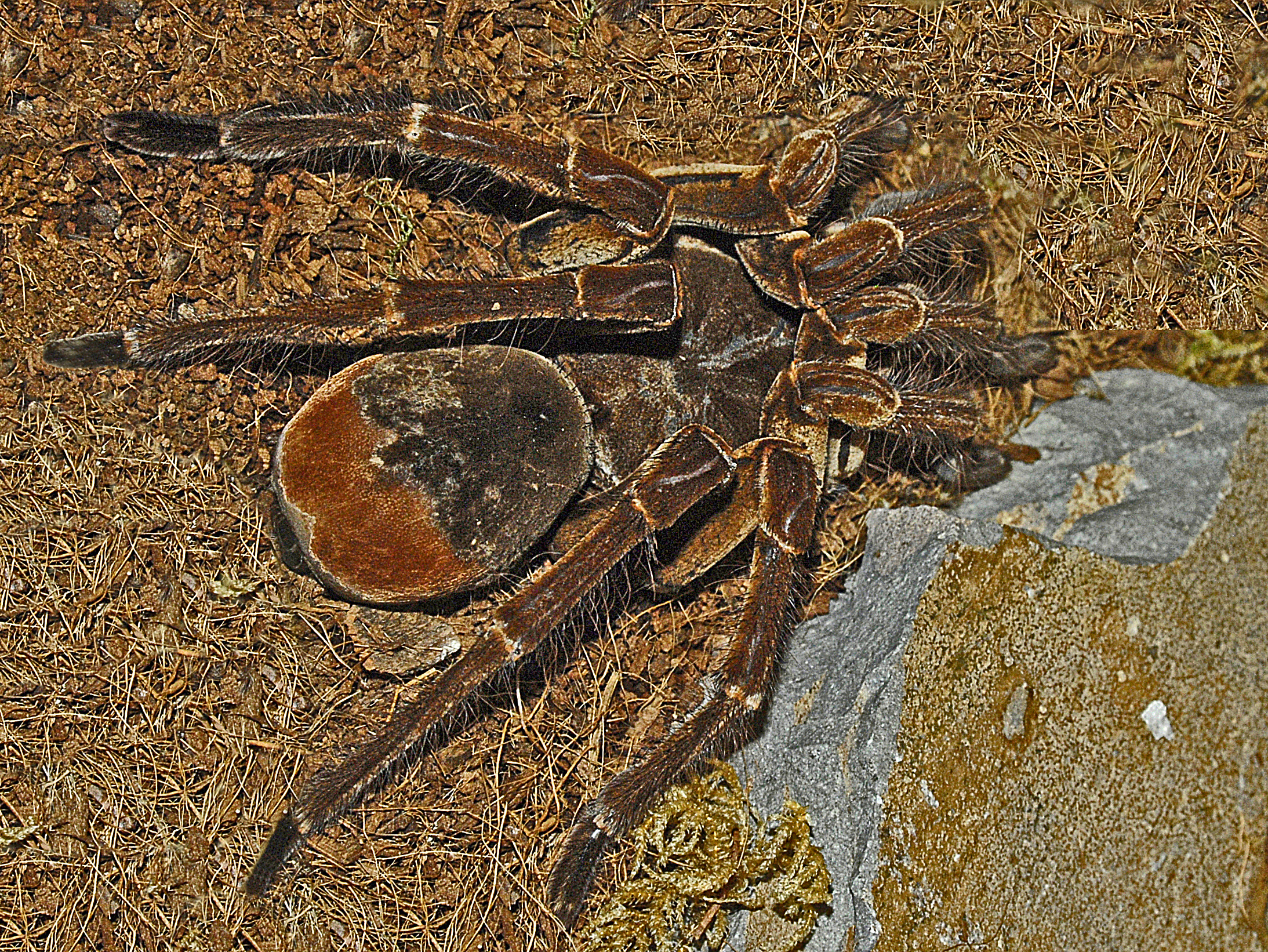
Theraphosa stirmi

In Theraphosa stirmi the carapace can reach a length of 40 mm (1.6 in) and a width of 37 mm (1.5 in). The longest leg (the fourth) in a male had a total length of 110 mm (4.3 in). Coloration of these heavy-bodied spiders varies from rusty brown or rich burgundy-brown to dark brown, with reddish setae on legs and abdomen and white lines on the legs. Adult males lack mating spurs or tibial apophyses. Spiderlings and juveniles have pink tarsi on the front two pairs of legs.

== Behavior ==
These tarantulas hide themselves in long tubes that they dig under the surface or use abandoned rodent burrows. It is a crepuscular and nocturnal species and it is quite defensive. When threatened this species will stridulate (hiss) to warn predators, it may also rear up and expose its fangs. Another self-defence mechanism of this spider is to use its back legs to flick urticating hairs from its abdomen. These hairs are microbarbed and can cause irritation of the skin and when inhaled irritate the nose and throat. As last resort it will strike with its fangs. In captivity it feeds on any suitable sized invertebrates such as large grasshoppers, cockroaches and crickets.
