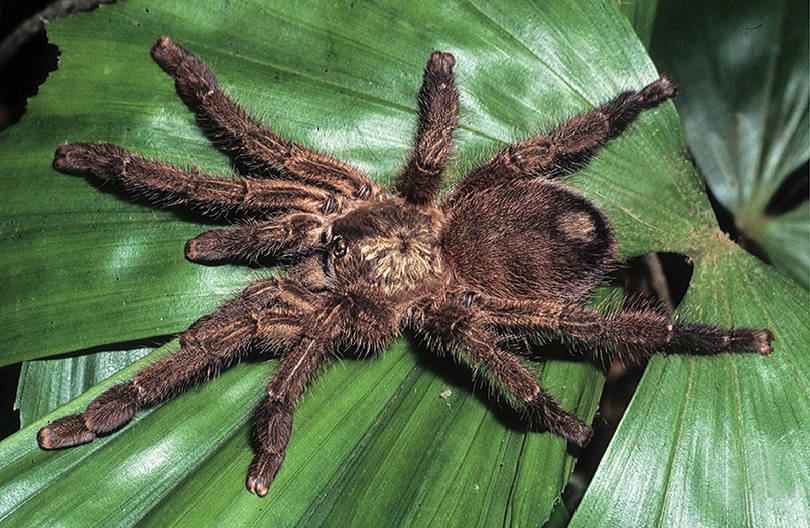
- Female
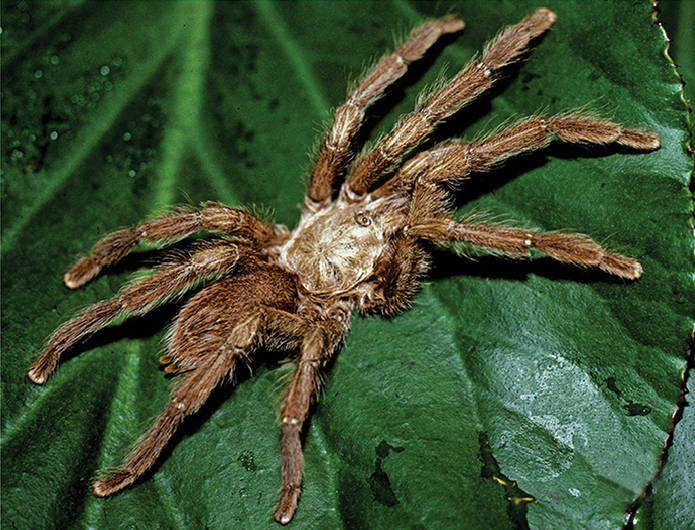
- Male

Scientific classification
- Kingdom: Animalia
- Phylum: Arthropoda
- Subphylum: Chelicerata
- Class: Arachnida
- Order: Araneae
- Infraorder: Mygalomorphae
- Family: Theraphosidae
- Genus: Caribena
- Species: C. laeta

Binomial name
- Caribena laeta (C.L. Koch, 1842)

Synonyms
- Mygale laeta C.L. Koch, 1842; Mygale caesia C.L. Koch, 1842; Typhochlaena caesia (C.L. Koch, 1842); Avicularia caesia (C.L. Koch, 1842); Avicularia laeta (C.L. Koch, 1842)

= Caribena laeta =

Species of spider

Caribena laeta is a species of spider in the family Theraphosidae, found in the US Virgin Islands, Puerto Rico, and Cuba, the last dubiously according to Caroline Fukushima and Rogério Bertani in 2017. It was first described by Carl Ludwig Koch in 1842 under the name Mygale laeta.

== Description ==
Females live from 10 to 12 years, while males only live 3 to 4. Male's carapace are a light brown, looking almost a pale gold, the opisthosoma is a pale brown color, with a darker urticating patch near the spinnerets. The legs are a light brown, with some darker brown closer to the bottom, with some metallic blue or green near the bottom tip of the legs, which can be seen quite well when in a threat pose. Females own much the same coloration but darker, and the urticating patch being lighter, instead of the darker color seen in males.

== Habitat ==
The data for this area is based on Corozal in Puerto Rico, as this tarantula can be found in this area. The climate that can be experienced in this area is tropical. The average rainfall of this area is 1,700, with average temperatures of 26°C.

== Behavior ==
It is an arboreal tarantula, which webs quite a lot, they are also quite docile but are very skittish. They can throw urticating hairs though this is very rare, while they are able to bite this is incredibly rare.
