= Avicularia avicularia =

Pinktoe tarantula
- At Madre de Dios, Peru

Scientific classification
- Kingdom: Animalia
- Phylum: Arthropoda
- Subphylum: Chelicerata
- Class: Arachnida
- Order: Araneae
- Infraorder: Mygalomorphae
- Family: Theraphosidae
- Genus: Avicularia
- Species: A. avicularia

Binomial name
- Avicularia avicularia (Linnaeus, 1758)

Synonyms
- Aranea avicularia; Aranea vestiaria; Avicularia vestaria; Avicularia vestiaria; Avicularia vulpina; Mygale avicularia; Mygale scoparia; Mygale testacea; Mygale hirsutissima

Species of spider

Avicularia avicularia, sometimes called the pinktoe tarantula, is a species of tarantula native to Venezuela, Guyana, Suriname, French Guiana, Trinidad, Tobago, Peru, Bolivia and Brazil. This species is sometimes called the Guyana pinktoe, or South American pinktoe.

== Description ==
The mature pinktoe tarantula has a dark-colored body and pinkish feet, hence its name. Juvenile specimens, however, have pinkish bodies and dark-colored feet and undergo a reversal in their coloration as they approach adulthood at 4–5 years. A fully grown Pinktoe tarantula can grow up to six inches in length. They have a short lifespan, with males living 2–3 years, and females living between 6–9 years.

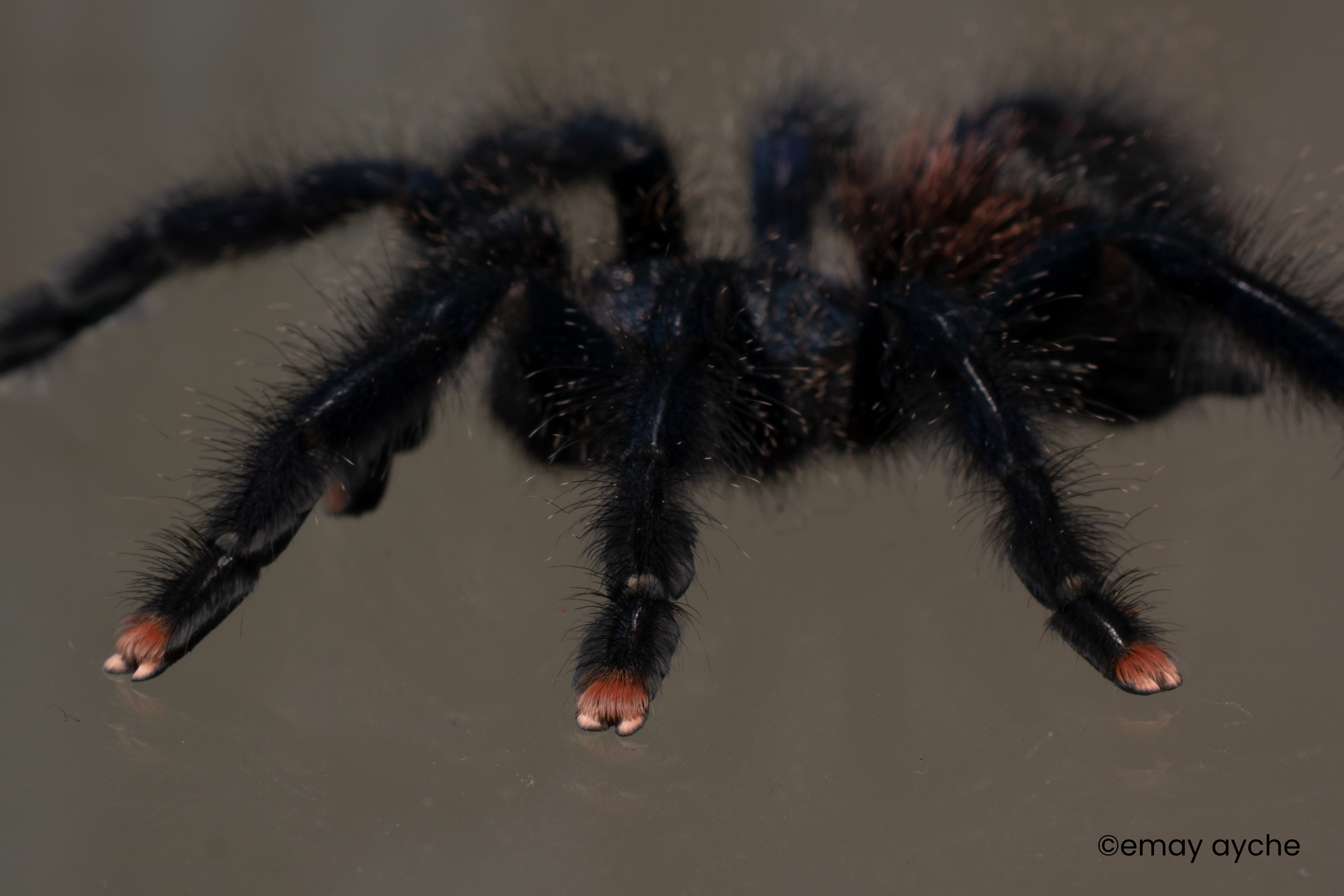
"Pink toes" of juvenile

Dimorphism has been shown in the mature stages of males and females, with males having uniformly barbed urticating hairs, while females are found only at the proximal end. Mature males also exhibit a pair of hooks on the last segment of the pedipalps, used during construction of "sperm webs" and courtship behaviors.

== Ecology ==
They are an ambush predator, using webbing as a trap and to sense movement from prey. With an enriched environment, they can display an array of behaviors such as active hunting, foraging, and even construction such as nest and tunnel building with nearby debris. The pinktoe tarantula consumes mostly insect prey and is an aggressive feeder. Some of its prey includes crickets, wax moths, grasshoppers, cockroaches and small tree frogs. They sometimes consume small lizards such as Anolis, but vertebrates usually are not a major contributor to its diet.

Common threat-responses include running or leaping away, but they may react aggressively if provoked. Defensive mechanisms include type II urticating hairs (which must be transferred via direct contact, rather than kicking the hairs into the air), propelling feces toward perceived threats, adopting a threat posture, and biting. Their venom is considered mild, even compared to other new-world tarantulas. Females are also shown to display sexual cannibalism.

== Captivity husbandry ==
The Avicularia genus, commonly known as pinktoe tarantulas, began to be imported and kept in the United States in the early to mid-2000s. Often marketed and recommended as an ideal choice for beginner tarantula enthusiasts, these spiders saw a surge in popularity. However, due to the limited information available at the time about their care requirements, many early keepers inadvertently caused the deaths of these tarantulas in captivity. Being native to rainforests and relatively high humidity climates, attempts to recreate that environment within a captive enclosure often led to conditions that were too moist and stagnant for Avicularia to thrive. While these tarantulas do naturally inhabit humid climates, they typically reside in the mid to upper canopy of trees, where humidity is moderated by wind and high air flow, creating a less stagnant environment. Keeping these factors in mind when attempting to maintain Avicularia in captivity is crucial to the health and wellbeing of the tarantulas.

Being an arboreal species, Avicularia requires a relatively tall habitat with adequate climbing space in captivity. Despite common belief and outdated information incorrectly portraying that Avicularia requires high humidity, this species should be kept on dry substrate with a water dish to achieve adequate moisture while also providing cross ventilation. This prevents stagnant air, bacteria, and excessive humidity from forming which can be fatal.

They are often praised as an entry level species that is significantly safer than other species of tarantulas due to them not being very defensive, not kicking irritating setae from their abdomen like most new world species, venom not being potent like some new world species and all old world species, and being more prone to bolting or using projectile defecation as a defense mechanism which is harmless by comparison of typical tarantula options. Although they may be one of if not the safest species to handle; handling is still not recommended due to their fast movements, frequency of jumping as an arboreal species that leaps between branches, and although they handle falls better than most species of tarantulas, falls are still potentially fatal since their abdomens will rupture from most impacts. On occasion; fast tarantulas may bolt out of their enclosures and onto their owners by mistake or after being disturbed, and they make good entry points for keepers to gain experience in dealing with fast moving tarantulas without much risk in the owner or their family members being bitten by a more toxic species such as those in Psalmopoeus and Poecilotheria.

== See also ==
- Antilles pinktoe tarantula
