= Avicularia metallica =

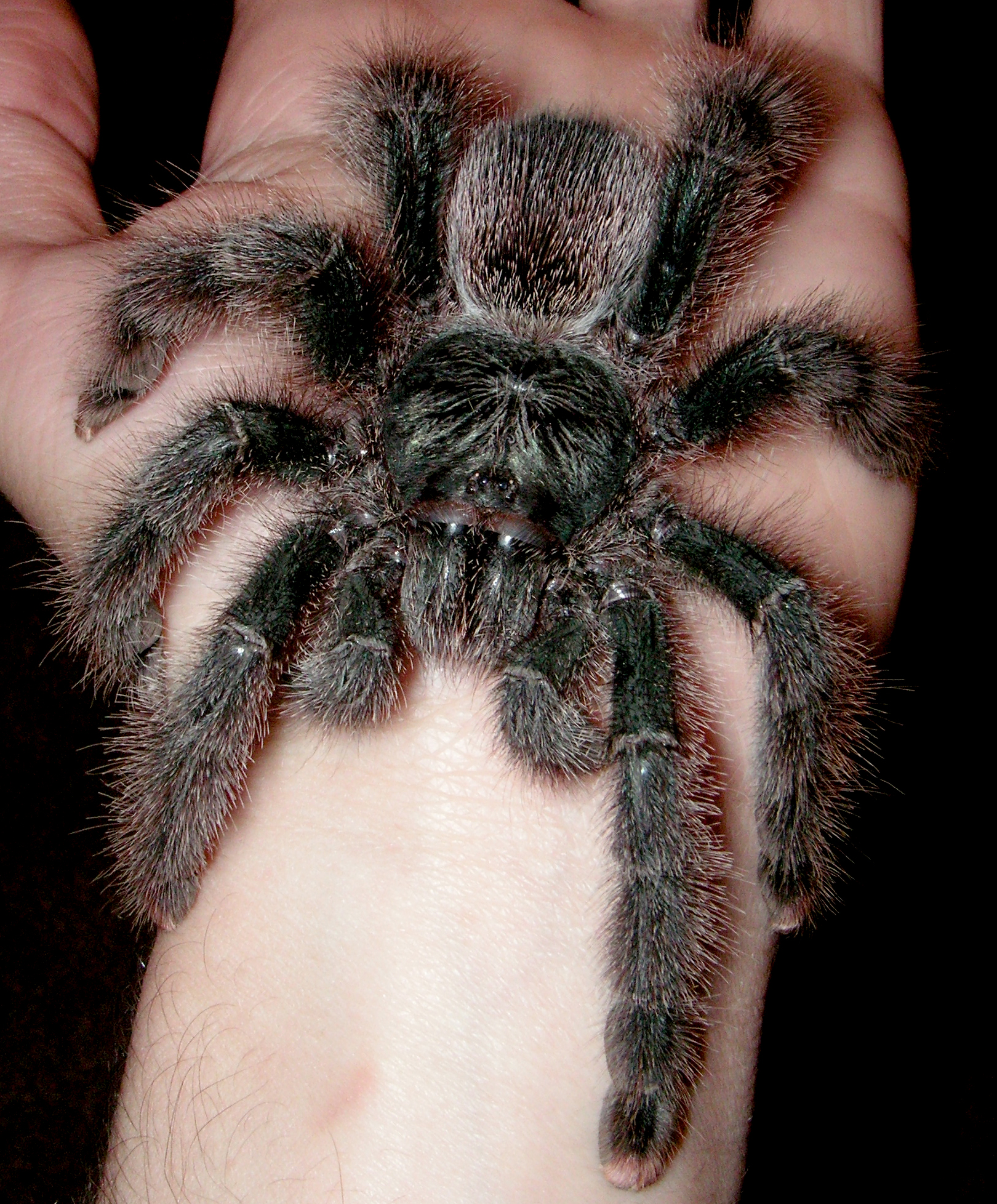

Avicularia metallica is considered to be a doubtful name (nomen dubium), and as of September 2018 was not accepted as a valid species by the World Spider Catalog.

A species is known by this name in the pet trade, where it may be called the whitetoe tarantula.
