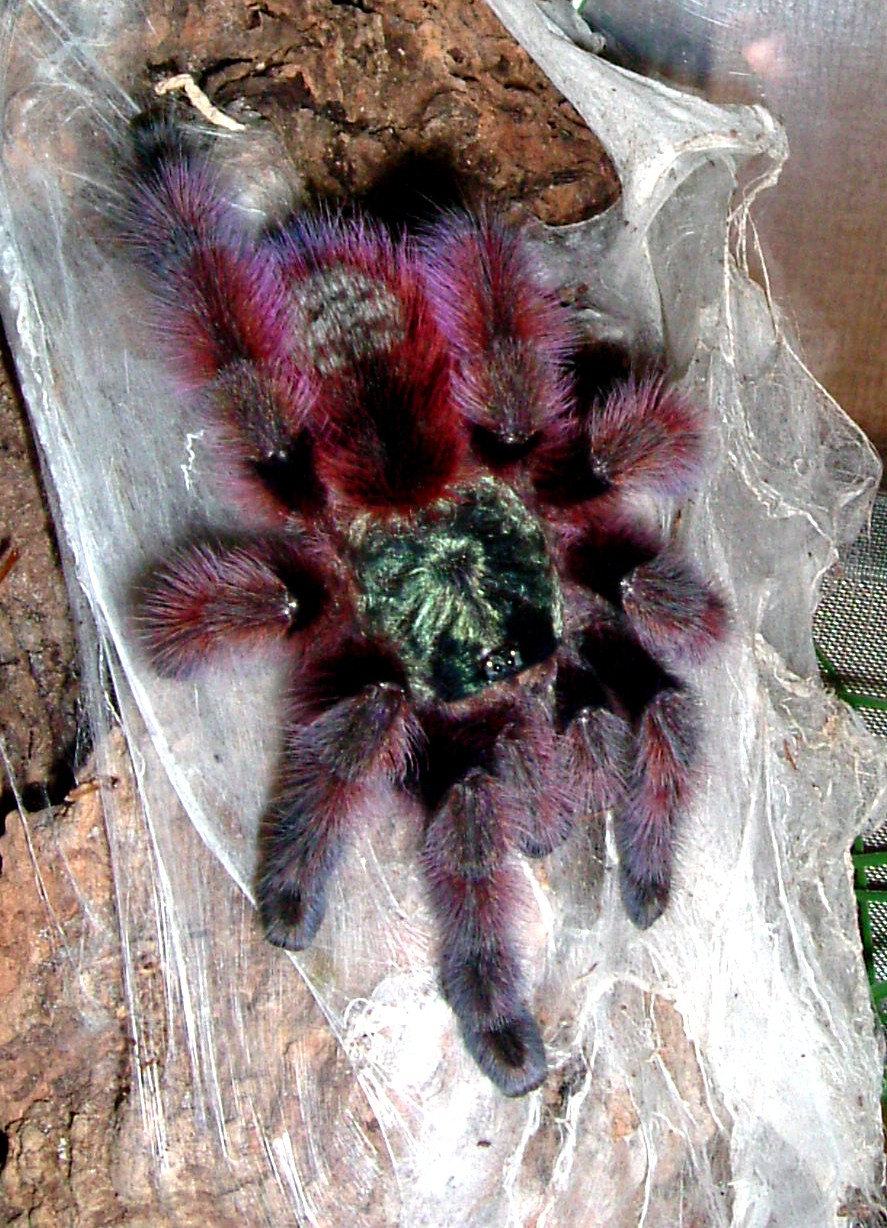

Conservation status
- CITES Appendix III

Scientific classification
- Kingdom: Animalia
- Phylum: Arthropoda
- Subphylum: Chelicerata
- Class: Arachnida
- Order: Araneae
- Infraorder: Mygalomorphae
- Family: Theraphosidae
- Genus: Caribena
- Species: C. versicolor

Binomial name
- Caribena versicolor (Walckenaer, 1837)

Synonyms
- Mygale versicolor Walckenaer, 1837; Avicularia rutilans Ausserer, 1875; Avicularia versicolor (Walckenaer, 1837)

= Antilles pinktoe tarantula =

Species of spider

The Antilles pinktoe tarantula (Caribena versicolor), also known as the Martinique red tree spider or the Martinique pinktoe, is a species of spider belonging to the family Theraphosidae, the tarantulas. This species was previously placed in the genus Avicularia, C. versicolor is native to Martinique in the Caribbean Sea.

Antilles pinktoe tarantulas are arboreal (tree-dwelling). They spin elaborate funnel webs in which they spend most of their time.

Spiderlings of C. versicolor are bright blue with a black tree trunk pattern on the abdomen. As they grow, they gradually lose their blue coloration; the carapace turns green, the abdomen red, and the legs turn green with pink tarsi and a covering of purple hairs. Males usually are slightly more brightly colored than females. As in most tarantula species, males do not grow as large as females, and their abdomens are smaller than those of females, even in proportion to their size.

== Taxonomy ==
Mygale versicolor was first described by Charles Athanase Walckenaer in 1837. In the description, Walckenaer used a female he said was from Guadeloupe and a male from Brazil. However, the two actually belong to different species. This causes nomenclatural problems, since when later workers synonymized Mygale versicolor or transferred it to another genus, they may have ultimately based their decisions on either the female or the male. Caroline Fukushima and Bertani in 2017 treated Mygale versicolor as the female specimen (actually believed to be from Martinique), designating a neotype. On this basis, it is synonymous with Avicularia rutilans. It was transferred to the genus Avicularia by Eugène Simon in 1892 and to the new genus Caribena in 2017.

== Distribution ==
The Antilles pinktoe tarantula is native to parts of the Lesser Antilles islands. It can be found on the island of Martinique.

== Gallery ==
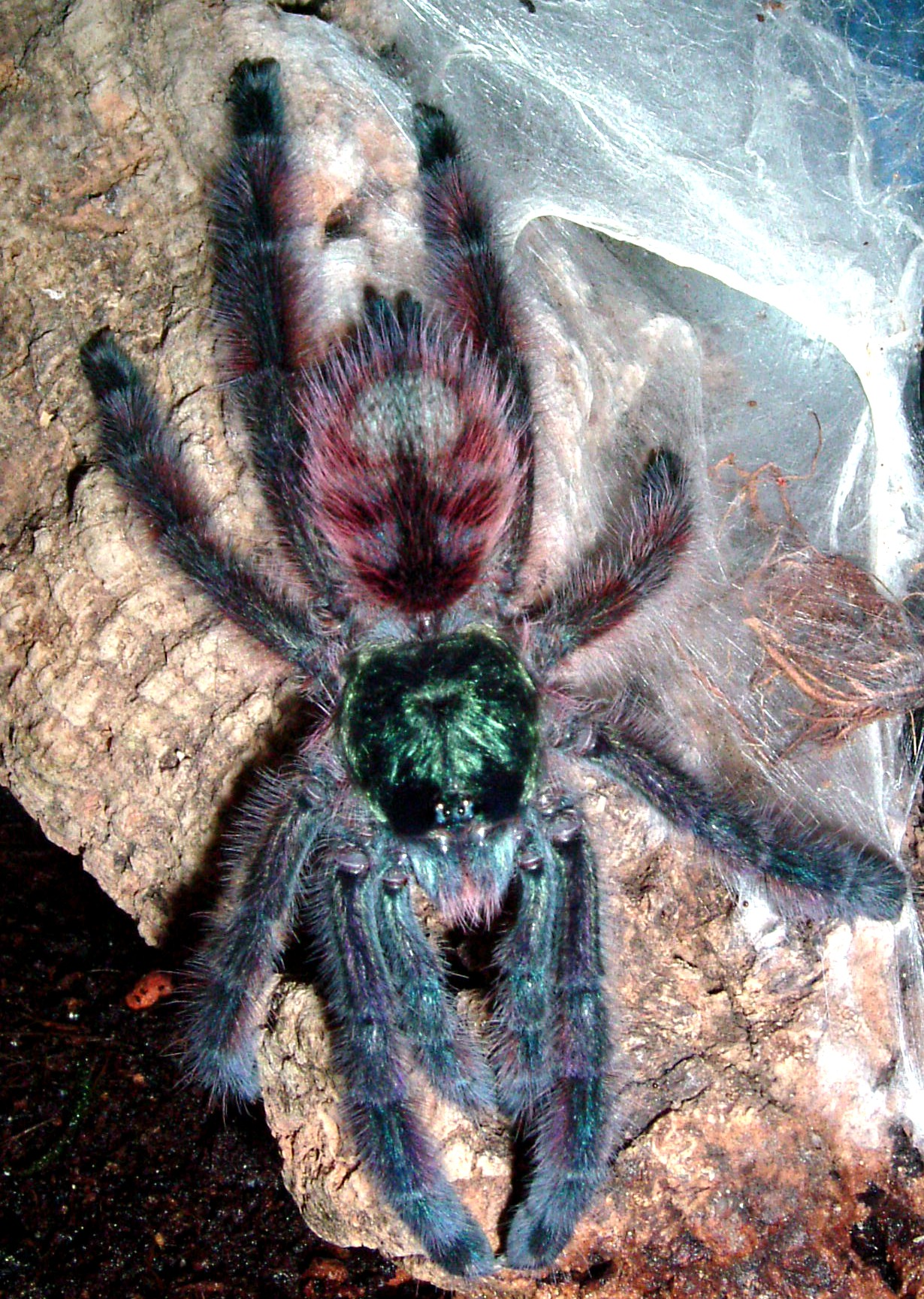

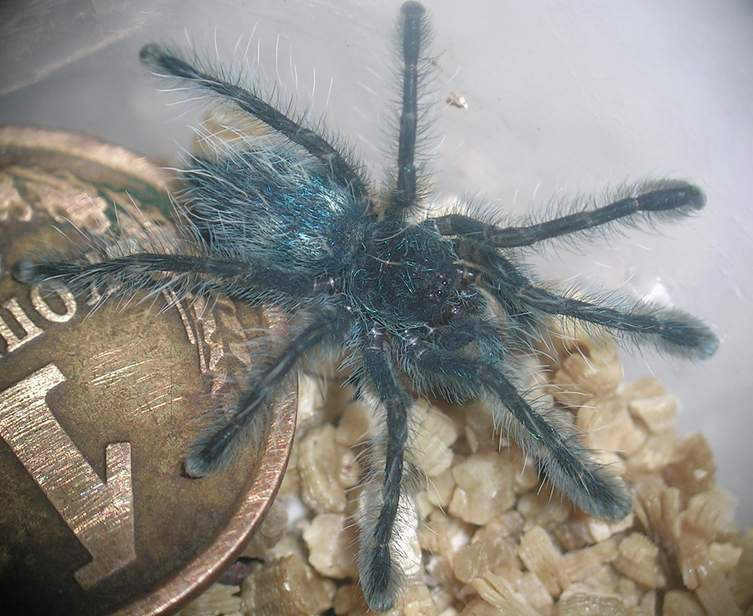
Versicolor baby is blue. Coin size at the background is 15mm in size.

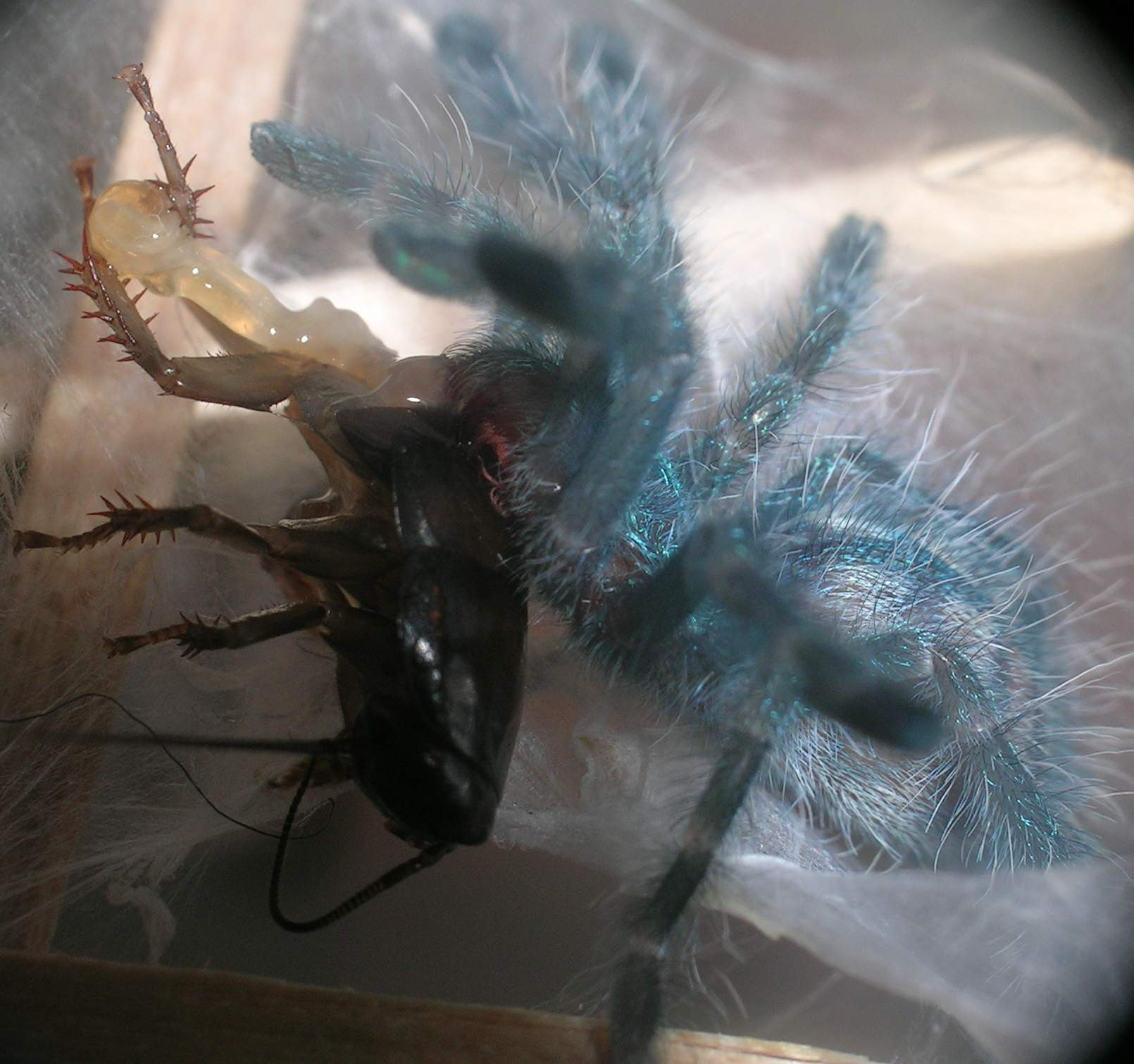
