= Brachypelma baumgarteni =

Conservation status
- Endangered (IUCN 3.1)
- CITES Appendix II

Scientific classification
- Kingdom: Animalia
- Phylum: Arthropoda
- Subphylum: Chelicerata
- Class: Arachnida
- Order: Araneae
- Infraorder: Mygalomorphae
- Family: Theraphosidae
- Genus: Brachypelma
- Species: B. baumgarteni

Binomial name
- Brachypelma baumgarteni Smith, 1993

Species of spider

Brachypelma baumgarteni (also called Mexican orange beauty) is a tarantula endemic to Pacific coast of Michoacan, Mexico.

== Description ==
It is similar to B. klaasi, but it has more reddish patellae. B. baumgarteni was thought to be a captive hybrid of B. smithi crossed with B. boehmei, because for a long time no specimen had been reported successfully bred in captivity. According to genetic analyses, its closest relative is B. boehmei.

== Distribution ==
The eastern border for its distribution is the river Balsas; the northern border is the Sierra Madre del Sur. It has a preference for tropical forest.

== Conservation ==
In 1985, Brachypelma smithi (then not distinguished from B. hamorii) was placed on CITES Appendix II, and in 1994, all remaining Brachypelma species were added, thus restricting international trade. Nevertheless, large numbers of tarantulas caught in the wild continue to be smuggled out of Mexico, including species of Brachypelma.
