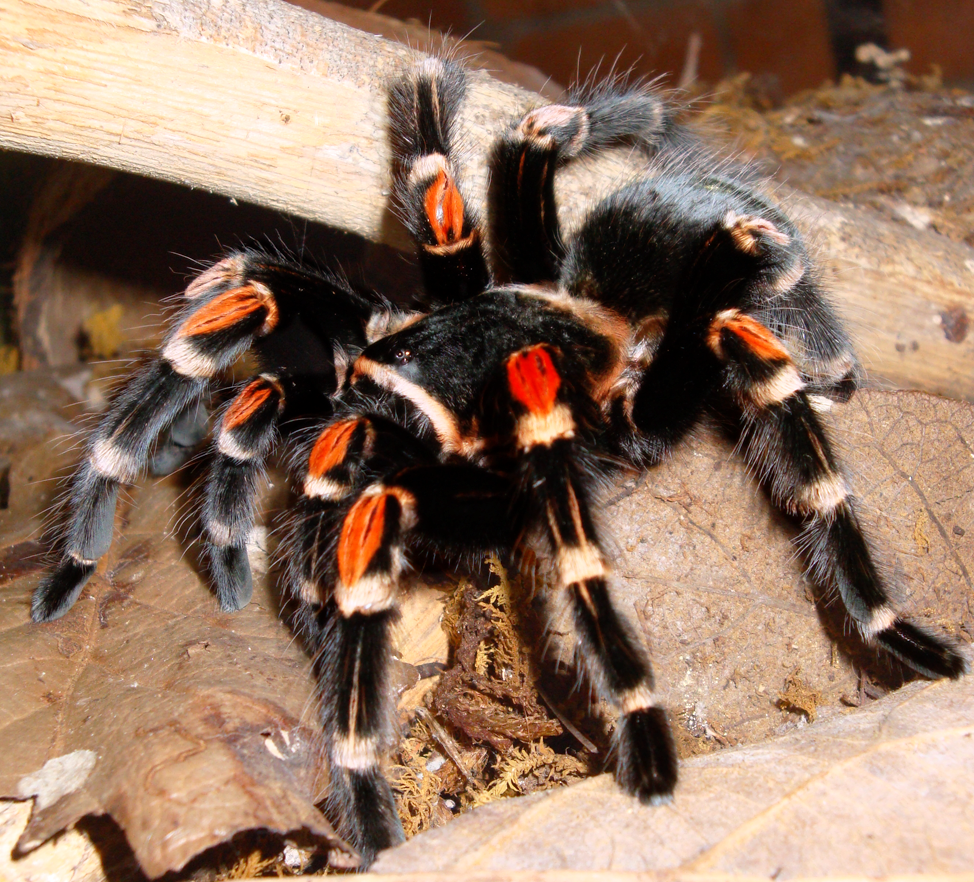

Conservation status
- CITES Appendix II

Scientific classification
- Kingdom: Animalia
- Phylum: Arthropoda
- Subphylum: Chelicerata
- Class: Arachnida
- Order: Araneae
- Infraorder: Mygalomorphae
- Family: Theraphosidae
- Genus: Brachypelma
- Species: B. auratum

Binomial name
- Brachypelma auratum Schmidt, 1992
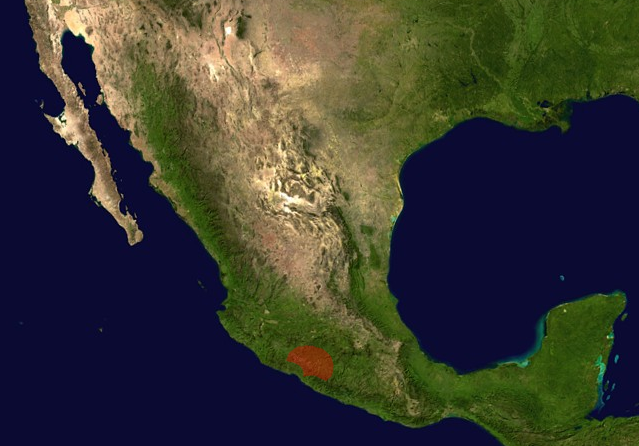
- Distribution of B. auratum

= Brachypelma auratum =

Species of spider

Brachypelma auratum (also called Mexican flame knee) is a tarantula endemic to the regions of Guerrero and Michoacán in Mexico. In appearance it is reminiscent of the quintessential Mexican red-kneed spider, Brachypelma smithi, albeit darker and with more discrete red striations on the patella. The form of these red markings have earned the spider its common name, the flame knee. Due to the species' similarities to B. smithi, it was not considered a distinct species until 1992. It has been found living communally with a small frog known as Eleutherodactylus occidentalis

== Conservation ==
In 1985, Brachypelma smithi (then not distinguished from B. hamorii) was placed on CITES Appendix II, and in 1994, all remaining Brachypelma species were added, thus restricting trade. Nevertheless, large numbers of tarantulas caught in the wild continue to be smuggled out of Mexico, including species of Brachypelma.

== See also ==
- Tarantula § The element pelma in genus names
