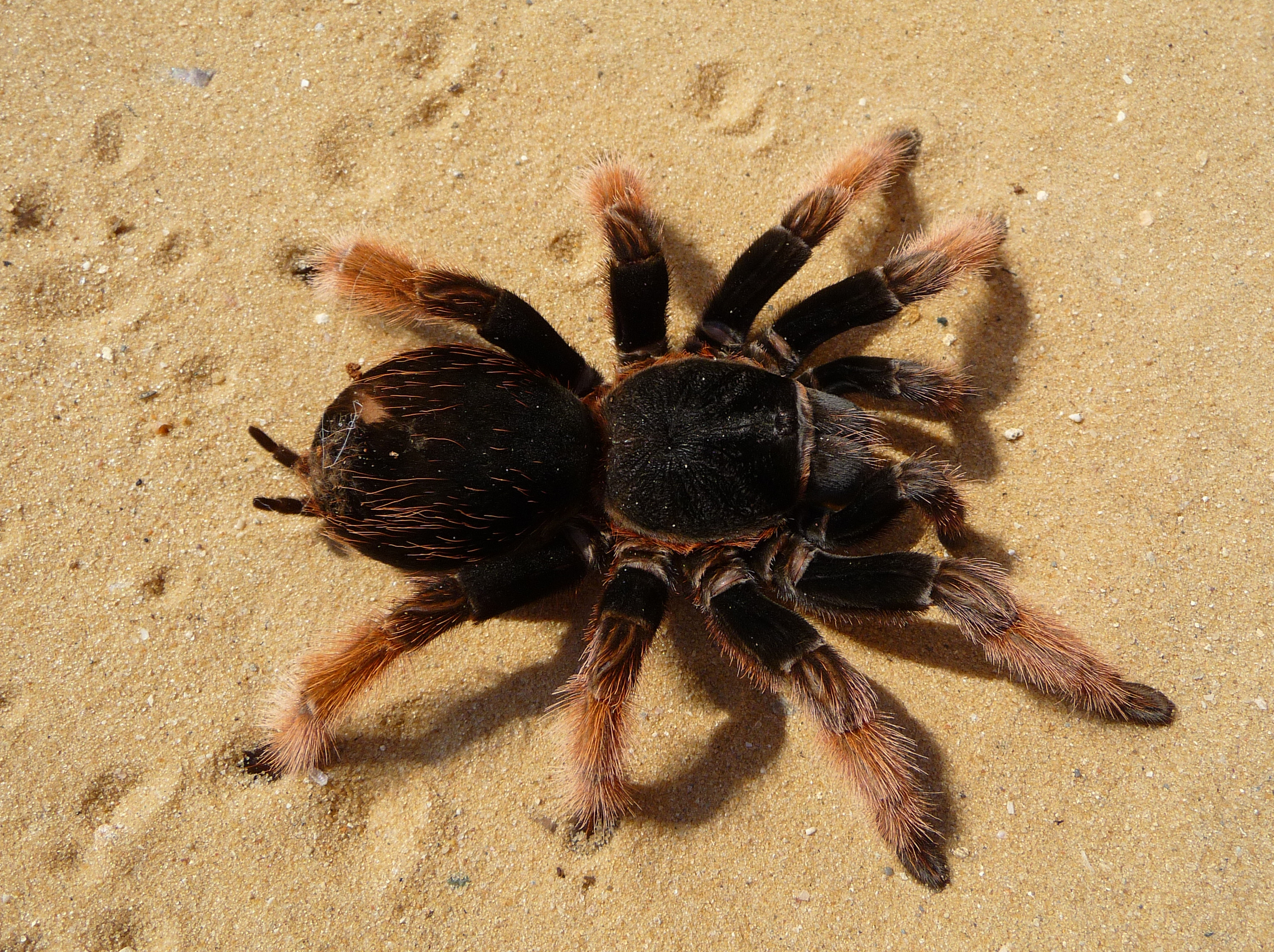

Conservation status
- Near Threatened (IUCN 3.1)
- CITES Appendix II

Scientific classification
- Kingdom: Animalia
- Phylum: Arthropoda
- Subphylum: Chelicerata
- Class: Arachnida
- Order: Araneae
- Infraorder: Mygalomorphae
- Family: Theraphosidae
- Genus: Brachypelma
- Species: B. klaasi

Binomial name
- Brachypelma klaasi (Schmidt & Krause, 1994)

Synonyms
- Brachypelmides klaasi Schmidt & Krause, 1994

= Brachypelma klaasi =

Species of spider

Brachypelma klaasi (also known as the Mexican pink tarantula) is a tarantula endemic to Mexico and the rarest of the genus Brachypelma.

== Appearance ==
The setae of this species have a uniformly rusty appearance. The coloration is very similar to that of the six species of Brachypelma that are endemic to the west coast. B. boehmei is similar, having black tarsi, orange-yellow metatarsi, tibias and patellas, black femora and coxae and orange-yellow hairs on the opistosoma. It differs only in the carapace, which is yellow-orange in B. boehmei and black in B. klaasi. Another very similar species is B. baumgarteni. Adults of B. klaasi have a body length of about 6–7.5 cm with a 16 cm legspan.

== Distribution ==
B. klaasi is found at elevations of 300–1400 m above sea level on the western slopes of the Sierra Madre Occidental and some areas on the western limits of the Trans-Mexican Volcanic Belt in Jalisco and Nayarit states. Its known range extends from Tepic, Nayarit, in the north to Chamela, Jalisco, in the south, with the largest known population at the biological reserve at Chamela.

== Conservation ==
There is a high rate of collection for the pet trade of B. klaasi and other members of the genus Brachypelma. As such, all members of Brachypelma have been placed on Appendix II of CITES. B. klaasi is considered to be the rarest and most threatened of the Mexican tarantula species. Their slow growth, combined with habitat degradation and illegal wild capture for the pet trade means that it is estimated that less than 0.1% of individual tarantulas survive from egg to adulthood in the wild. Temperature and humidity may influence the survival and development of eggs and spiderlings, and appear to be more important in governing the distribution of B. klaasi than are food resources or intra-specific interactions.
