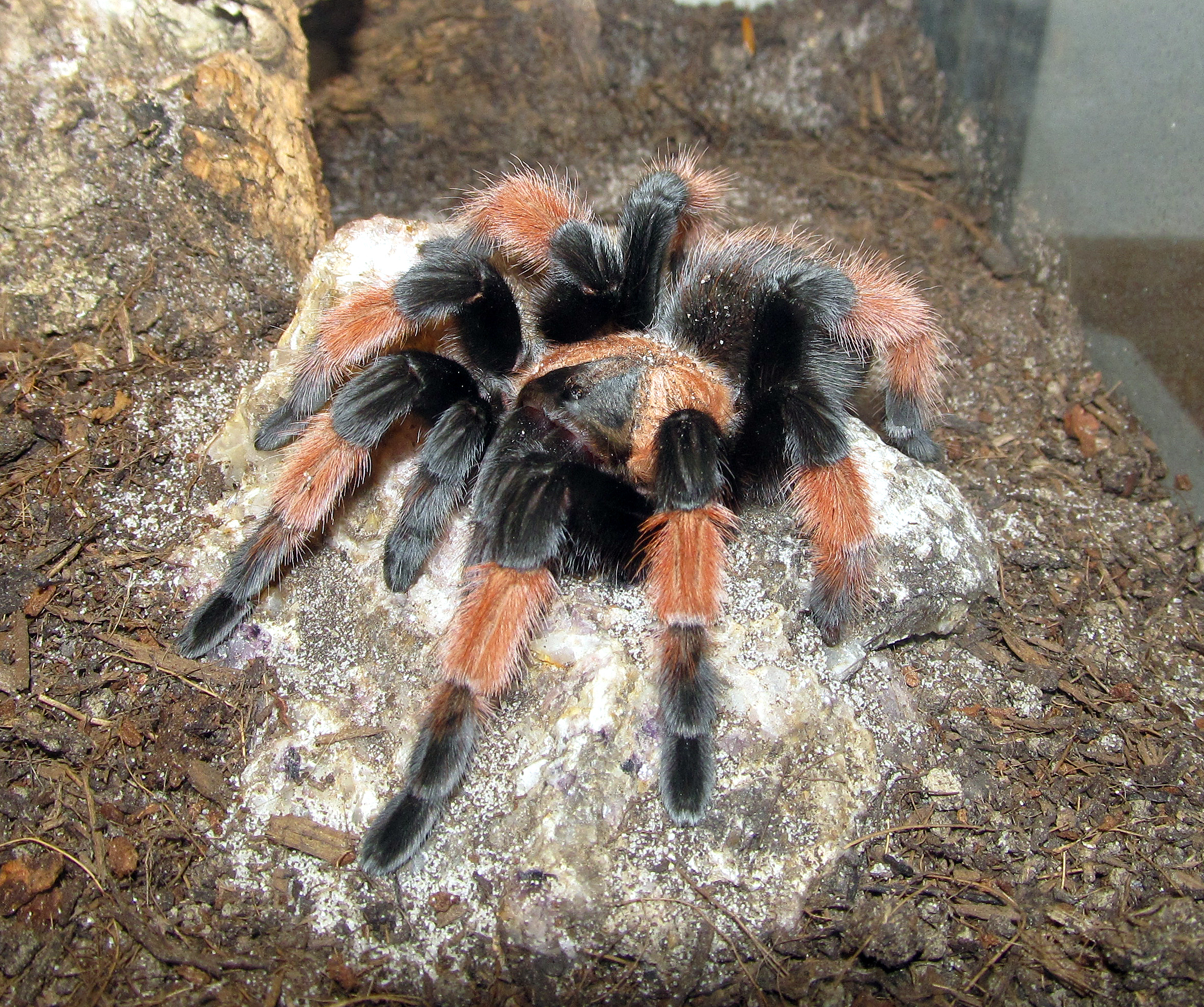
- Juvenile male B. emilia, in captivity

Scientific classification
- Kingdom: Animalia
- Phylum: Arthropoda
- Subphylum: Chelicerata
- Class: Arachnida
- Order: Araneae
- Infraorder: Mygalomorphae
- Family: Theraphosidae
- Genus: Brachypelma; Simon, 1891

Species
- See text

Diversity
- 18 species

Synonyms
- Brachypelmides Schmidt & Krause, 1994

= Brachypelma =

Genus of spiders

Brachypelma is a genus of spiders in the family Theraphosidae (tarantulas). They may have bodies up to 6 cm (2 1/4 in) long with legs of similar or greater lengths. Some species have brightly colored legs, with red or orange marks and rings.

The taxonomy of the genus and its species has been the subject of considerable debate. In 2020, the genus was split, with a group of species (the "red rump" tarantulas) being moved to a new genus, Tliltocatl. As now circumscribed, the genus Brachypelma is found only in Mexico. Many species of both genera are popular with tarantula keepers as pets; the females in particular are long lived. All species are protected, and trade is regulated under CITES. Although they are bred in captivity, they continue to be exported in large numbers. Members of the reduced genus Brachypelma (the "red leg" group) are considered to be in most urgent need of further conservation efforts.

== Description ==
Members of the family Theraphosidae, the tarantulas, to which Brachypelma belongs, are generally large compared to other spiders, and are commonly seen as "objects of dread". Tarantulas do not use webs for capturing their prey, relying on their venom and their size and strength. Brachypelma species are noted for their large size, colorfulness and docility in captivity. Larger species of Brachypelma, such as B. smithi, have body lengths in the approximate range 45–60 mm (1 3/4–2 1/4 in) with legs up to 70 mm (2 3/4 in) long. Females on average have longer bodies than males but shorter legs.

Species have bright red markings on their legs. B. boehmei has been described as the "most gorgeous" species of the genus. The parts of the legs closest to the body are black, then three segments (the patellae, tibiae and metatarsi) are bright orange-yellow, followed by black tarsi. Although brightly colored, Brachypelma species are cryptic when in their native habitat.

=== Diagnosis ===
The distribution of hairs on the legs and palp and the shape of the male and female genitalia are the diagnostic features of the genus. In common with species of Tliltocatl, the prolateral (forward facing) surface of the trochanter and femur of the first leg and the retrolateral surface of the pedipalp have plumose hairs, and there is no pad of plumose hairs on the femur of the fourth leg. The male palpal bulb has a flattened, spoon-shaped embolus; females have fused spermathecae, with a flat cross-section. Brachypelma can be distinguished from Tliltocatl by presence of the red or orange patterns on the legs of all species except B. albiceps, which can be recognized by the golden yellow carapace. Brachypelma species lack spines on the patellae of the pedipalps and legs, unlike Tliltocatl species. The shape of the genitalia differs between the genera; the apex of the male palpal bulb is shorter in Brachypelma and the female spermatheca baseplate is more strongly developed and hardened.

Comparison of typical Brachypelma and Tliltocatl species

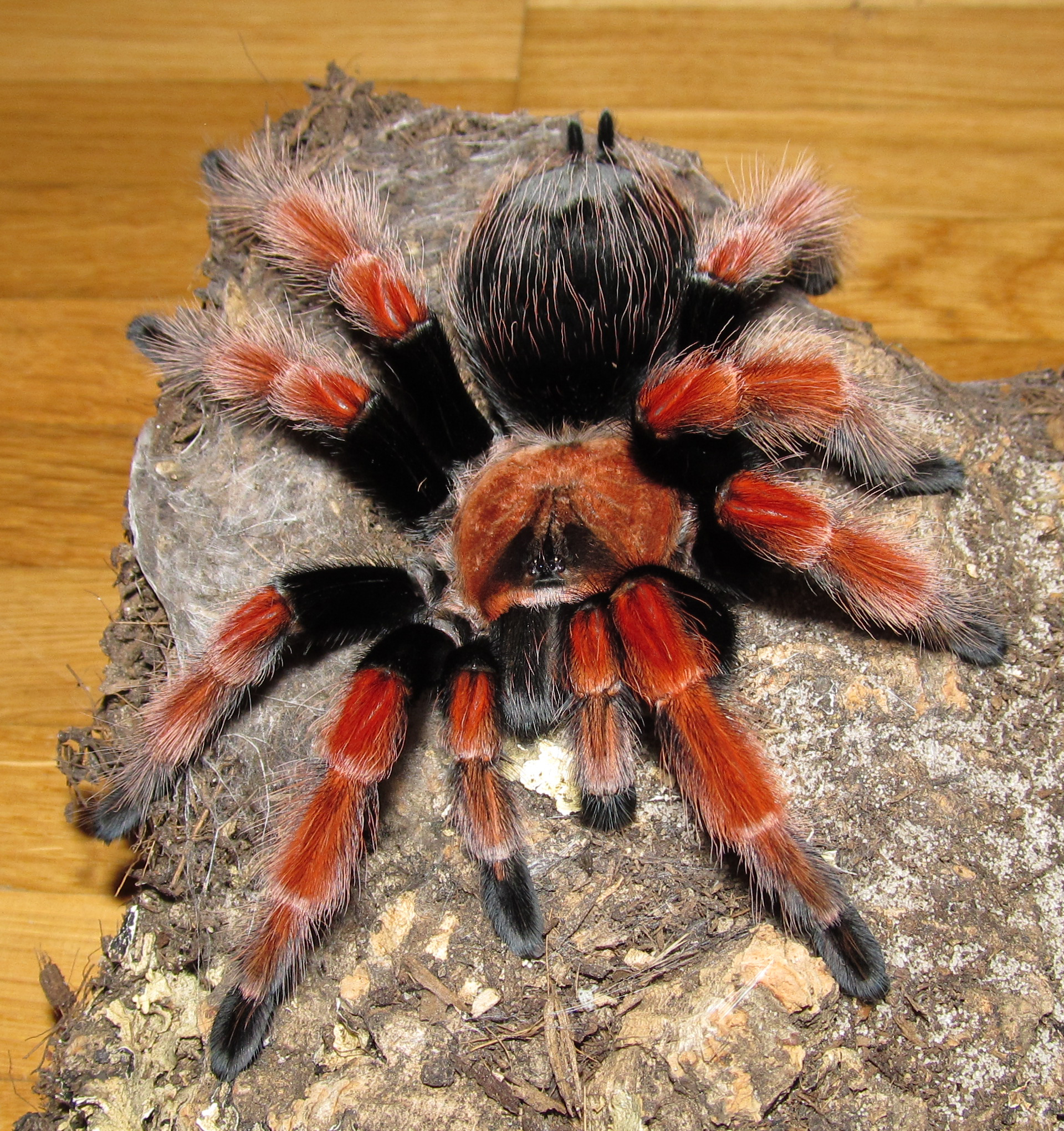
Brachypelma boehmei

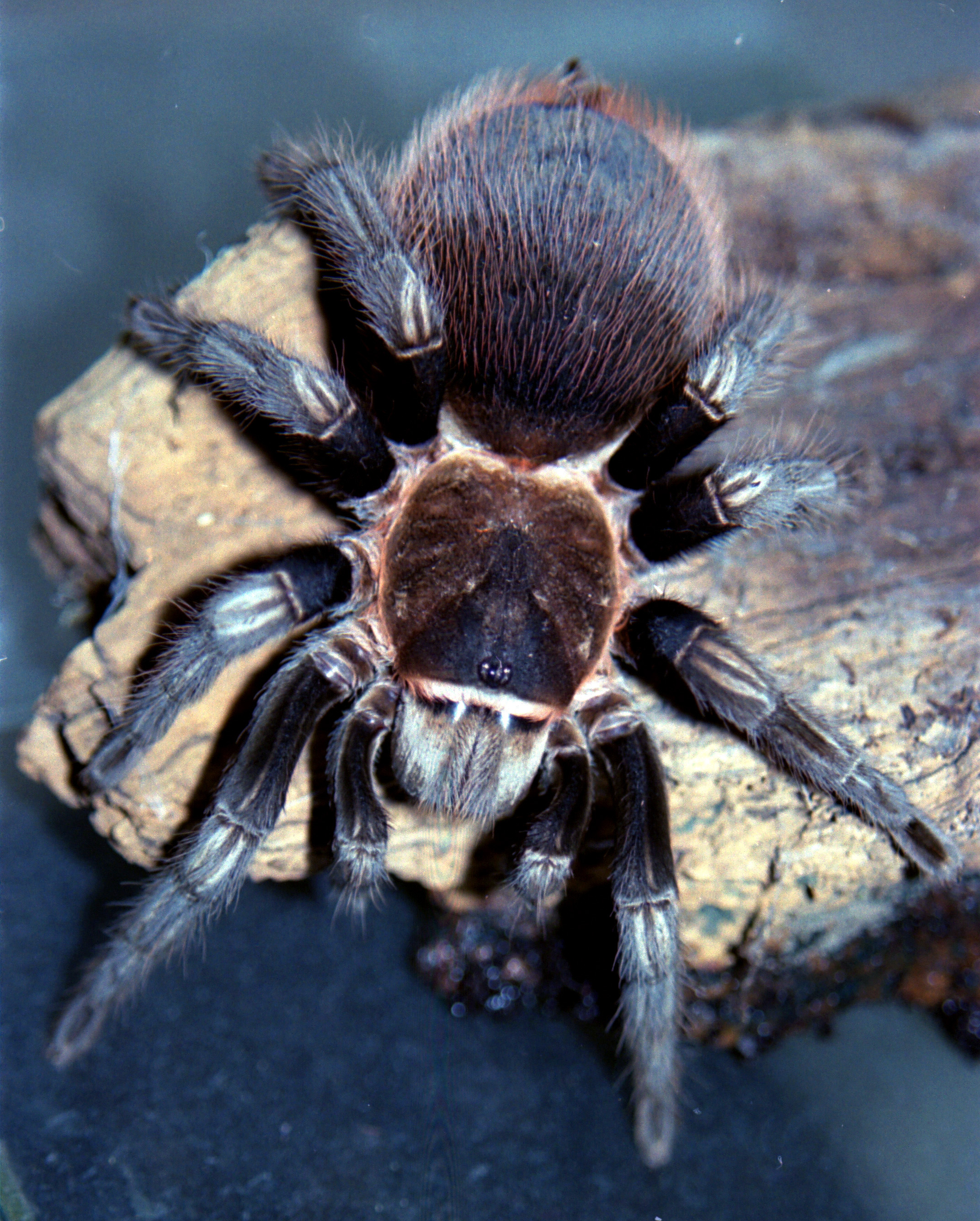
Tliltocatl cf. sabulosum

== Life history ==
All the species of Brachypelma that have been studied in detail live in burrows. These have a single entrance, a little larger than the spider, opening into a horizontal tunnel that usually leads to two chambers: one where it molts and one where it rests and consumes its prey. The entrance is blocked with material, such as soil and leaves, bound together by silk when the spider is inactive for significant length of time; otherwise the entrance is open with some silk visible. North American tarantulas like Brachypelma are "sit and wait" predators, seizing prey passing by the burrow entrance.

Compared to related genera, Brachypelma species are long-lived. The maximum life-span recorded in two Berlin zoos was 12 years for Brachypelma annitha (now a synonym of B. smithi). In the wild, females take around 9–10 years to reach maturity, but can then live for another 10 years. Males can take 7–8 years to reach maturity, afterwards usually dying within a year, probably because when mature they actively seek mates and rarely feed while doing so, whereas females remain around their burrows.

Studies on species in the wild showed that pre-adult and adult spiders molt towards the end of the dry season, which lasts from June to November. After their last molt, adult males search for females, travelling in the daytime, particularly in the morning and evening. Females produce an egg sac before they molt. The eggs hatch a few weeks before the rainy season begins. The spiderlings molt every two weeks for the first few months, then less frequently as they mature. A full-grown Brachypelma may molt as infrequently as once a year.

== Taxonomy ==
The genus Brachypelma was erected by Eugène Simon in 1891 for the species Mygale emilia, originally described in 1856. Brachypelma is derived from the Greek βραχύϛ (brachys), meaning 'short' and πέλμα (pelma) meaning 'the sole of the foot'. However, arachnologists have conventionally taken pelma to refer to the tarsal scopula, producing the overall meaning '(with) short scopula'. (See also Tarantula § The element pelma in genus names.)

The genus has not always been recognized. In 1897, Frederick Pickard-Cambridge considered Brachypelma to be a synonym of Eurypelma, regarding the two as not distinct from one another. (Eurypelma is now a synonym of Avicularia.) In 1903, Reginald Pocock recognized Brachypelma, listing four species and noting that there were more. Other arachnologists, like Robert Raven in his 1985 monograph of Mygalomorphae, treated Brachypelma as a synonym of Euathlus. In 1992, Günter Schmidt clarified the difference between Euathlus and Brachypelma, resulting in the latter's acceptance as a distinct genus.

The genus Brachypelmides, erected by Schmidt and Krause in 1994, is considered a synonym of Brachypelma by some sources, including the World Spider Catalog, although this has been rejected by Schmidt. When broadly defined, Brachypelma is distinguished from related genera by the plumose setae (hairs) on the prolateral (forward-facing) side of the trochanter and femur of the first leg and on the retrolateral (outward-facing) side of the pedipalp.

A 2017 study concluded that the genus Brachypelma as then circumscribed was not monophyletic, and that only eight "red leg" species belong in Brachypelma sensu stricto, the remaining species (the "red rump" group) being misplaced. In 2020, they were transferred to the new genus Tliltocatl.

=== DNA barcoding ===
In 2017, Mendoza and Francke applied DNA barcoding to some Mexican species of Brachypelma. In this approach, a portion of about 650 base pairs of the mitochondrial gene cytochrome oxidase I (COI) is used, primarily to identify existing species, but also sometimes to support a separation between species. One cladogram resulting from the DNA barcodes is shown below. Although B. hamorii and B. smithi are very similar in external appearance and have not always been treated as separate species, they are clearly distinguished by their DNA barcodes. All the species in the cladogram below belong to Brachypelma sensu stricto (the "red leg" group).

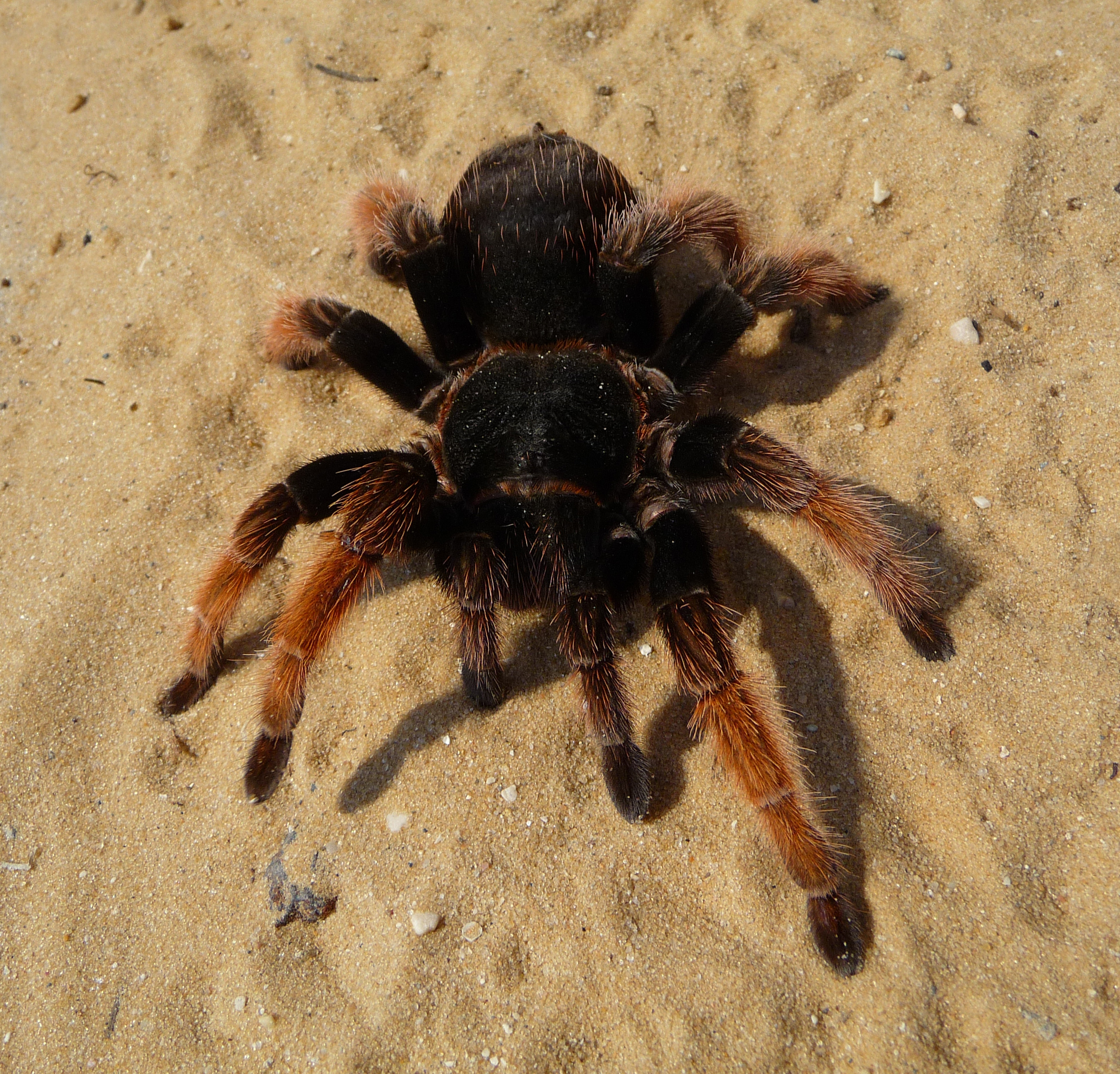
Brachypelma klaasi

- - Brachypelma klaasi
  - - Brachypelma albiceps
    - - Brachypelma hamorii
      - - Brachypelma smithi
        - - Brachypelma auratum
          - Brachypelma baumgarteni
          - Brachypelma boehmei

=== Phylogeny ===
In 2017, Steven Turner and colleagues reported on a phylogenetic analysis of the family Theraphosidae based on mitochondrial DNA. A cladogram based on Bayesian analysis of a sample within their proposed tribe Theraphosini is shown below, with current genus names added.

- - - other genera, including Aphonopelma groups 3 and 4
    - - - Citharacanthus
        - Crassicrus
      - - Aphonopelma group 2
        - "Red rump" Brachypelma = Tliltocatl
  - - - Xenesthis
      - Pamphobeteus
    - - "Red leg" Brachypelma = Brachypelma s.s.
      - Aphonopelma group 1

The cladogram shows that the genus Brachypelma as then circumscribed was not monophyletic, but fell into two distinct clades. All analyses supported the view that Brachypelma (along with Aphonopelma) was made up of deeply divergent subgroups. Detailed analysis further suggested that the species in the "red rump" group were closely related, with several supposed species, particularly those labeled "Brachypelma vagans" (now Tliltocatl vagans) not being monophyletic. The authors cautioned that the necessary use of specimens obtained through the commercial pet trade meant that their exact geographical origins were often unknown, leading to uncertainty as to their identification. Subsequently, a new genus Tliltocatl, was erected for the "red rump" group.

=== Species ===
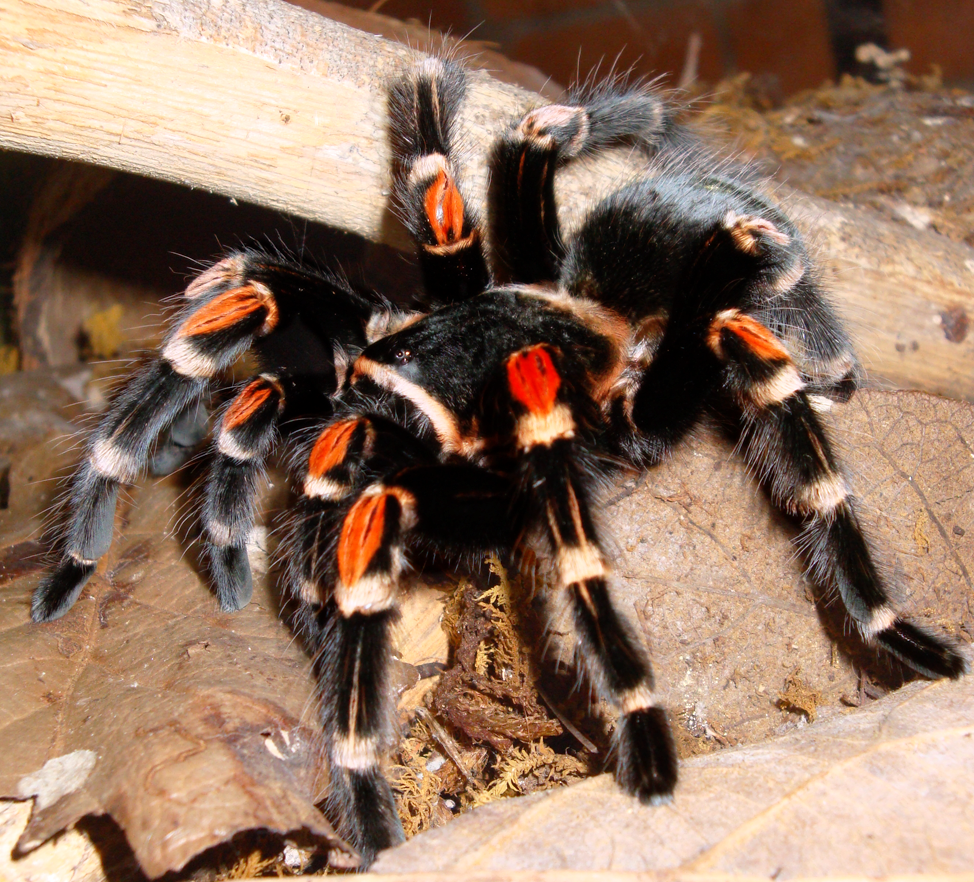
Brachypelma auratum

As of March 2020, the World Spider Catalog accepted only the species listed below. All other species formerly placed in Brachypelma have been transferred to other genera, most to Tliltocatl.

- Brachypelma albiceps Pocock, 1903 – Mexico
- Brachypelma auratum Schmidt, 1992 – Mexico
- Brachypelma baumgarteni Smith, 1993 – Mexico
- Brachypelma boehmei Schmidt & Klaas, 1993 – Mexico
- Brachypelma emilia (White, 1856) (type species) – Mexico
- Brachypelma hamorii Tesmoingt, Cleton & Verdez, 1997 – Mexico
- Brachypelma klaasi (Schmidt & Krause, 1994) – Mexico
- Brachypelma smithi (F. O. Pickard-Cambridge, 1897) – Mexico

Two species have been moved to the genus Sericopelma:

- Brachypelma angustum Valerio, 1980 → Sericopelma angustum
- Brachypelma embrithes (Chamberlin & Ivie, 1936) → Sericopelma embrithes

== Distribution ==
Distribution of Brachypelma species according to Locht et al. (1999)

All the species remaining in Brachypelma are found in Mexico. Within Mexico, the largest number of species are found along the Pacific coast. The majority of species are restricted to small endemic ranges in this area.

There is uncertainty over both the distribution of some Brachypelma species and their identity. Stuart Longhorn has criticized several arachnologists, including Günter Schmidt, for describing new species based on pet-trade specimens without accurate locations, resulting in vague or inaccurate distributions. He argues that locality information is vital for "scientific rigor", since without it important questions relating to the identity of species cannot be answered. Steven Turner and colleagues have also noted difficulties in identification resulting from the use of imprecisely sourced pet-trade specimens.

== Conservation ==
Habitat destruction and collection for the pet trade have led to these spiders being among the few arthropods protected under international Convention on International Trade of Endangered Species rules. In 1985, B. smithi (then not distinguished from B. hamorii) was placed on CITES Appendix II, and in 1994, all remaining Brachypelma species were added. Large numbers of Mexican tarantulas caught in the wild continue to be smuggled out of Mexico. It is reported that at least 3,000 specimens of Mexican tarantulas were sent to the United States or Europe a few years prior to 2017, most of which were Mexican red knee tarantulas (B. hamorii and B. smithi). Turner and colleagues suggest that members of Brachypelma s.s. (their "red leg" group), which have small ranges and are slow to mature and reproduce, should be the focus of urgent conservation measures, with threats to species in the genus Tliltocatl (their "red rump" group) possibly being downgraded.

== In captivity ==
Brachypelma species are docile tarantulas which are easy to keep in a terrarium. The best-known species in this genus are the Mexican red knee tarantulas B. hamorii and B. smithi, as well as B. boehmi, the Mexican fireleg. They feed on smaller invertebrates and occasionally vertebrates, but while insects are the norm, they may also eat lizards or frogs. These species, like most tarantulas, are cannibalistic, so in captivity, individuals must be kept alone, though brief captive introductions of a mate for breeding purposes can prove unproblematic, so long as they are separated once mating has occurred.

Large spiders used in Hollywood movies (e.g., Indiana Jones series, The Mummy Returns) are often Brachypelma hamorii or Brachypelma emilia because they are very docile, though the much less expensive and only moderately more aggressive Chilean rose tarantula is frequently used, as well. While it is almost unheard of for a Brachypelma to bite a human, they are quick to kick urticating hairs in self-defense, though their hairs can be less irritating than those of other species, especially the goliath birdeater.

== See also ==
- Pinktoe tarantula
- Chilean rose tarantula
- Avicularia
- Goliath birdeater
- Brazilian whiteknee tarantula
- Cobalt blue tarantula
