= Mexican redknee tarantula =

Mexican redknee tarantula is a common name for several spiders and may refer to:

- Brachypelma hamorii
- Brachypelma smithi
