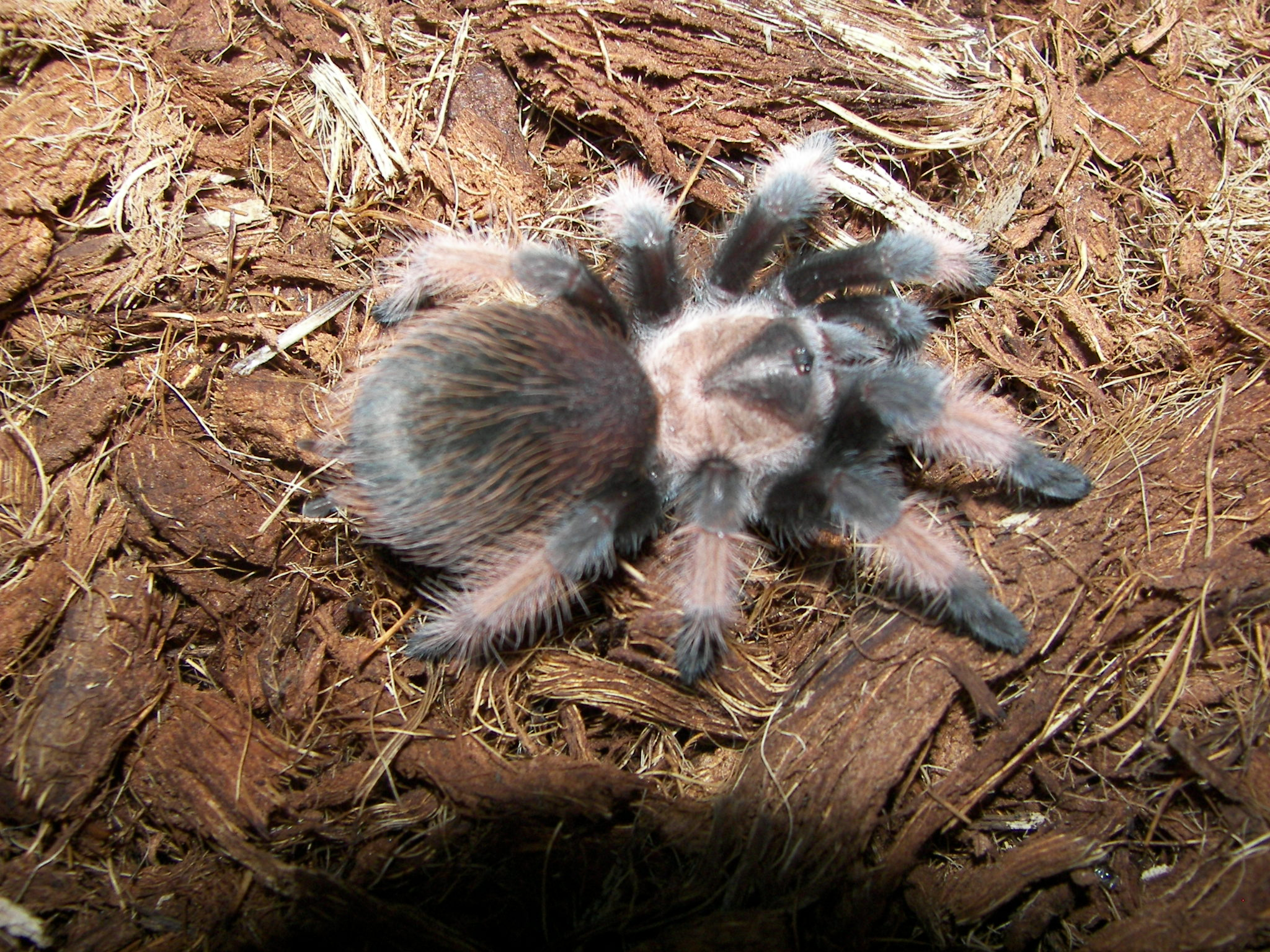
- Mexican redleg tarantula
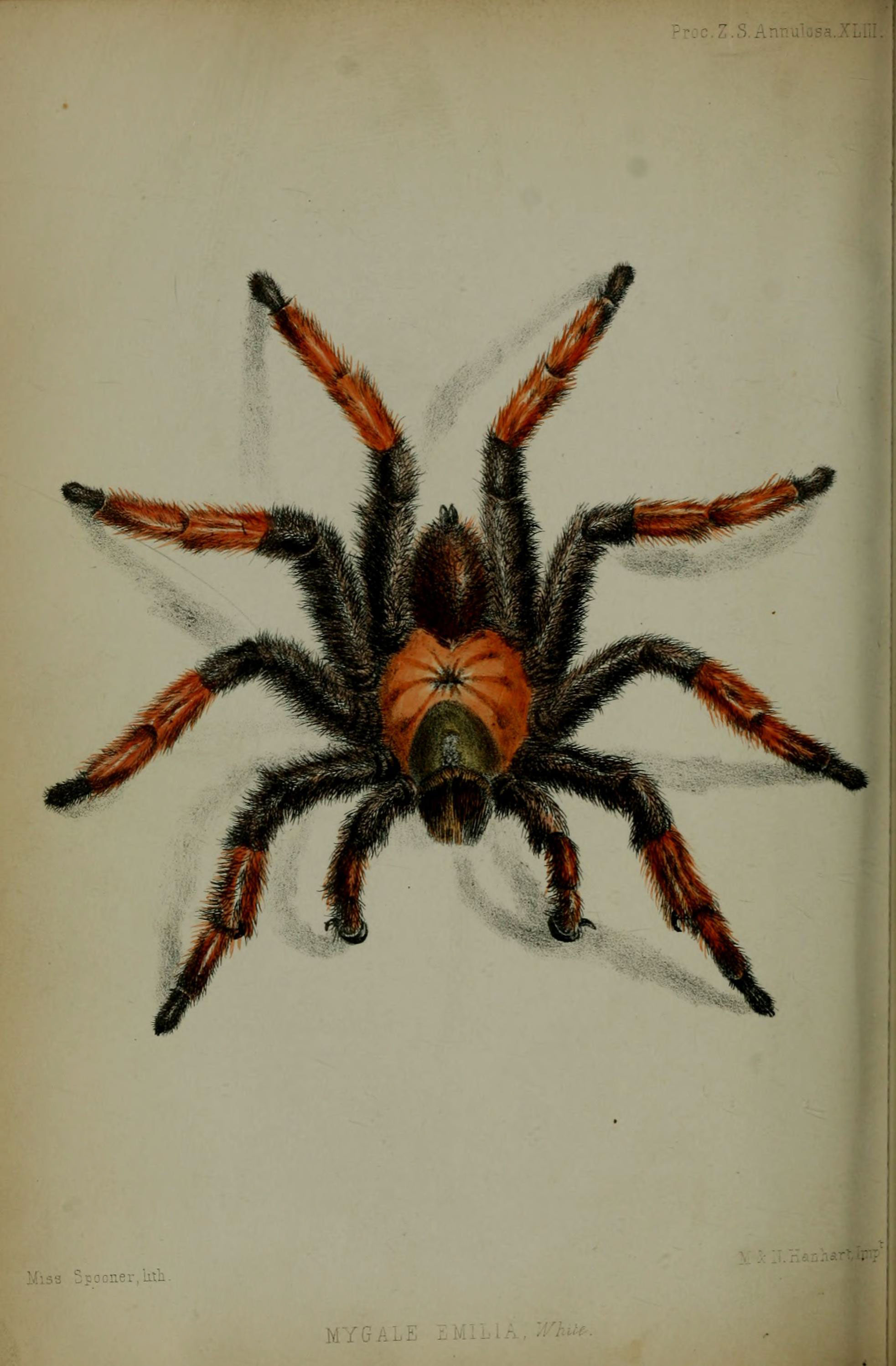
- Plate LXIII

Conservation status
- CITES Appendix II

Scientific classification
- Kingdom: Animalia
- Phylum: Arthropoda
- Subphylum: Chelicerata
- Class: Arachnida
- Order: Araneae
- Infraorder: Mygalomorphae
- Family: Theraphosidae
- Genus: Brachypelma
- Species: B. emilia

Binomial name
- Brachypelma emilia (White, 1856)
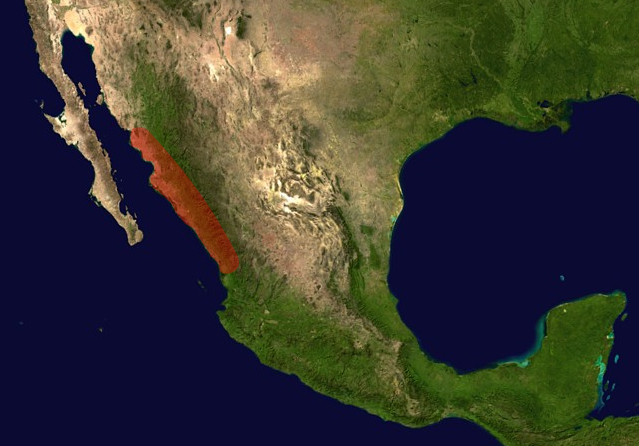
- Distribution of B. emilia.

Synonyms
- Mygale emilia White, 1856; Brachypelma aemilia (White, 1856), orth. var.; Eurypelma emilia (White, 1856); Euathlus emilia (White, 1856)

= Brachypelma emilia =

Species of spider

The Mexican redleg or red-legged tarantula (Brachypelma emilia) is a species of terrestrial tarantula closely related to the famous Mexican redknee tarantula. Like the redknee it is a docile tarantula and popular in the pet trade. It is slow growing and, like many tarantulas, females can live for decades.

== Description ==
The Mexican redleg, also known as the red-legged tarantula, has a dark-colored body with the second joint of its legs being pink, red or orange. Its carapace is light colored with a distinctive black triangle at the front. Following moulting, the colors are more pronounced.

An adult female has a body roughly 65 mm long, with a legspan of 12.5 cm, and a weight of approximately 15 to 16 grams.

White described it as follows:

Deep blackish-brown; the basal joint of chelicera with some scattered red hairs in front; the cephalothorax of a rich yellowish-red, the hairs short, close and velvet-like; the fourth and fifth joints of the legs clothed with yellowish-red hairs, the end of the fifth joint with many brown hairs; fourth joint of the first pair of legs, with the curiously hooked process near the end, also covered with red hairs, the under side of the fifth and sixth joints and the tarsi clothed with a close, dense, velvet pad. Body brown, with longish, scattered red hairs, which are deeper in hue than on the other parts.

== Conservation ==
All species of Brachypelma were placed on CITES Appendix II in 1994, thus restricting trade. Nevertheless, large numbers of tarantulas caught in the wild continue to be smuggled out of Mexico, including species of Brachypelma. (However, the trade in B. emilia largely involves captive-bred spiderlings.)

In Mexico, the species is listed as "threatened".

== Distribution ==
This species is found in the foothills of the Sierra Madre Occidental in Sinaloa and Nayarit in Mexico.

== In captivity ==
The Mexican redleg is a mostly docile species, perhaps more so even than the redknee. That, coupled with its coloration, and impressive size, makes it a very popular pet species. As such it is considered to be threatened by capture for sale to the pet trade.

It is very reluctant to bite when distressed, but possesses urticating hair and will flick these if it feels threatened.

== Taxonomy ==
It was first described in 1856 by Scottish zoologist Adam White as Mygale Emilia, but in 1891 Eugene Simon transferred it to the new genus, Brachypelma, making B .emilia the type species.
