= Sericopelma angustum =

Conservation status
- CITES Appendix II

Scientific classification
- Kingdom: Animalia
- Phylum: Arthropoda
- Subphylum: Chelicerata
- Class: Arachnida
- Order: Araneae
- Infraorder: Mygalomorphae
- Family: Theraphosidae
- Genus: Sericopelma
- Species: S. angustum

Binomial name
- Sericopelma angustum Valerio, 1980

Species of spider

Sericopelma angustum, is a species of spider in the family Theraphosidae found in Costa Rica The species was formerly included in the genus Brachypelma.

Since at least the early 1990s some pet-trade animals have been exchanged under the name Brachypelma angustum, however, none of these correspond to the originally described species, and should not be treated as such.

== Description ==
The animals kept in the pet hobby that have been misidentified as 'angustum' measure 3.5–4 inches (8.9–10.2 cm). The common nane "Costa Rican red tarantula" refers to the red hairs covering the legs and abdomen; the thorax is black or brown.
