= Citharacanthus livingstoni =

Scientific classification
- Kingdom: Animalia
- Phylum: Arthropoda
- Subphylum: Chelicerata
- Class: Arachnida
- Order: Araneae
- Infraorder: Mygalomorphae
- Family: Theraphosidae
- Genus: Citharacanthus
- Species: C. livingstoni

Binomial name
- Citharacanthus livingstoni Schmidt & Weinmann, 1996

Species of spider

Citharacanthus livingstoni is a species of New World tarantula (family Theraphosidae). It is native to eastern Guatemala. There are no recognized subspecies.
