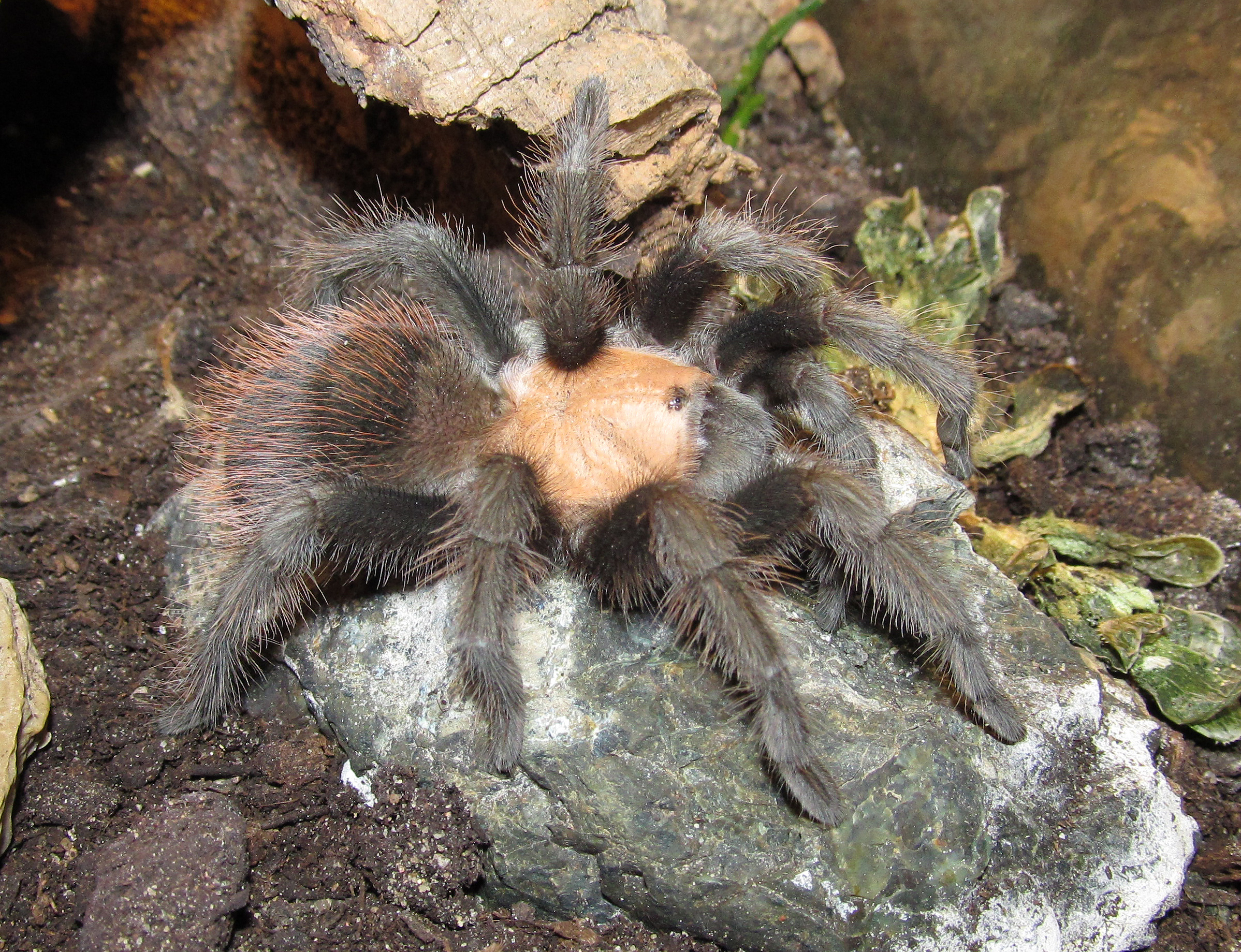
- Subadult female in captivity

Conservation status
- CITES Appendix II

Scientific classification
- Kingdom: Animalia
- Phylum: Arthropoda
- Subphylum: Chelicerata
- Class: Arachnida
- Order: Araneae
- Infraorder: Mygalomorphae
- Family: Theraphosidae
- Genus: Brachypelma
- Species: B. albiceps

Binomial name
- Brachypelma albiceps Pocock, 1903

Synonyms
- Aphonopelma albiceps (Pocock, 1903); Brachypelmides ruhnaui Schmidt, 1997; Brachypelmides albiceps (Pocock, 1903)

= Brachypelma albiceps =

Species of spider

Brachypelma albiceps is a species of spider in the tarantula family, Theraphosidae. It is known as the Mexican golden red rump tarantula or the Amula red rump tarantula. The carapace is a light golden color and the abdomen dark, covered with long red hairs. Females typically live for about 15 years (up to 20). Males usually live about 5 years or up to 12 months after the last molt.

== Description ==
Females of Brachypelma albiceps have a body length of about 65 mm. The fourth leg is longest at about 60 mm. The carapace is covered with fine hair; its apparent color depends on the illumination, varying from sandy grey through to rose or yellow. The pedipalps and the first two pairs of legs may be lighter than the last two pairs of legs. The abdomen is dark with bright red longish hairs (setae). The spermatheca has two rounded seminal receptacles.

== Taxonomy ==
Brachypelma albiceps has a somewhat tangled taxonomic history. In 1897, F. O. Pickard-Cambridge described the species Eurypelma pallidum (now Aphonopelma pallidum) on the basis of two males collected in Chihuahua, Mexico. He assumed that two female specimens, collected independently in Guerrero, belonged to the same species. In 1903, R. I. Pocock used the new name Brachypelma albiceps for these two females. He did not give a full description, merely saying in a footnote that the name was for the females from Guerrero that Pickard-Cambridge had doubtfully assigned to the same species as the males. Alexander Petrunkevitch in 1939 and Carl Roewer in 1942 restored Pickard-Cambridge's original name, treating albiceps in this context as a junior synonym of pallidum. After studying the original specimens (which neither Petrunkevitch nor Roewer had done), Andrew Smith in 1995 reinstated Pocock's distinction, recognizing the females as a separate species, which, however, he placed in the genus Aphonopelma rather than Brachypelma.

In 1997, Günter Schmidt described a new species, Brachypelmides ruhnaui from both sexes, and in 2004, transferred Pocock's Brachypelma albiceps to Brachypelmides. In 2005, Arturo Locht et al. restored Smith's Aphonopelma albiceps to its current genus Brachypelma and also synonymized Schmidt's Brachypelmides ruhnaui.

== Distribution and habitat ==
Brachypelma albiceps is endemic to the central highlands of Mexico, especially in Guerrero and south of Morelos. In the wild, they build long burrows, typically under large rocks, but may inhabit nests abandoned by rodents or other animals. They are most active at night and dusk.

== Conservation ==
In 1994, all Brachypelma species were placed on CITES Appendix II, thus restricting trade. Nevertheless, large numbers of tarantulas caught in the wild continue to be smuggled out of Mexico, including species of Brachypelma.

== Food ==
Their diet typically includes crickets, grasshoppers, beetles, and cockroaches. In captivity, live food is typically required, such as moths, mealworms and pinky mice, as dead food may be ignored.

== Reproduction ==
Females lay cocoons containing roughly 500 (up to 900) eggs two months after mating. Spiderlings hatch 8–10 weeks later.

== Pets ==
B. albiceps is commonly available at pet stores. Lighting is not needed, as these spiders naturally prefer darkness.
