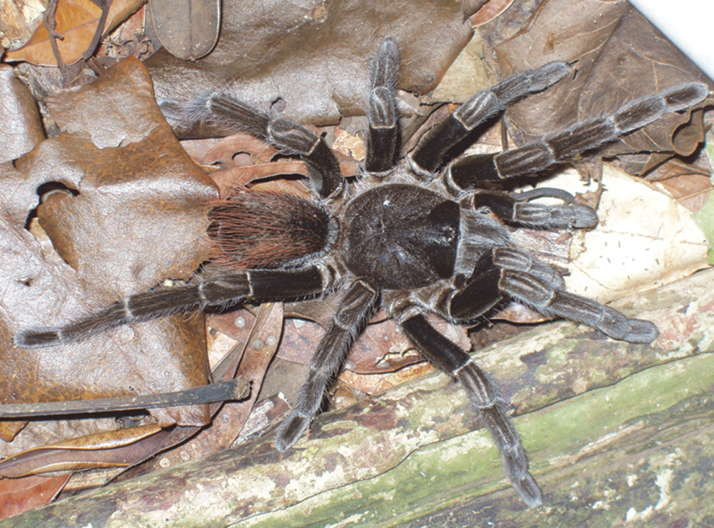
- Species from Barro Colorado Island, possibly S. embrithes

Scientific classification
- Kingdom: Animalia
- Phylum: Arthropoda
- Subphylum: Chelicerata
- Class: Arachnida
- Order: Araneae
- Infraorder: Mygalomorphae
- Family: Theraphosidae
- Genus: Sericopelma; Ausserer, 1875

Synonyms
- Harpaxictis Simon, 1892

= Sericopelma =

Genus of spiders

Sericopelma is a genus of tarantula (family Theraphosidae), found in Central America from Nicaragua to Panama. The limits of the genus and its distribution have long been confused; it is closely related to the genus Aphonopelma. Sericopelma species are among the largest found in Central America. They can be kept as pets, although at least one species has been described as "very aggressive".

== Description ==
Spiders in the genus Sericopelma are some of the largest found in Central America. Males have bodies 65–80 mm (2.6–3.1 in) long, females are somewhat longer at 70–100 mm (2.8–3.9 in). They can be kept as pets in terraria, although S. melanotarsum is described as "very aggressive".

== Diagnosis ==
Characters that distinguish species of the genus Sericopelma from other theraphosids found in the same localities include the following. The carapace is longer than wide, with a deep transverse pit (fovea) and distinct grooves radiating from it. The femur of the fourth leg has a dense pad of feathery (plumose) hair on the side facing away from the head of the animal (retrolateral); the metatarsus of the same leg has a divided and reduced trace of tuft-like (scopulate) hairs at the end furthest from the body. The first leg lacks stridulatory hairs. Females have spermathecae with a single lobe, expanded at the apex to form a P-shape in cross-section. Males lack tibial spurs and their palpal bulbs have an embolus of a characteristic shape.

== Taxonomy ==
Sericopelma was initially described by Anton Ausserer in 1875 as a subgenus of Eurypelma (now Avicularia) with the type species E. rubronitens. It was given full generic status by Simon in 1892. Until the middle of the 20th century only males were known by formal descriptions. The genus as a whole was described in 2015 as "poorly defined". Confusion with genera such as Brachypelma has been frequent; two species were transferred from that genus in 2015.

A molecular phylogenetic study in 2016 produced the cladogram shown below, showing that Sericopelma is embedded in the genus Aphonopelma, as the latter is currently circumscribed. It is likely that generic boundaries will change with further research.

- - Aphonopelma species from Central America
  - - Sericopelma
    - Aphonopelma species from the US

=== Species ===
As of May 2022, the World Spider Catalog accepted 14 species:

- Sericopelma angustum (Valerio, 1980) - Costa Rica
- Sericopelma commune F. O. Pickard-Cambridge, 1897 - Panama
- Sericopelma dota Valerio, 1980 - Costa Rica
- Sericopelma embrithes (Chamberlin & Ivie, 1936) - Panama
- Sericopelma fallax Mello-Leitão, 1923 - Brazil
- Sericopelma ferrugineum Valerio, 1980 - Costa Rica
- Sericopelma generala Valerio, 1980 - Costa Rica
- Sericopelma immensum Valerio, 1980 - Costa Rica
- Sericopelma melanotarsum Valerio, 1980 - Costa Rica
- Sericopelma panamanum ( originally Theraphosa panamanum) (Karsch, 1880) - Panama
- Sericopelma panamense (Simon, 1891) - Mexico, Panama
- Sericopelma rubronitens Ausserer, 1875 (type) - Central America
- Sericopelma silvicola Valerio, 1980 - Costa Rica
- Sericopelma upala Valerio, 1980 - Costa Rica

==== In synonymy ====
- Sericopelma balboanum (Chamberlin, 1940) = Sericopelma rubronitens
- Sericopelma consocius (Chamberlin, 1940) = Sericopelma rubronitens

==== Nomen dubium ====
- Sericopelma striatum (Ausserer, 1871) – Venezuela

==== Transferred to other genera ====
- Sericopelma carapoense (Lucas, 1983) → Nhandu carapoensis

== Distribution ==
Specimens placed in the genus have been given localities ranging from Mexico to Brazil. However, detailed studies by Gabriel and Longhorn in 2011 and 2015 suggest that some of these were errors, and that the true range of the genus is from Nicaragua to Panama.
