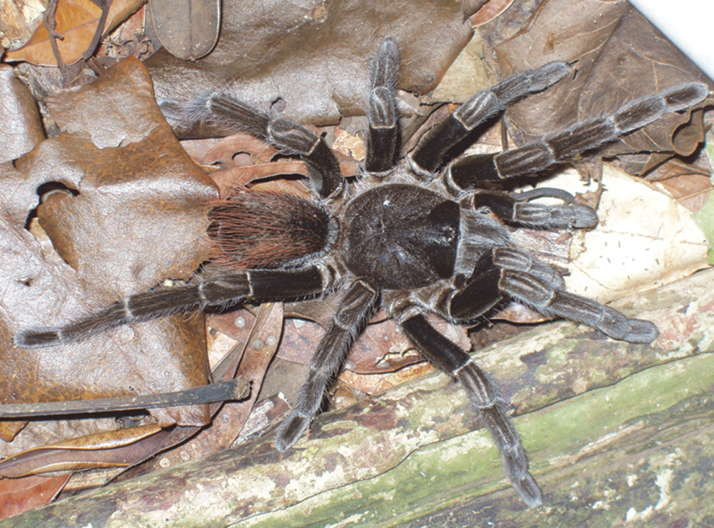

Conservation status
- CITES Appendix II

Scientific classification
- Kingdom: Animalia
- Phylum: Arthropoda
- Subphylum: Chelicerata
- Class: Arachnida
- Order: Araneae
- Infraorder: Mygalomorphae
- Family: Theraphosidae
- Genus: Sericopelma
- Species: S. embrithes

Binomial name
- Sericopelma embrithes (Chamberlin & Ivie, 1936)

Synonyms
- Eurypelma embrithes Chamberlin & Ivie, 1936; Brachypelma embrithes (Chamberlin & Ivie, 1936)

= Sericopelma embrithes =

Species of spider

Sericopelma embrithes is a tarantula that is native to Panama. To date, only specimens from Barro Colorado Island have been studied. Like other tarantulas, it is relatively large compared to other spiders. It can grow up to 59 mm long, including its chelicerae. S. embrithes is data deficient according to the IUCN.

== Taxonomy ==
Sericopelma embrithes was first described by researchers Ralph Vary Chamberlin and Wilton Ivie in 1936 on Barro Colorado Island. When the species was first discovered it was incorrectly attributed to the Eurypelma genus and then later moved to the Brachypelma genus. At that time, Sericopelma were known by their male specimen, yet only female specimens of S. embrithes have ever been described. This species finally received its present-day classification following a brief review of the history of its classification history and a morphological analysis of a female specimen.

== Habitat and ecology ==
Sericopelma embrithes inhabit the tropical, moist lowland heavily forested Barro Colorado Island. The Island typically receives about 2,623 mm of rainfall per year with average daily temperatures reaching 32°C. The area experiences both a dry season (occurring between December and April) with average rainfall only totaling to 285 mm and a wet season (between May and December).

Though localized to the Barro Colorado Island, S. embrithes may have previously had an area range that extended farther into areas that were damaged or destroyed by the effects of the Chagres River damming during the construction of the Panama Canal. The damming redirected river flow which consequently caused flooding, permanently destroying parts of the area. Another disturbance that likely may have influenced S. embrithes localization is the deforestation that occurred prior to the declaration of the island. However, since its establishment as a biological reserve in 1923 there have been no major reported disturbances to the habitat.

== Morphology ==
Females of Sericopelma embrithes have an average body length of 59 mm, but not enough data has been collected on males to have an average body length. Females have a carapace of length 28 mm and width 23 mm on average. They are generally blackish with grayish hairs on the dorsal side of the trochanters, coxae, and edges of the carapace. The blackish color fades to light brown between molts. They have black legs with gray hairs on the dorsal trochanters, and two parallel, light-colored, longitudinal lines on the patellae. The color fades to brown after a few months between molts and after the first dry season. Females also have abdomen covered in shorter black hairs with dispersed longer, red hairs. The color of their abdomen fades to a brownish color with longer russet hairs in between molts.
