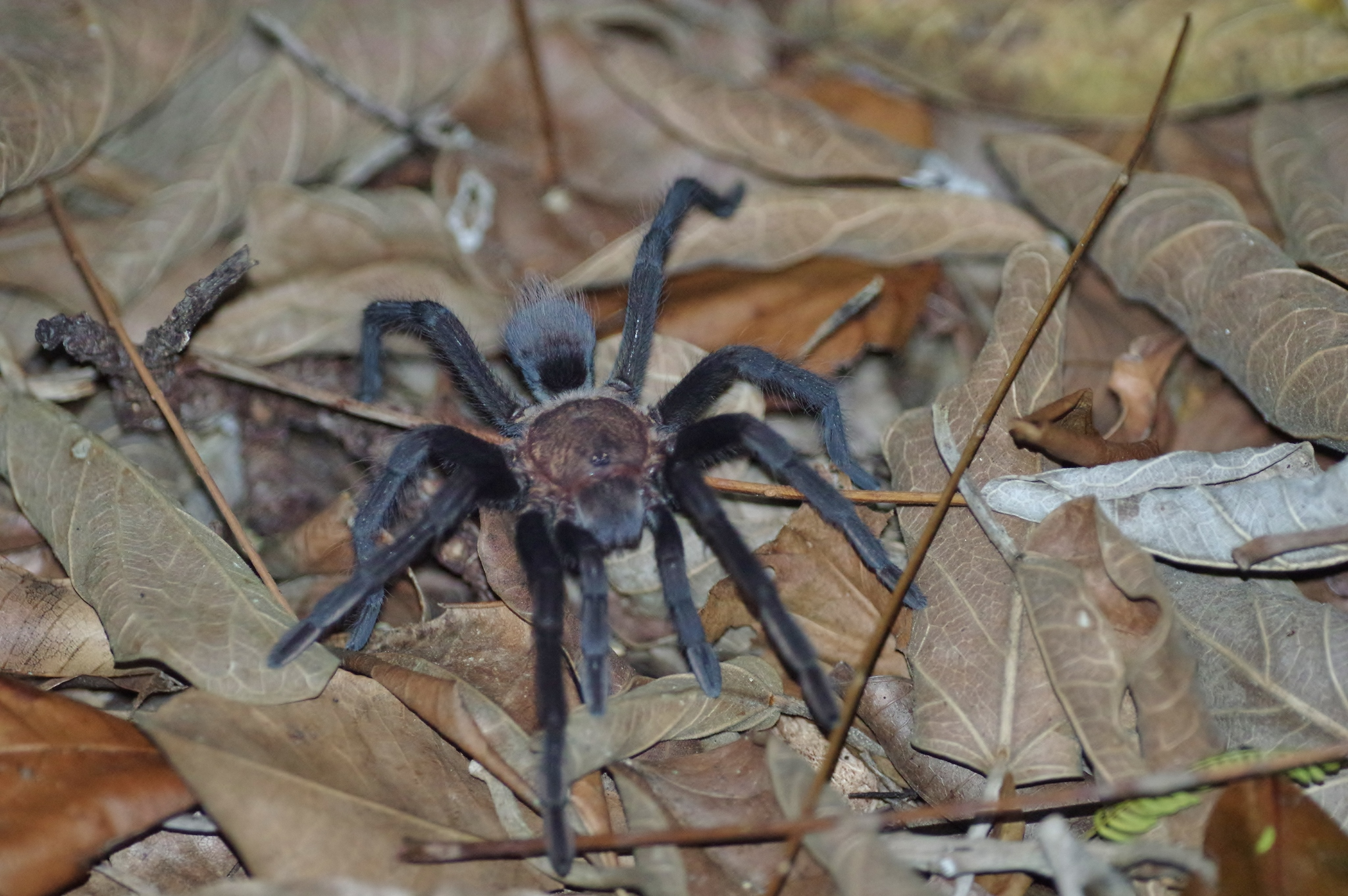
- Citharacanthus spp.

Scientific classification
- Kingdom: Animalia
- Phylum: Arthropoda
- Subphylum: Chelicerata
- Class: Arachnida
- Order: Araneae
- Infraorder: Mygalomorphae
- Family: Theraphosidae
- Genus: Citharacanthus; Pocock, 1901

Species
- See text.

= Citharacanthus =

Genus of spiders

Citharacanthus is a genus of New World tarantulas. They are found in Central America and the Antilles.

== Species ==
As of August 2022, the World Spider Catalog accepted the following 7 species:

- Citharacanthus alayoni Rudloff, 1995 – Cuba
- Citharacanthus cyaneus (Rudloff, 1994) – Cuba
- Citharacanthus livingstoni Schmidt & Weinmann, 1996 – Guatemala
- Citharacanthus longipes (F. O. Pickard-Cambridge, 1897) (type species) – Mexico, Central America
- Citharacanthus meermani Reichling & West, 2000 – Belize
- Citharacanthus niger Franganillo, 1931 – Cuba
- Citharacanthus spinicrus (Latreille, 1819) – Cuba, Hispaniola
Citharacanthus spinicrus - specimen dorsal view

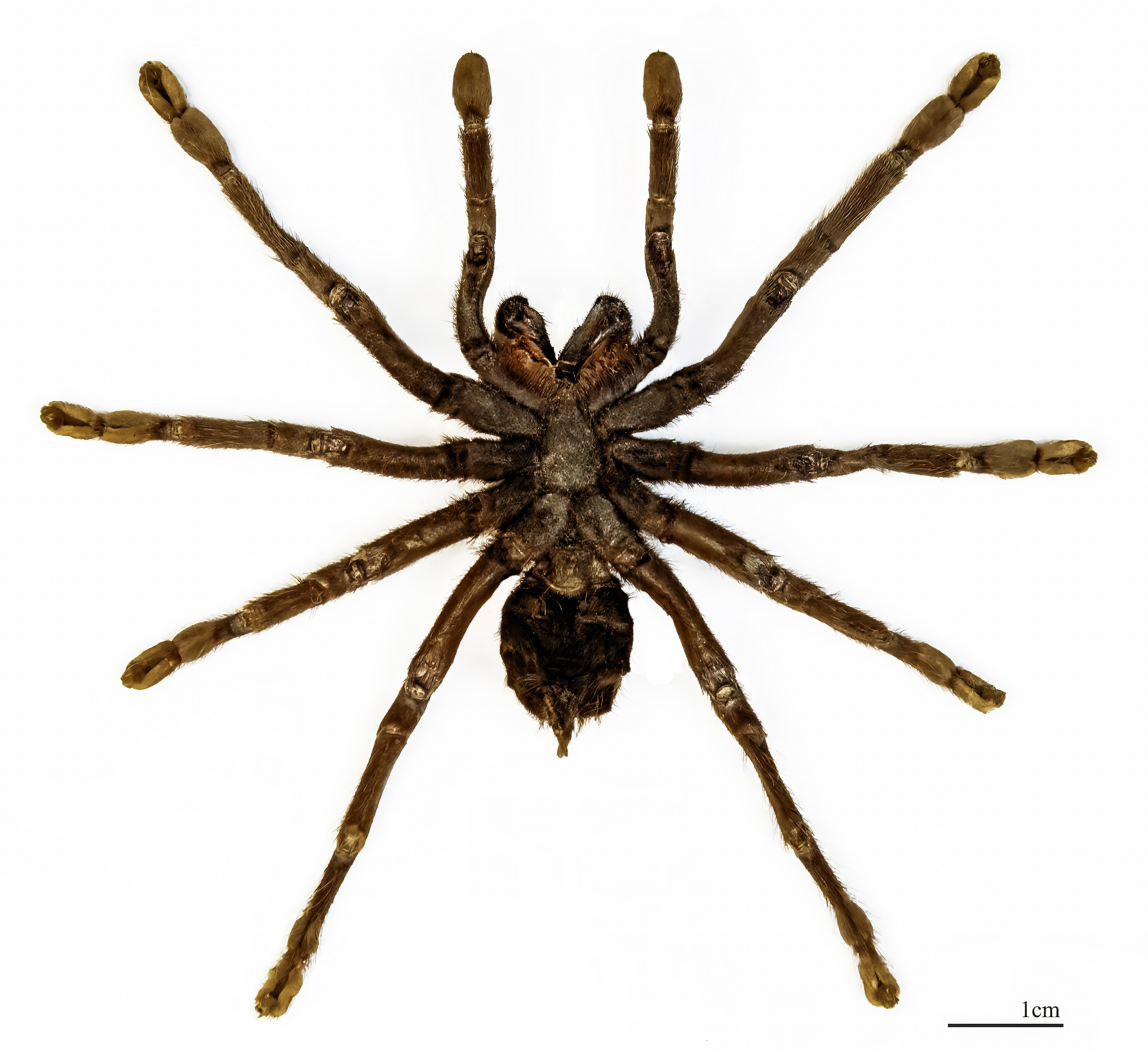
Citharacanthus spinicrus - specimen ventral view
