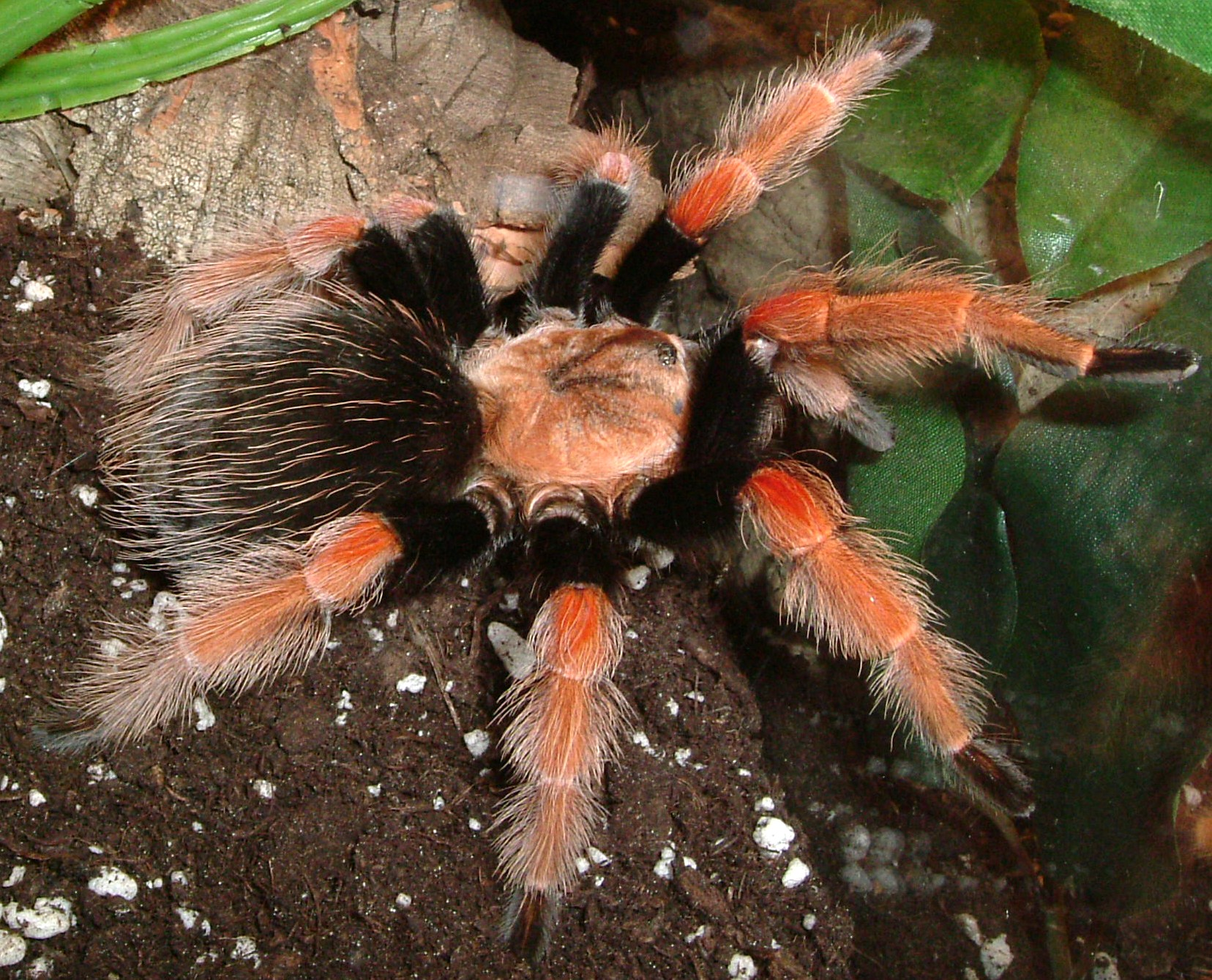
- Adult female

Conservation status
- Endangered (IUCN 3.1)
- CITES Appendix II

Scientific classification
- Kingdom: Animalia
- Phylum: Arthropoda
- Subphylum: Chelicerata
- Class: Arachnida
- Order: Araneae
- Infraorder: Mygalomorphae
- Family: Theraphosidae
- Genus: Brachypelma
- Species: B. boehmei

Binomial name
- Brachypelma boehmei Schmidt & Klaas, 1993

= Brachypelma boehmei =

Species of spider

Brachypelma boehmei (also known as the Mexican fireleg, or the Mexican rustleg tarantula) is a tarantula native to Mexico in Guerrero state. These long-lived tarantulas prefer burrowing and hiding in dry scrubland. As with all closely related tarantula species, they defend themselves with urticating hair when provoked.

== Appearance and characteristics ==
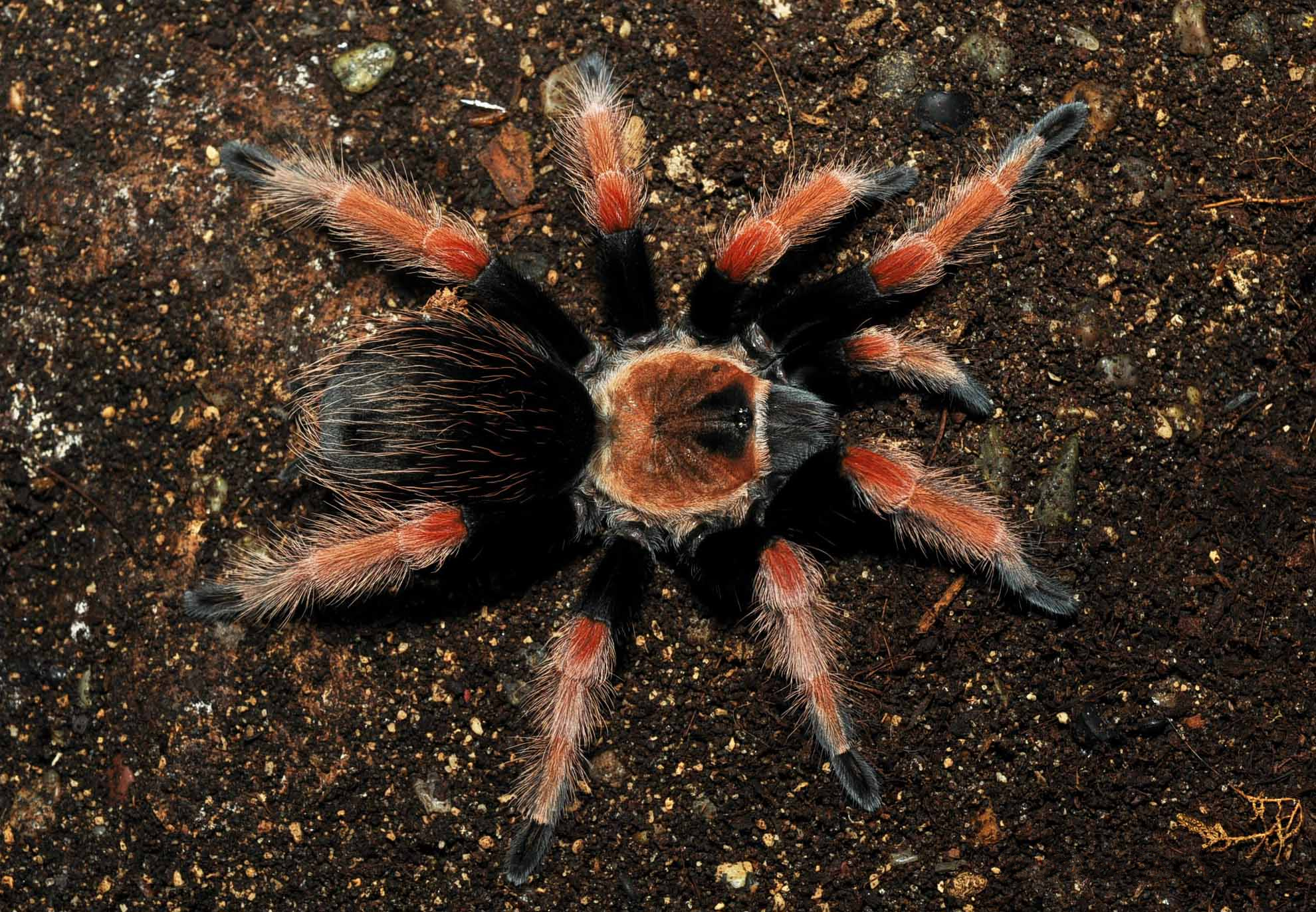
Adult female

The Mexican fireleg resembles its better-known relative, the Mexican redknee tarantula (Brachypelma hamorii, formerly confused with Brachypelma smithi), in its dramatic orange and black coloration, though the adults of the species range from 5 to 6 inches in size. This species of tarantula has a slower growth rate than many of the larger South American tarantula species. The black femora (upper legs) provide a dark dividing band between the rich orange color of the carapace and lower legs. Unlike the orange joints of Brachypelma hamorii, the legs of this species are a bright, fiery red on the patellae (or knees), fading gradually to a paler orange further down and tipped by black tarsi (or feet). Although not particularly defensive, this species of spider can have a nervous temperament, where the spider can flick urticating hairs when it feels threatened.

== Range and habitat ==
The Mexican fireleg tarantula is native to Southern Mexico and sometimes western, where it is found along the central Pacific coast in western Guerrero State, where it prefers dry scrubland, and is found in burrows, either self-made or abandoned rodent or lizard burrows, usually under rocks or fallen logs.

== Biology ==
Tarantulas of this genus are long-lived, with males reaching maturity at seven to eight years, females at nine to ten. While males only live up to a year after their final molt, females may live for a further ten years. Sub-adults and adults molt at the end of the dry season (November to June), after which males begin their search for mating females. Mated females will produce an egg sac which, if successful, will generally hatch three to four weeks before the rainy season begins. Mexican fireleg tarantulas tend to be active after dark, but can also occasionally be active during daylight, particularly in the morning and evening.

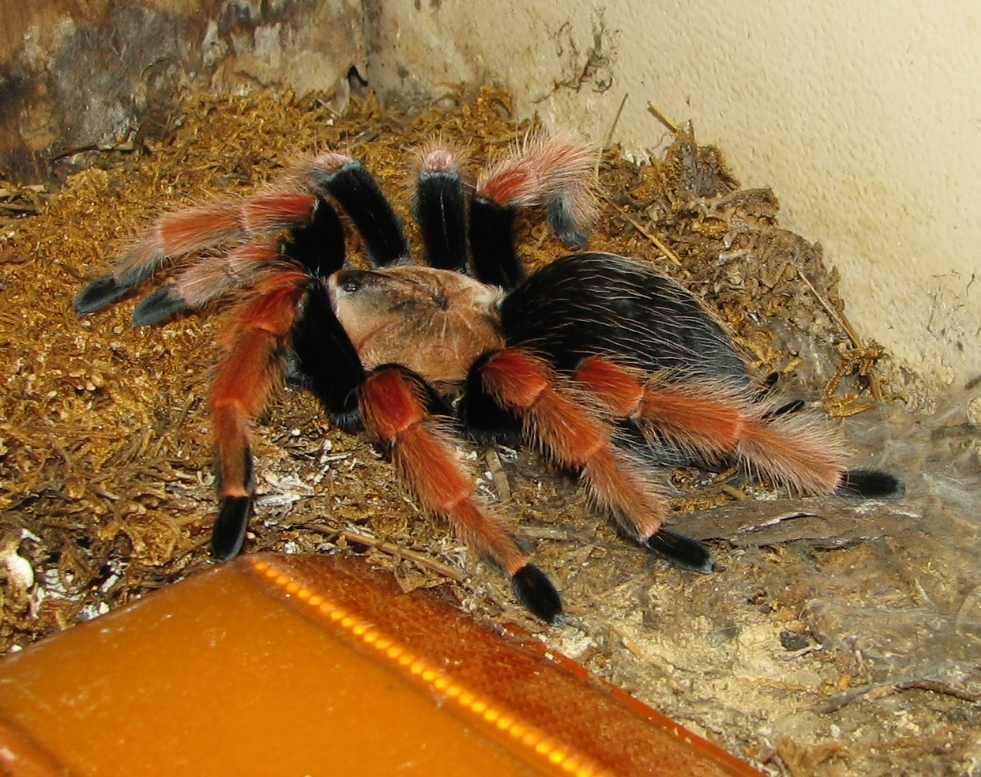
The Mexican fireleg tarantula (Brachypelma boehmei) in captivity at the Louisville Zoo

== Conservation ==
As with other Brachypelma species from the west coast of Mexico, this species makes a popular pet due to its docility and vivid colours, leading to its over-collection from the wild. The illegal pet trade, together with the ongoing destruction of natural habitat and its high mortality rate before sexual maturity, causes considerable concern for the future of this tarantula.

To regulate its commercial trade across borders, this species has been listed on Appendix II of the Convention on International Trade in Endangered Species (CITES). In Mexico, permits are required to collect or remove any spider of the family of tarantulas, Theraphosidae, and the Mexican fireleg tarantula is now frequently bred in captivity, reducing the need to collect it from the wild. Nevertheless, large numbers of tarantulas caught in the wild continue to be smuggled out of Mexico.

== As pets ==
This species is commonly kept as a pet and along with other members of its genus is regarded as suitable for beginners.

In captivity, adult Brachypelma boehmei usually feed on crickets, superworms, mealworms, and dubia roaches. Spiderlings will usually feed on pre-killed mealworms, pinhead crickets, baby dubia roaches, wingless fruit flies, and any other small insects which are not defensive.
