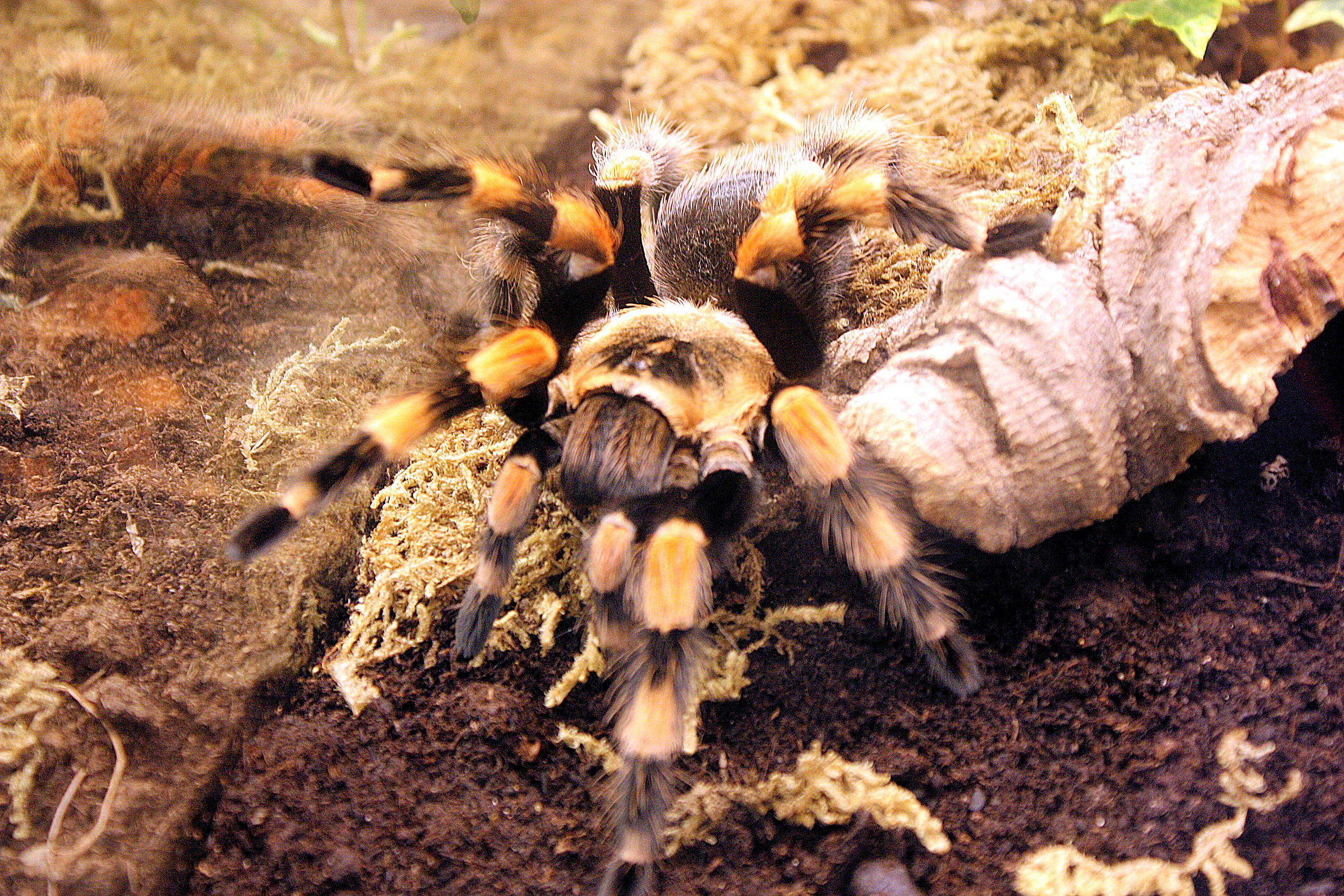

Conservation status
- Near Threatened (IUCN 3.1)
- CITES Appendix II

Scientific classification
- Kingdom: Animalia
- Phylum: Arthropoda
- Subphylum: Chelicerata
- Class: Arachnida
- Order: Araneae
- Infraorder: Mygalomorphae
- Family: Theraphosidae
- Genus: Brachypelma
- Species: B. smithi

Binomial name
- Brachypelma smithi (F.O. P-Cambridge, 1897)

Synonyms
- Eurypelma smithi F.O. Pickard-Cambridge, 1897; Euathlus smithi (F.O. Pickard-Cambridge, 1897); Brachypelma annitha Tesmoingt, Cleton & Verdez, 1997

= Brachypelma smithi =

Species of spider

Brachypelma smithi is a species of spider in the family Theraphosidae (tarantulas) native to Mexico. It has been confused with B. hamorii; both have been called Mexican redknee tarantulas. Mexican redknee tarantulas are a popular choice as pets among tarantula keepers. Many earlier sources referring to B. smithi either relate to B. hamorii or do not distinguish between the two species. B. smithi is a terrestrial tarantula native to Pacific coast of the Mexican state of Guerrero.

== Description ==
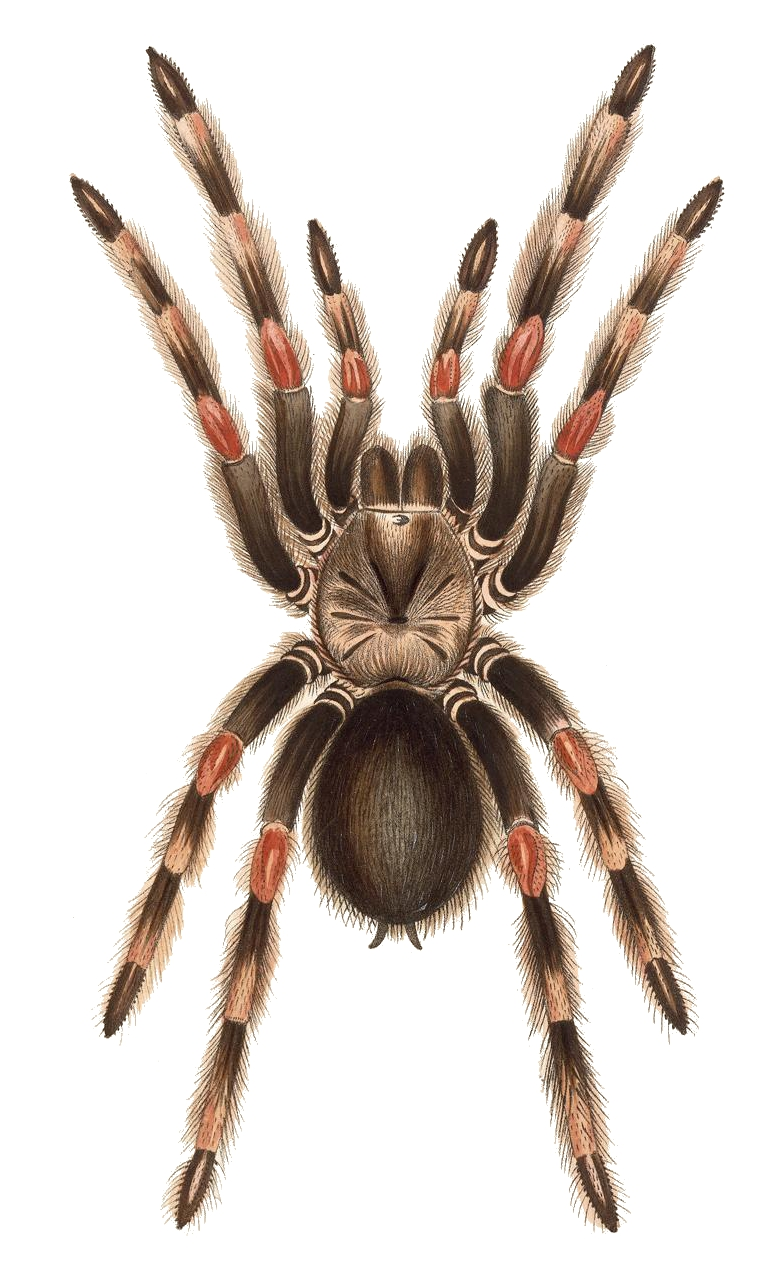
Original 1897 illustration

Brachypelma smithi is a large spider. A sample of seven females had a total body length (excluding chelicerae and spinnerets) in the range 52–59 mm (2.0–2.3 in). A sample of eight males were slightly smaller, with a total body length in the range 44–49 mm (1.7–1.9 in). Although males have slightly shorter bodies, they have longer legs. The fourth leg is the longest, measuring 70 mm (2.8 in) in the type male and 66 mm (2.6 in) in a female. The legs and palps are bluish black with three distinctly colored rings: dark reddish orange on the part of the patellae closest to the body with light yellowish pink further away, pale yellowish pink on the lower part of the tibiae, and pinkish white at the end of the metatarsi. Adult males have a yellowish brown carapace; the upper surface of the abdomen is black. Adult females vary more in carapace color and pattern. The carapace may be mainly bluish black with a light brown border, or the dark area may be broken up into a "starburst" pattern or almost reduced to two dark patches in the eye area.

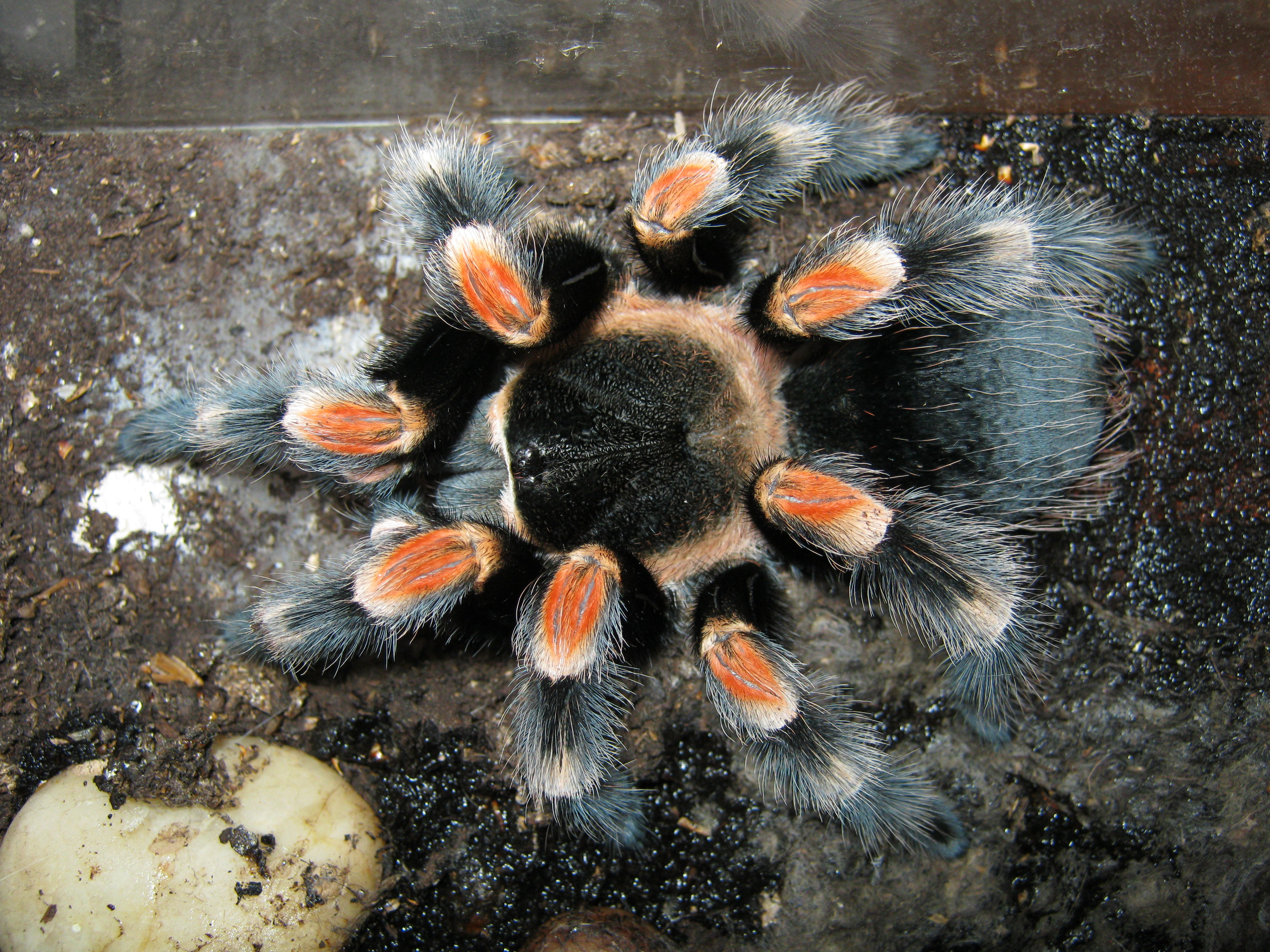
A newly moulted female

== Taxonomy ==
The species was first described by Frederick Pickard-Cambridge in 1897 as Eurypelma smithi. It was collected at Dos Arroyos, Guerrero, Mexico, by H. H. Smith. It was transferred to the genus Brachypelma by Reginald Pocock in 1903. Pickard-Cambridge identified the type specimen as a female, but in 1968 it was noticed that it was actually an immature male. In 1994, A. M. Smith confirmed that the holotype was an immature male, and redescribed the species using two different specimens: an adult male and an adult female. The specimens he used cannot now be found, but his description makes it clear that they actually belonged to a different species, B. hamorii. Even prior to Smith's description, B. hamorii had been misidentified as B. smithi.

The two species have very similar colour patterns. When viewed from above, the chelicerae of B. hamorii have two brownish pink bands on a greyish background, not visible on all individuals. B. smithi lacks these bands. Mature males of the two species can be distinguished by the shape of the palpal bulb. That of B. smithi is straighter with a broad spoon shape when viewed retrolaterally and a wider keel at the apex. In mature females of B. smithi the baseplate of the spermatheca is divided and subtriangular, rather than elliptical as in B. hamorii; also the ventral face of the spermatheca is striated rather than smooth.

Brachypelma annitha was described as a separate species in 1997, but is now considered to be conspecific with B. smithi.

=== DNA barcoding ===
DNA barcoding has been applied to some Mexican species of Brachypelma. In this approach, a portion of about 650 base pairs of the mitochondrial gene cytochrome oxidase I (COI) is used, primarily to identify existing species, but also sometimes to support a separation between species. In 2017, Mendoza and Francke showed that although B. smithi and B. hamorii are similar in superficial external appearance, they are clearly distinguished both by some finer aspects of morphology and by their DNA barcodes, although the supposed species B. annitha is nested within B. smithii.

== Distribution and habitat ==
Distribution of some Brachypelma species in Mexico: ██ Brachypelma hamorii ██ Brachyplema smithi These two were formerly often treated as the same species under the name Brachypelma smithi.

Brachypelma smithi and the very similar B. hamorii are found along the Pacific coast of Mexico on opposite sides of the Balsas River basin as it opens onto the Pacific. B. smithi is found to the south, in the state of Guerrero. The natural habitat of the species is in hilly deciduous tropical forests. It constructs or extends burrows under rocks and tree roots, among dense thickets and deciduous forests.

The burrows were described in 1999 by a source which did not distinguish between Brachypelma hamorii and B. smithi. The deep burrows keep them protected from predators, like the white-nosed coati, and enable them to ambush passing prey, such as large insects, frogs and mice. The females spend the majority of their lives in their burrows. The burrows are typically located in or not far from vegetation and consist of a single entrance with a tunnel leading to one or two chambers. The entrance is just slightly larger than the body size of the spider. The tunnel, usually about three times the tarantula's leg span in length, leads to a chamber which is large enough for the spider to safely molt. Further down the burrow, via a shorter tunnel, a larger chamber is located where the spider rests and eats its prey. When the tarantula needs privacy, e.g. when molting or laying eggs, the entrance is sealed with silk, sometimes supplemented with soil and leaves.

== Conservation ==
In 1985, B. smithi (then not distinguished from B. hamorii) was placed on CITES Appendix II, and in 1994, all remaining Brachypelma species were added. Large numbers of Mexican redknee tarantulas caught in the wild continue to be smuggled out of Mexico. It is reported that at least 3,000 specimens of Mexican tarantulas were sent to the United States or Europe a few years prior to 2017, most of which were Mexican redknee tarantulas.
