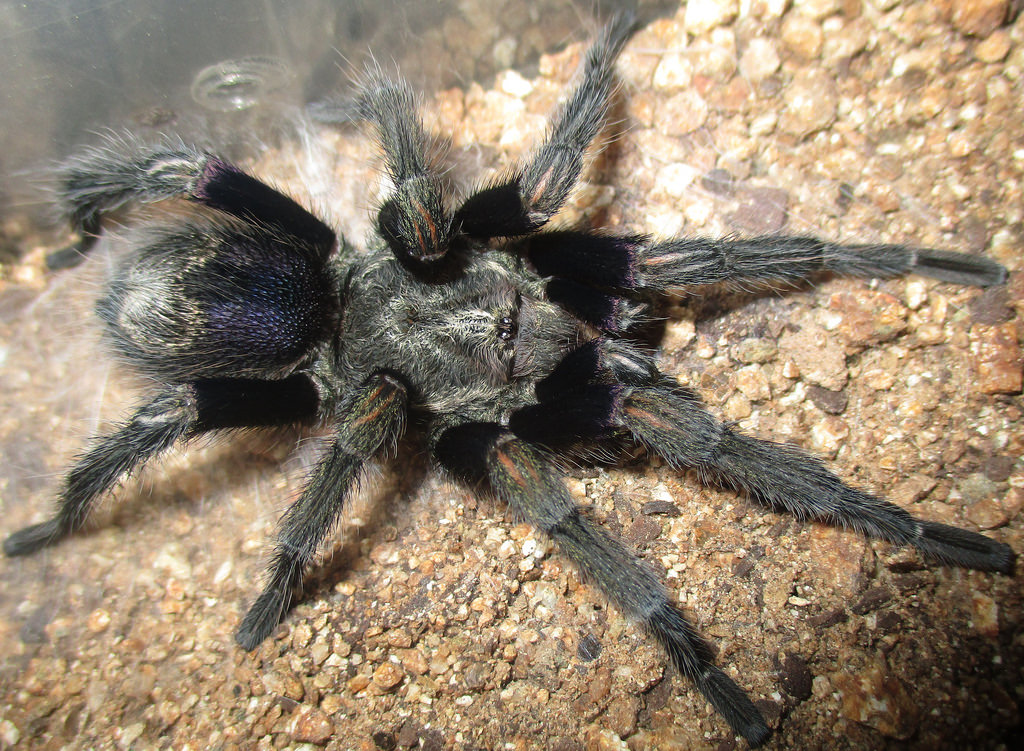
- Eathlus truculentus

Scientific classification
- Kingdom: Animalia
- Phylum: Arthropoda
- Subphylum: Chelicerata
- Class: Arachnida
- Order: Araneae
- Infraorder: Mygalomorphae
- Family: Theraphosidae
- Genus: Euathlus; Ausserer, 1875

Type species
- E. truculentus L. Koch, 1875

Species
- 14, see text

Synonyms
- Paraphysa Simon, 1892

= Euathlus =

Genus of spiders

Euathlus is a genus of South American tarantulas that was first described by Anton Ausserer in 1875. These spiders are medium sized and are usually found in high elevations in the Andes. It is a senior synonym of Paraphysa, and was formerly considered a senior synonym of Brachypelma, but this was later rejected.

== Diagnosis ==
Males own a palpal bulb with two prolateral keels, with the tip curved retrolaterally. The tibial apophyses has retrolateral spines and a spine on the retrolateral branch which almost reached the apex. And a urticating patch in the center of the opisthosoma, which own mainly type 3 and 4 urticating hairs. Females also can be distinguished by two 4 sided spermathecal receptacles, with sphere like chambers.

== Species ==
As of July 2022 it contains fourteen species, found in Argentina, Chile and Peru:

- Euathlus affinis (Nicolet, 1849) – Chile
- Euathlus antai Perafán & Pérez-Miles, 2014 – Chile
- Euathlus atacama Perafán & Pérez-Miles, 2014 – Chile
- Euathlus condorito Perafán & Pérez-Miles, 2014 – Chile
- Euathlus diamante Ferretti, 2015 – Argentina
- Euathlus grismadoi Ríos-Tamayo, 2020 – Argentina
- Euathlus manicata (Simon, 1892) – Chile
- Euathlus mauryi Ríos-Tamayo, 2020 – Argentina
- Euathlus pampa Ríos-Tamayo, 2020 – Argentina
- Euathlus parvulus (Pocock, 1903) – Chile
- Euathlus sagei Ferretti, 2015 – Argentina
- Euathlus tenebrarum Ferretti, 2015 – Argentina
- Euathlus truculentus L. Koch, 1875 (type) – Chile, Argentina
- Euathlus vanessae Quispe-Colca & Ferretti, 2021 – Peru

=== In synonymy ===
- E. phryxotrichoides (Strand, 1907) = Euathlus truculentus

=== Nomen dubium ===
- Euathlus roseus (Guérin, 1838) - Chile

=== Transferred to other genera ===
- Euathlus albopilosus (Valerio, 1980) → Tliltocatl albopilosus
- Euathlus angustus (Valerio, 1980) → Sericopelma angustum
- Euathlus chilensis (Molina, 1810) → Phrixotrichus scrofa
- Euathlus emilia (White, 1856) → Brachypelma emilia
- Euathlus fossorius (Valerio, 1980) → Sandinista lanceolatum
- Euathlus mesomelas (O. Pickard-Cambridge, 1892) → Megaphobema mesomelas
- Euathlus pallidus (F. O. Pickard-Cambridge, 1897) → Aphonopelma pallidum
- Euathlus peruvianus (Schmidt, 2007) → Thrixopelma peruvianum
- Euathlus pulcherrimaklaasi (Schmidt, 1991 ) → Cyclosternum pulcherrimaklaasi (Nomen dubium)
- Euathlus sabulosus (F. O. Pickard-Cambridge, 1897) → Tliltocatl sabulosus
- Euathlus scrofa (Molina, 1782) → Phrixotrichus scrofa
- Euathlus smithi (F. O. Pickard-Cambridge, 1897) → Brachypelma smithi
- Euathlus vagans (Ausserer, 1875) → Tliltocatl vagans
- Euathlus vulpinus (Karsch, 1880) → Phrixotrichus vulpinus
- Euathlus vulpinus ater (Donoso, 1957) → Phrixotrichus vulpinus ater (Nomen dubium)
