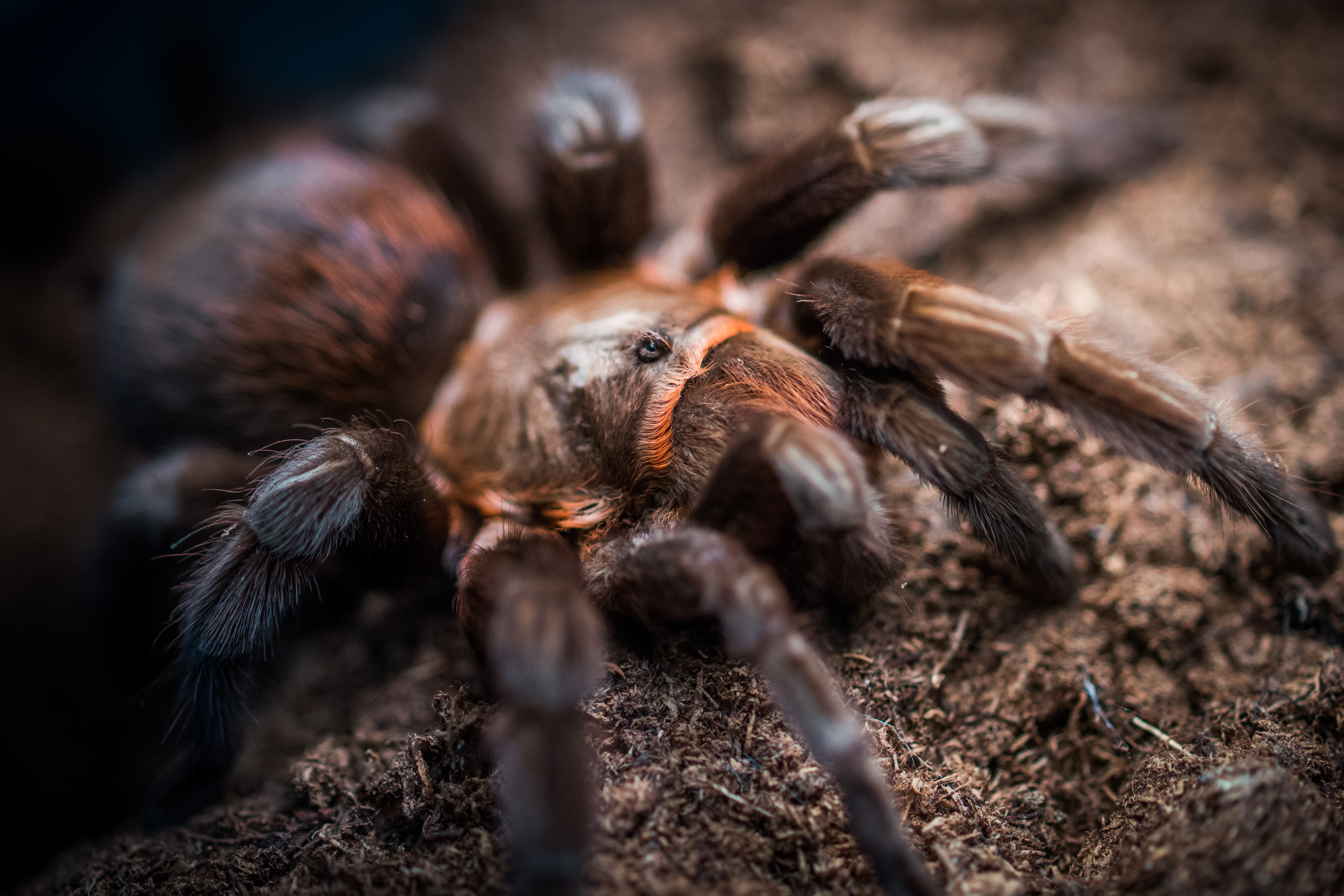

Scientific classification
- Kingdom: Animalia
- Phylum: Arthropoda
- Subphylum: Chelicerata
- Class: Arachnida
- Order: Araneae
- Infraorder: Mygalomorphae
- Family: Theraphosidae
- Genus: Tliltocatl
- Species: T. kahlenbergi

Binomial name
- Tliltocatl kahlenbergi (Rudloff, 2008)

Synonyms
- Brachypelma kahlenbergi Rudloff, 2008

= Tliltocatl kahlenbergi =

Species of spider

Tliltocatl kahlenbergi (synonym Brachypelma kahlenbergi) is a species of spider in the family Theraphosidae (tarantulas), found in Mexico.

== Description ==
Tliltocatl kahlenbergi is a relatively small member of the genus. Three males had total body lengths of between 32 mm and 34 mm; the female is larger, one having a body length of 41 mm. The fourth leg is longest, up to 58 mm in males and about 49 mm in females. The body is generally dark with relatively dense covering of red hair on the abdomen and legs compared to the more sparse red hairs in T. schroederi, which this species resembles. The carapace is variable in colour, and can appear quite bright.

Like T. schroederi, fewer larger eggs are produced than in most related species, and the spiderlings are correspondingly larger.

== Taxonomy ==
Tliltocatl kahlenbergi was first described in 2008 by Jan-Peter Rudloff as Brachypelma kahlenbergi. The specimens used in his description came from Herwig Kahlenberg, who was the first to recognize them as a new species. Spiders from Veracruz in Mexico had been sent to Kahlenberg in Germany, where he had distributed offspring. T. kahlenbergi is distinguished from all other species in the genus by the arrangement of the sigilla on the sternum, and by possessing two spines, rather than one, on the prolateral tibial apophysis. In November 2019, it was proposed that Brachypelma kahlenbergi be moved to the new genus Tliltocatl; this has been accepted by the World Spider Catalog.

== Distribution and habitat ==
Tliltocatl kahlenbergi was described from specimens in captivity, reported to be collected from around Veracruz, Mexico. It lives in burrows in the ground, like other related species.

== Conservation ==
All species of Brachypelma, then including Tliltocatl, were placed on CITES Appendix II in 1994, thus restricting trade, although T. kahlenbergi had not been described then and is not explicitly listed.
