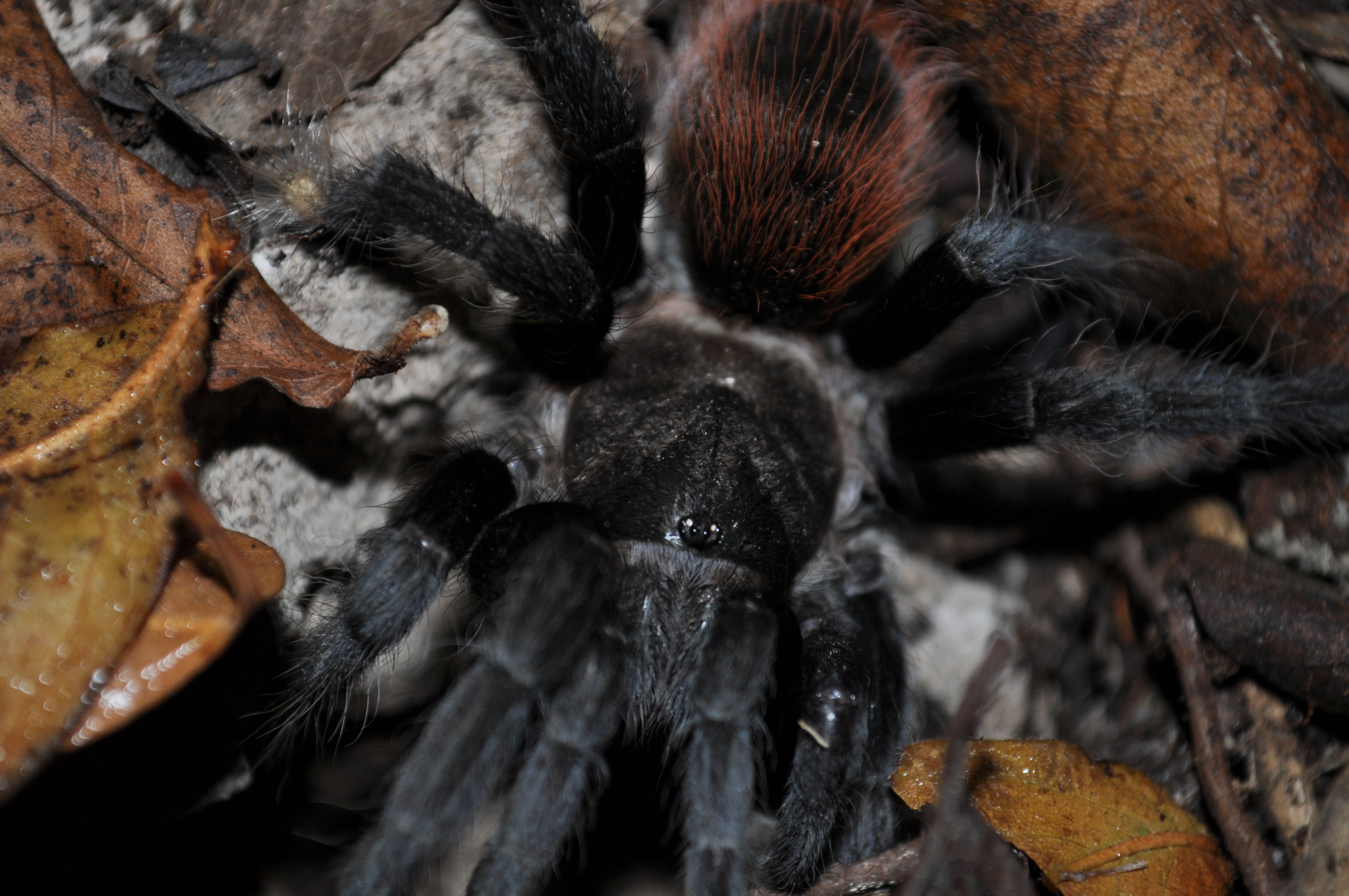

Scientific classification
- Kingdom: Animalia
- Phylum: Arthropoda
- Subphylum: Chelicerata
- Class: Arachnida
- Order: Araneae
- Infraorder: Mygalomorphae
- Family: Theraphosidae
- Genus: Tliltocatl
- Species: T. epicureanus

Binomial name
- Tliltocatl epicureanus (Chamberlin, 1925)

Synonyms
- Brachypelma epicureanum (Chamberlin, 1925); Eurypelma epicureana Chamberlin, 1925; Dugesiella epicureana (Chamberlin, 1925)

= Tliltocatl epicureanus =

Species of spider

Tliltocatl epicureanus (synonym Brachypelma epicureanum) is a species of spider in the family Theraphosidae (tarantulas), found in the Yucatán Peninsula of Mexico.

== Description ==
The male holotype of Tliltocatl epicureanus has a total body length of 50 mm. The fourth leg is longest at 62 mm. The carapace and legs are brown; the abdomen is black with rusty-red hairs (setae). Plumose setae are present on the femur of the first leg.

== Taxonomy ==
Tliltocatl epicureanus was first described, as Eurypelma epicureana, by Ralph Chamberlin in 1925. It was transferred to the genus Brachypelma by Andrew Smith in 1993, retaining the incorrect ending of the specific name, which he corrected to epicureanum in 1995. Chamberlin described a male and a female, both from Chichen Itza in Yucatán, Mexico. In November 2019, it was proposed that Brachypelma epicureanum be moved to the genus Tliltocatl; this has been accepted by the World Spider Catalog.

== Distribution and habitat ==
Tliltocatl epicureanus is found in central Yucatán, in moist forest and rainforest. Apparently closely related to T. vagans, it is much less widespread in south-eastern Mexico.

== Conservation ==
All species of Brachypelma, then including Tliltocatl, were placed on CITES Appendix II in 1994, thus restricting trade. Nevertheless, large numbers of tarantulas caught in the wild continue to be smuggled out of Mexico.
