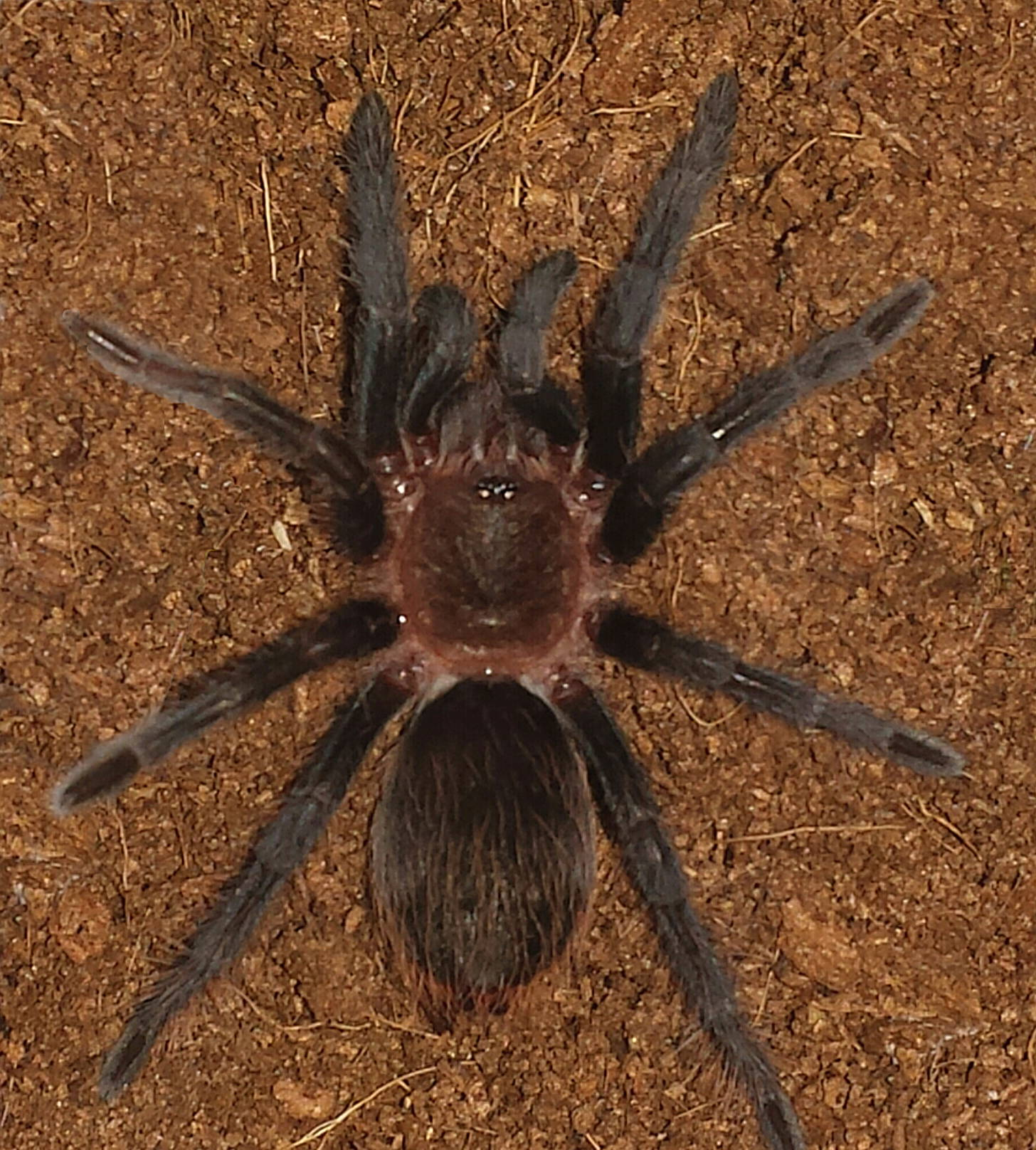

Scientific classification
- Kingdom: Animalia
- Phylum: Arthropoda
- Subphylum: Chelicerata
- Class: Arachnida
- Order: Araneae
- Infraorder: Mygalomorphae
- Family: Theraphosidae
- Genus: Tliltocatl
- Species: T. verdezi

Binomial name
- Tliltocatl verdezi (Schmidt, 2003)

= Tliltocatl verdezi =

Species of spider

Tliltocatl verdezi (synonym Brachypelma verdezi) is a species of spiders in the family Theraphosidae (tarantulas), found in Mexico.

== Description ==
Tliltocatl verdezi is small for a member of the genus. The male has a total body length of about 30 mm. The fourth leg is the longest, at about 55 mm. The male's body is very dark, almost completely black, with red and orange hair on the upper surface of the abdomen and on the legs. The female has a slightly lighter cephalothorax with a dark triangle at the front. The male has two apophyses (projections) on the tibia of the first leg, the smaller of which has a spine on the inside.

== Taxonomy ==
Prior to 2003, there was confusion over the identity of Tliltocatl verdezi. Some spiders in captivity were called "Aphonopelma pallidum" or "Brachypelma pallidum". In 1994, Andrew Smith reported that the male and female preserved specimens that had been used to describe a species under the name "pallidum" actually belonged to two different species, collected more than 1,050 km apart. The males are now treated as Aphonopelma pallidum, the females as Brachypelma albiceps. The spiders in captivity given the name pallidum appeared to belong to neither of these species – for one thing they were very dark in colour, whereas in Latin pallidum means 'pale'. A specimen received by tarantula keeper Heinz-Josef Peters under the name "Aphonopelma pallidum" was sent to Günter Schmidt for study. Schmidt determined that it was a new species, which he named Brachypelma verdezi. The specific name refers to J.-M. Verdez, who was one of the first to realize that these spiders were being incorrectly named. In November 2019, it was proposed that Brachypelma verdezi be moved to the genus Tliltocatl; this has been accepted by the World Spider Catalog.

== Distribution ==
The distribution of Tliltocatl verdezi within Mexico is Southern Guerrero and into eastern Oaxaca. Ray Gabriel and Stuart Longhorn in 2015 gave the location of a female collected by Arturo Locht in Mexico as Acapulco, i.e. on the Pacific coast. This seemed to contradict the original description Gunter Schmidt who stated that the "locus typicus" is further north and inland than had been reported previously by Locht et al. 1999. by a map indicating south-central Guerrero. However, Schmidt merely went on to define the type locality very poorly as "an unspecified area south of Toluca, Guerrero (Mexico)". Elsewhere he refers to field collected information by Peter Klaas that the "species could occur in the Mexican states of Guerrero and Oaxaca" and who gave detailed their lifestyle in nature. This issue was much later discussed by Longhorn 2014, who clarified that Schmidt was notorious for vague or incorrect locality information, and referring to other published information at the time clearly indicating the stock origins as "Acapulco, Guerrero". Fieldwork by various parties have repeatedly found the same species Tliltocatl verdezi in this coastal zone and north into Central Guerrero, but none have been reported as found anywhere near "Toluca", only much further south. The precise type locality remains unknown, but its natural distribution is now clear.

== Conservation ==
All species of Brachypelma, then including Tliltocatl, were placed on CITES Appendix II in 1994, thus restricting trade. T. verdezi was not explicitly listed, as it had not been described at the time.
