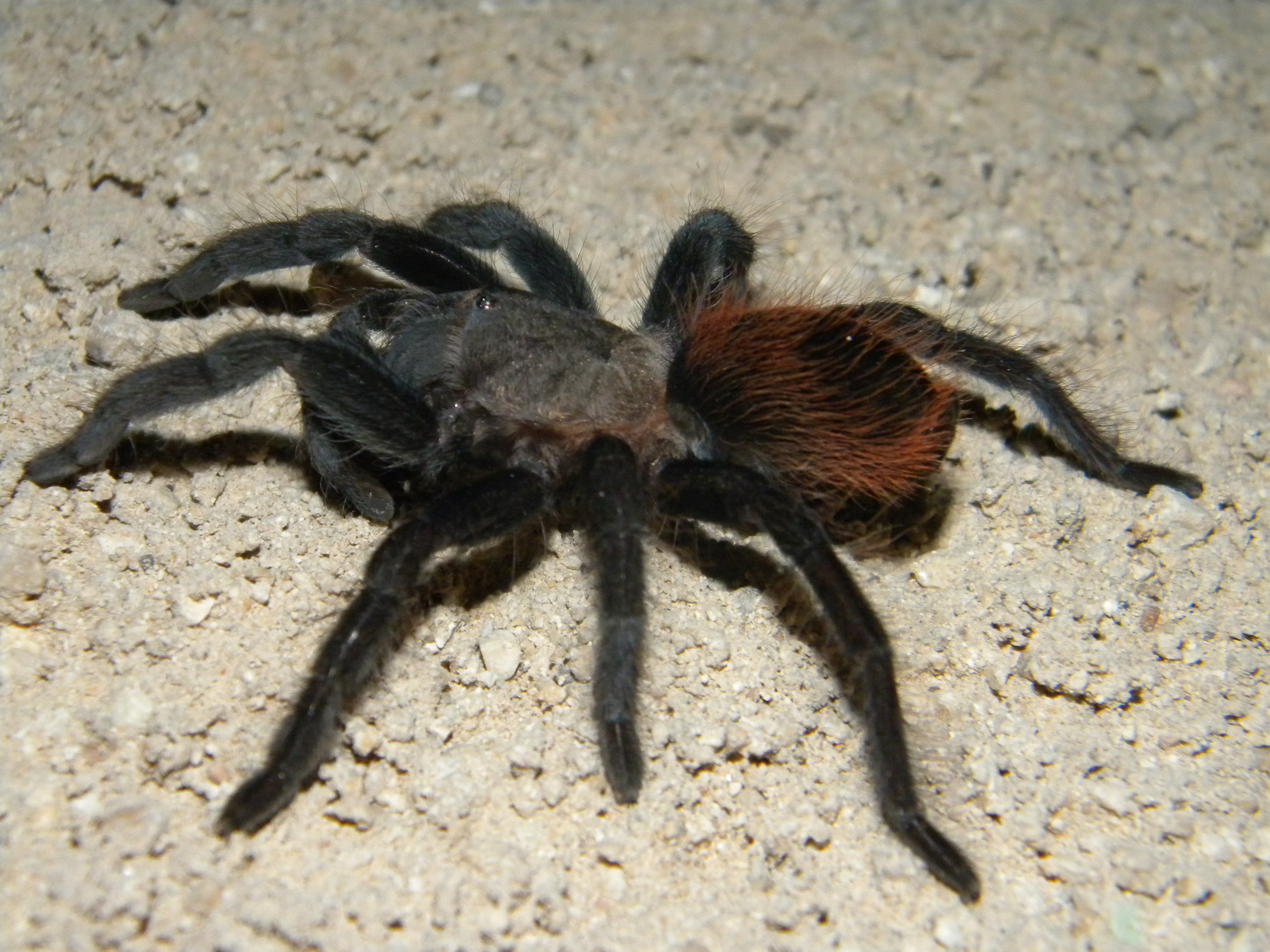
- Tliltocatl vagans

Scientific classification
- Kingdom: Animalia
- Phylum: Arthropoda
- Subphylum: Chelicerata
- Class: Arachnida
- Order: Araneae
- Infraorder: Mygalomorphae
- Family: Theraphosidae
- Genus: Tliltocatl; Mendoza & Francke, 2020

Type species
- Tliltocatl vagans (Ausserer, 1875)

Species
- 7, see text

= Tliltocatl =

Genus of tarantulas

Tliltocatl is a genus of North American tarantulas that was split off from Brachypelma in 2020. They are also large burrowing tarantulas, but don't have the striking red leg markings of Brachypelma species. A female T. vagans can grow up to 50 mm (2.0 in) long and legs can get as long as 55 mm (2.2 in). They are found predominantly in Mexico, with some species native to Central America. The name is derived from two Nahuatl words, "tlil", meaning "black", and "tocatl", meaning "spider". Habitat destruction and collection for the pet trade has led to this and Brachypelma to be protected under International Convention on International Trade of Endangered Species rules, beginning with B. smithi.

== Description ==
The carapace is about as long as wide, though the sternum is longer than wide. The first legs are the longest, but all four legs have undivided scopuli on its tarsus. Stridulating hairs are present on both the retrolateral and prolateral faces of the second segment of the pedipalp, as well as on the third segment of the first leg. Sexually mature males have two tibial apophyses, the retrolateral one being slightly curved at the end. They share many features with Brachypelma species, including stridulating hairs in the same locations. Both have type I urticating hairs surrounding type III on the rear of their abdomens. Male palpal bulbs are similar, both spoon-shaped at the end. Females have a single fused spermatheca with an either absent or weakly developed baseplate. Tliltocatl species can be distinguished from those of Brachypelma by their coloration, especially evident in the absence red rings on the legs. Red markings are also absent from the carapace. They have long red or yellowish hairs on their abdomens, spines on the patellae of both the palps, and different genitalia shapes.

== Habitat ==
They are found in a variety of habitats, including deciduous forests, evergreen rainforests, and grasslands. They live in burrows, commonly found under rocks, logs, and tree roots. Some species dig burrows in farmlands and gardens. Species occur on both the Pacific and the Atlantic coasts as well as the Gulf of Mexico. Though they are native to Mexico and Central America, the precise distribution is uncertain due to widespread traffic in the pet market. T. kahlenbergi is only known from specimens originally sent to Germany from Veracruz intended to be sold as pets. Mendoza and Francke produced a map of confirmed specimens in 2020, and a distribution of Mexico, Guatemala, Belize, Nicaragua, and Costa Rica is supported by the World Spider Catalog. In the text, Mendoza and Francke add Honduras and El Salvador.

== Taxonomy ==
Comparison of typical Tliltocatl and Brachypelma species
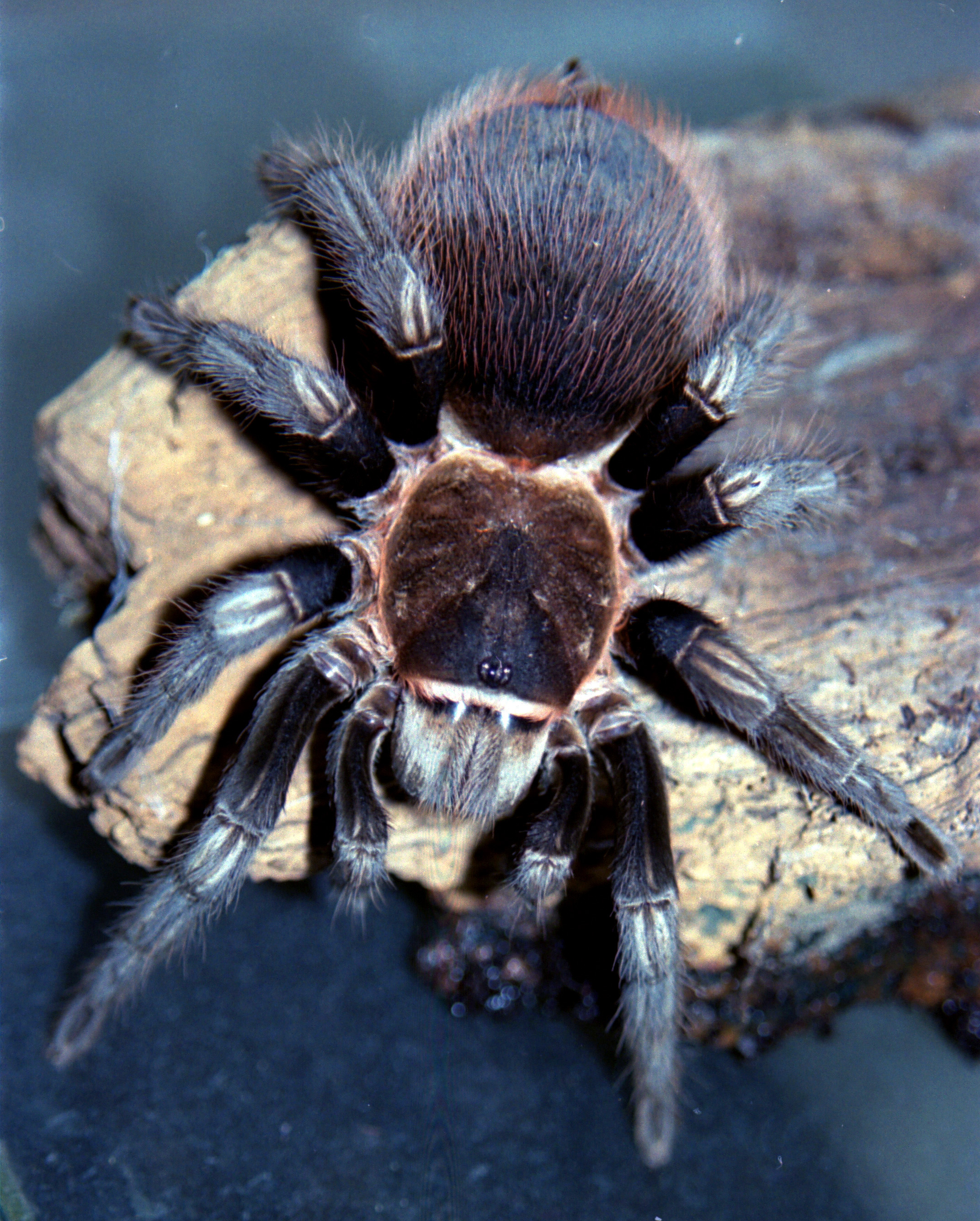
Tliltocatl cf. sabulosum

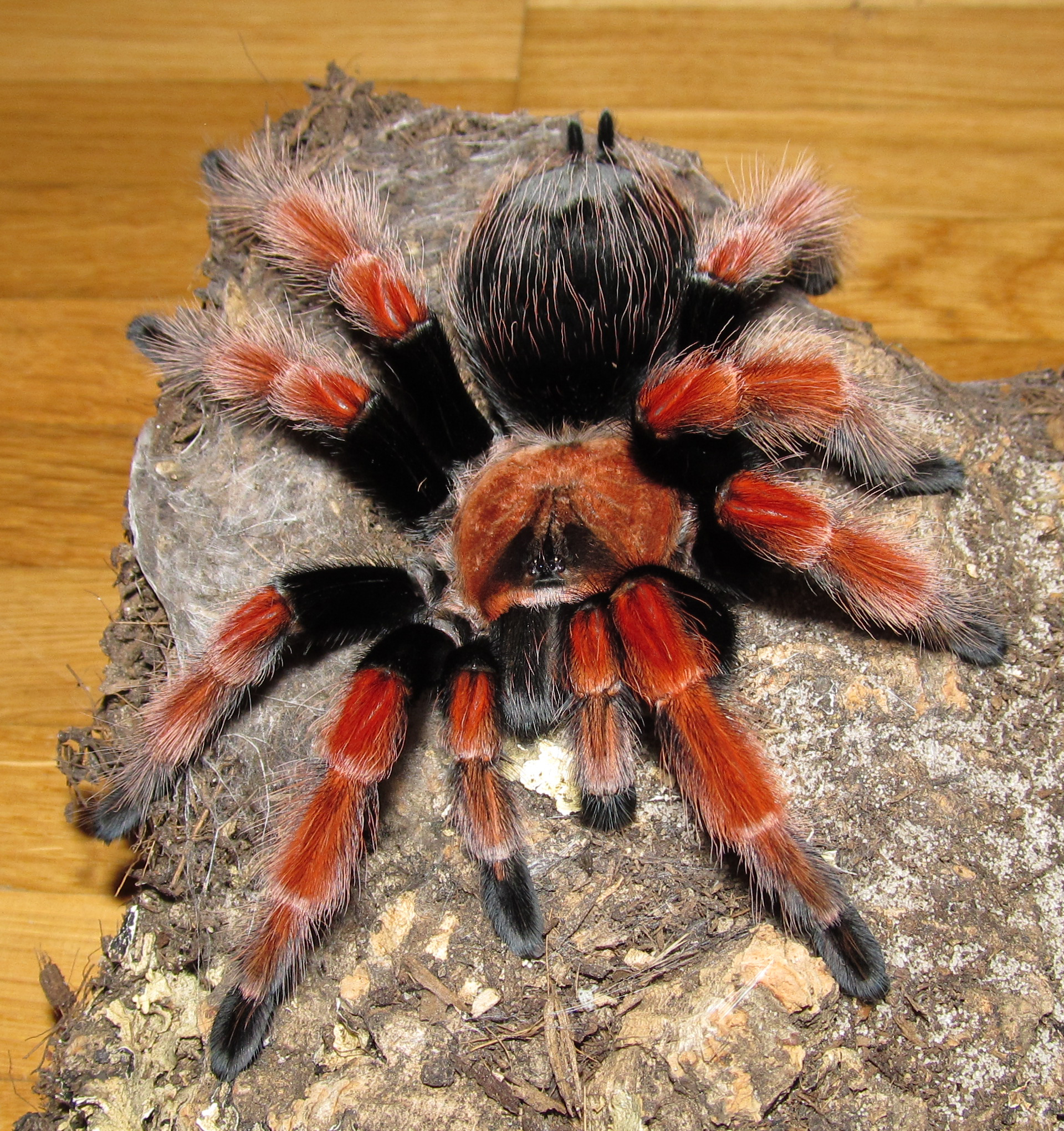
Brachypelma boehmei

Tliltocatl was erected by Mendoza and Francke in 2020, when molecular phylogenetic studies showed that Brachypelma consists of two distinct clades. The previous classification was based on coloration, grouping those with red leg markings with Brachypelma and red carapace markings with Tliltocatl.

A maximum likelihood cladogram based on a mitochondrial gene shows Tliltocatl well separated from Brachypelma, with the internal relationships of Tliltocatl as shown below:

- Tliltocatl
  - Tliltocatl schroederi
  - - Tliltocatl verdezi
    - Tliltocatl kahlenbergi
    - - Tliltocatl epicureanus
      - - Tliltocatl vagans
        - - Tliltocatl sabulosus
          - Tliltocatl albopilosus

The position of T. verdezi and T. kahlenbergi could not be resolved, and the clade formed by T. vagans, T. sabulosus and T. albopilosus had weak internal support. The distribution of the species shows some relationship with the cladogram, with the three western Mexican species, T. schroederi, T. kahlenbergi and T. verdezi, separated from the remaining species from eastern Mexico and Central America.

== Species ==
As of July 2022 it contains seven species:

- Tliltocatl albopilosus (Valerio, 1980) – Costa Rica
- Tliltocatl epicureanus (Chamberlin, 1925) – Mexico
- Tliltocatl kahlenbergi (Rudloff, 2008) – Mexico
- Tliltocatl sabulosus (F. O. Pickard-Cambridge, 1897) – Guatemala
- Tliltocatl schroederi (Rudloff, 2003) – Mexico
- Tliltocatl vagans (Ausserer, 1875) (type) – Mexico, Guatemala, Belize
- Tliltocatl verdezi (Schmidt, 2003) – Mexico

=== Nomina dubia ===
- Tliltocatl alvarezi (Estrada-Alvarez, Guadarrama & Martínez, 2013) - Mexico
- Tliltocatl andrewi (Schmidt, 1992) - Unknown locality
- Tliltocatl aureoceps (Chamberlin, 1917) - United States or Mexico

== See also ==
- Brachypelma
