= Tliltocatl aureoceps =

Conservation status
- Data Deficient (IUCN 3.1)

Scientific classification
- Kingdom: Animalia
- Phylum: Arthropoda
- Subphylum: Chelicerata
- Class: Arachnida
- Order: Araneae
- Infraorder: Mygalomorphae
- Family: Theraphosidae
- Genus: Tliltocatl
- Species: T. aureoceps

Binomial name
- Tliltocatl aureoceps (Chamberlin, 1917), nomen dubium

Synonyms
- Eurypelma aureoceps Chamberlin, 1917; Brachypelma aureoceps (Chamberlin, 1917)

Species of spider

Tliltocatl aureoceps (synonym Brachypelma aureoceps) is a possible species of spider in the family Theraphosidae (tarantulas). The World Spider Catalog regards it as a nomen dubium (dubious name). Only one female has been described; this was captured in the Florida Keys, but is likely to have been imported from Mexico.

== Description ==
The single described female of Tliltocatl aureoceps has a body length of 55 mm. The fourth leg is longest at 54 mm. The basic colour is described as "dark chestnut". The carapace, legs and abdomen have fine golden brown hairs; the legs and abdomen have in addition longer yellowish hairs (setae). Plumose setae are present on the femur of the fourth leg.

== Taxonomy ==
Tliltocatl aureoceps was first described, as Eurypelma aureoceps, by Ralph Chamberlin in 1917, based on a single female collected earlier by J. B. Holder in Florida. The specific name aureoceps means "golden head". It was transferred to Brachypelma by Andrew Smith in 1993, and to Tliltocatl, along with other species of Brachypelma, in 2020.

Little is known of the origin of the type specimen. The collection number (MCZ 43) suggests that it was acquired by the Museum of Comparative Zoology before 1870. The location is given as Tortugas Island, Florida. Smith suggests that the spider may have been imported with building material from Mexico during the construction of Fort Jefferson, as it appears to be a typical Mexican species of what was then the genus Brachypelma.
