= Phrixotrichus jara =

Scientific classification
- Kingdom: Animalia
- Phylum: Arthropoda
- Subphylum: Chelicerata
- Class: Arachnida
- Order: Araneae
- Infraorder: Mygalomorphae
- Family: Theraphosidae
- Genus: Phrixotrichus
- Species: P. jara

Binomial name
- Phrixotrichus jara Perafán & Pérez-Miles, 2014

Species of tarantula

Phrixotrichus jara is a species of tarantula found in Chile. The species epithet is named after Victor Jara, a famous Chilean singer who died in 1973 after being killed by the government of dictator Augusto Pinochet. The holotype of the species was collected in the Biobio Region of Chile near Concepcion and Nonguén National Park at a height of 150 meters above sea level.
