= Tliltocatl alvarezi =

Scientific classification
- Kingdom: Animalia
- Phylum: Arthropoda
- Subphylum: Chelicerata
- Class: Arachnida
- Order: Araneae
- Infraorder: Mygalomorphae
- Family: Theraphosidae
- Genus: Tliltocatl
- Species: T. alvarezi

Binomial name
- Tliltocatl alvarezi (Estrada-Alvarez, Guadarrama & Martínez, 2013), nomen dubium

Synonyms
- Citharacanthus alvarezi Estrada-Alvarez, Guadarrama & Martínez, 2013

Species of spider

Tliltocatl alvarezi is a possible species of spider in the family Theraphosidae (tarantulas). The World Spider Catalog regards it as a nomen dubium (dubious name). The original description, in the genus Citharacanthus as C. alvarezi, was based on a specimen said to be a female, but this is now regarded as a juvenile male. It was transferred to Tliltocatl in 2020.
