= Euathlus affinis =

Scientific classification
- Kingdom: Animalia
- Phylum: Arthropoda
- Subphylum: Chelicerata
- Class: Arachnida
- Order: Araneae
- Infraorder: Mygalomorphae
- Family: Theraphosidae
- Genus: Euathlus
- Species: E. affinis

Binomial name
- Euathlus affinis (Nicolet, 1849)

Synonyms
- Avicularia affinis; Brachypelma affinis; Mygale affinis

Species of spider

Euathlus affinis is a species of spider belonging to the family Theraphosidae (tarantulas). It is native to Chile.

== Taxonomy ==
The species was first described in 1849 as Mygale affinis. However, Mygale had been used previously for a genus of mammals, and the correct name for the genus is Avicularia, making this species Avicularia affinis. It was subsequently transferred to Brachypelma in 1936 and then to Euathlus in 2017.
