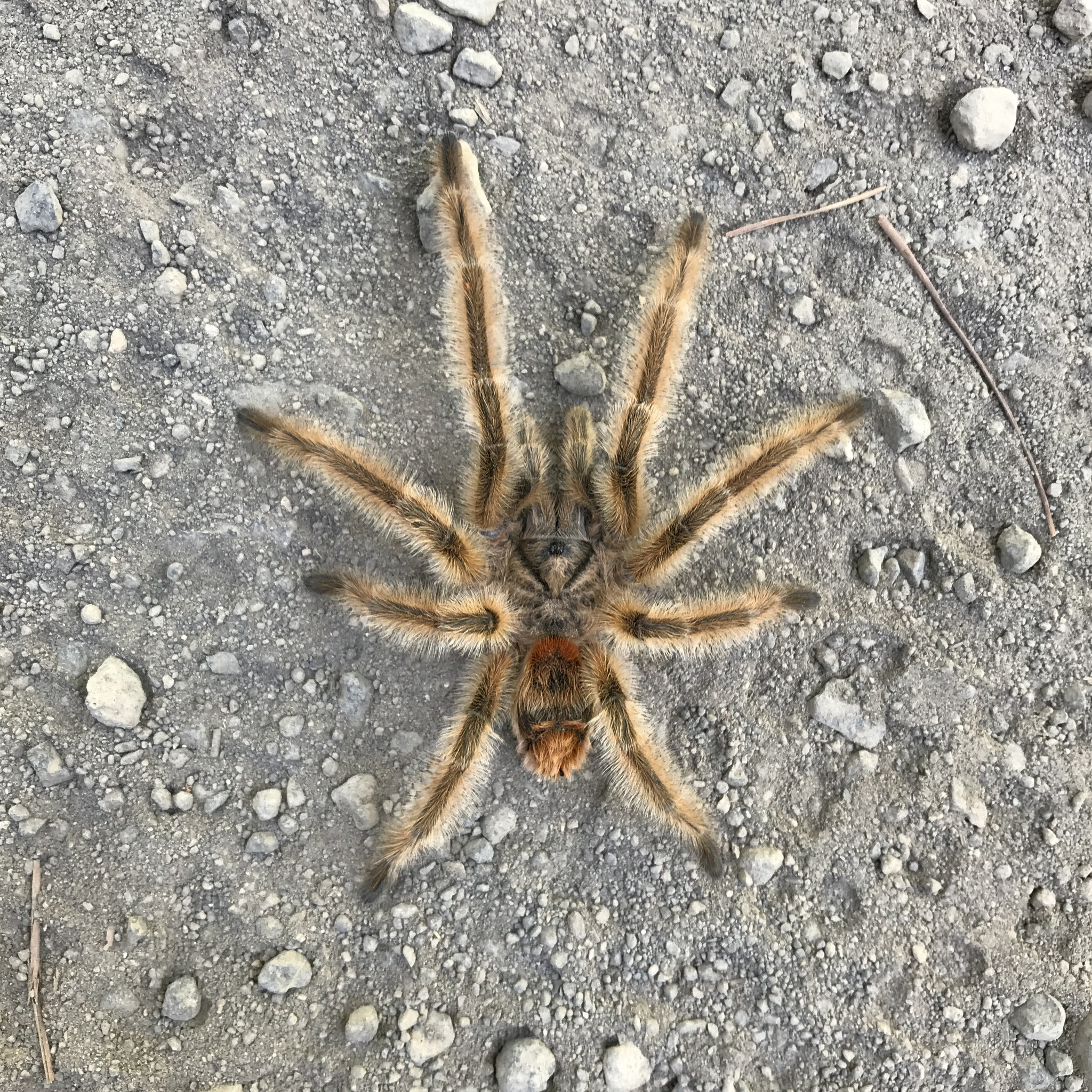
- Phrixotrichus vulpinus

Scientific classification
- Kingdom: Animalia
- Phylum: Arthropoda
- Subphylum: Chelicerata
- Class: Arachnida
- Order: Araneae
- Infraorder: Mygalomorphae
- Family: Theraphosidae
- Genus: Phrixotrichus; Simon

Species
- Phrixotrichus jara Perafán & Pérez-Miles, 2014; Phrixotrichus pucara Ferretti, 2015; Phrixotrichus scrofa (Molina, 1782); Phrixotrichus vulpinus (Karsch, 1880)

= Phrixotrichus =

Genus of spiders

P. vulpinus

Phrixotrichus is a genus of spiders in the family Theraphosidae. It was first described in 1889 by Simon. As of 2022, it contains 4 species.
