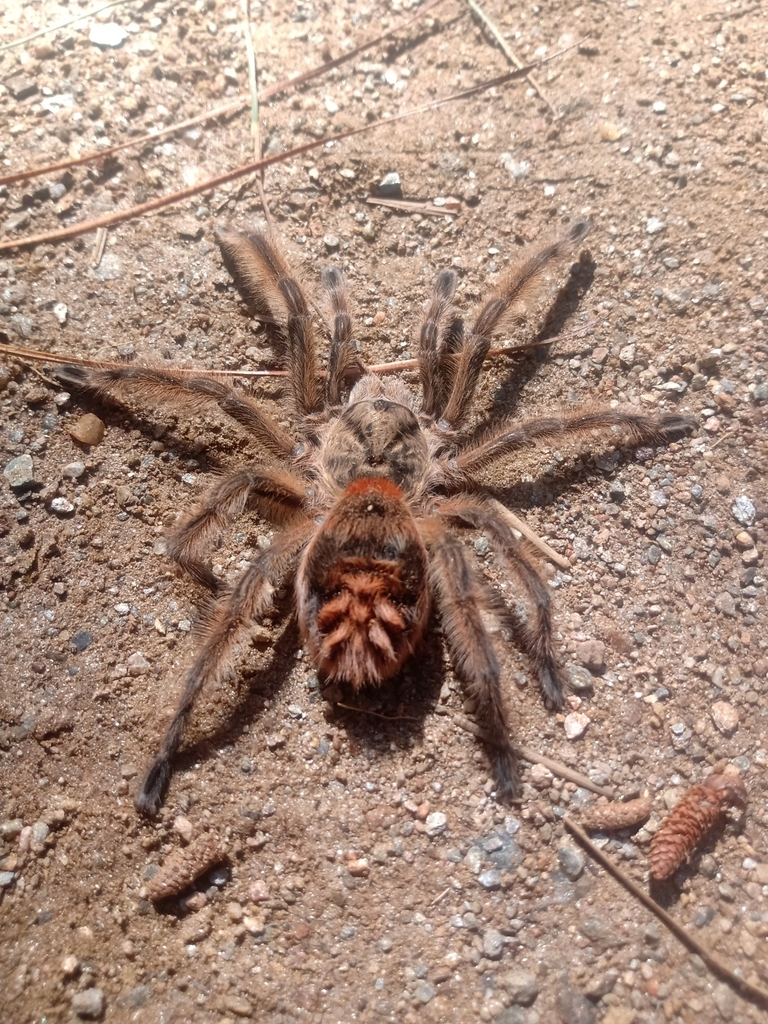

Scientific classification
- Kingdom: Animalia
- Phylum: Arthropoda
- Subphylum: Chelicerata
- Class: Arachnida
- Order: Araneae
- Infraorder: Mygalomorphae
- Family: Theraphosidae
- Genus: Phrixotrichus
- Species: P. scrofa

Binomial name
- Phrixotrichus scrofa (Molina, 1782)

Synonyms
- Aranea scrofa Molina, 1782; Mygale chilensis Molina, 1810 ?; Phrixotrichus chilensis (Molina, 1810) ?; Phrixotrichus auratus Pocock, 1903; Paraphysa scrofa (Molina, 1782)

= Phrixotrichus scrofa =

Species of tarantula

Phrixotrichus scrofa, commonly known as the Chilean copper, Chilean pink burst or Chilean violet tarantula, is a species of tarantula (family Theraphosidae). It was first described by Juan Ignacio Molina in 1782. It is native to Chile and Argentina, inhabiting mainly arid forests, and is sometimes kept as a pet.

== Description ==
In captivity, females live 25 years, while males can only live 4 to 5 years, under proper care, and getting to be roughly 10 cm (3.9 in) in size. Males are usually more colorful and vibrant. They have grey legs, reaching all the way to their trochanters, which are a copper red color. Its carapace is the same copper red color as the trochanter, with the opisthosoma being a copper red color nearest to the carapace, transitioning to a grey further away.

== Distribution and habitat ==
Phrixotrichus scrofa is native to Chile and Argentina. In Chile, they are known from some locations in the Biobío region, more specifically in Colcura and Valle de Nonguén. The average yearly temperatures in Valle de Nonguén are 14 °C, with an average rainfall of 735 mm, with some of the local vegetation being raulí, tineo and huillipatagua.

== Behavior ==
They are terrestrial tarantulas, being very active and docile, although not often, if they have enough anchor points, they may produce a web. While owning urticating hairs, they rarely use them.
