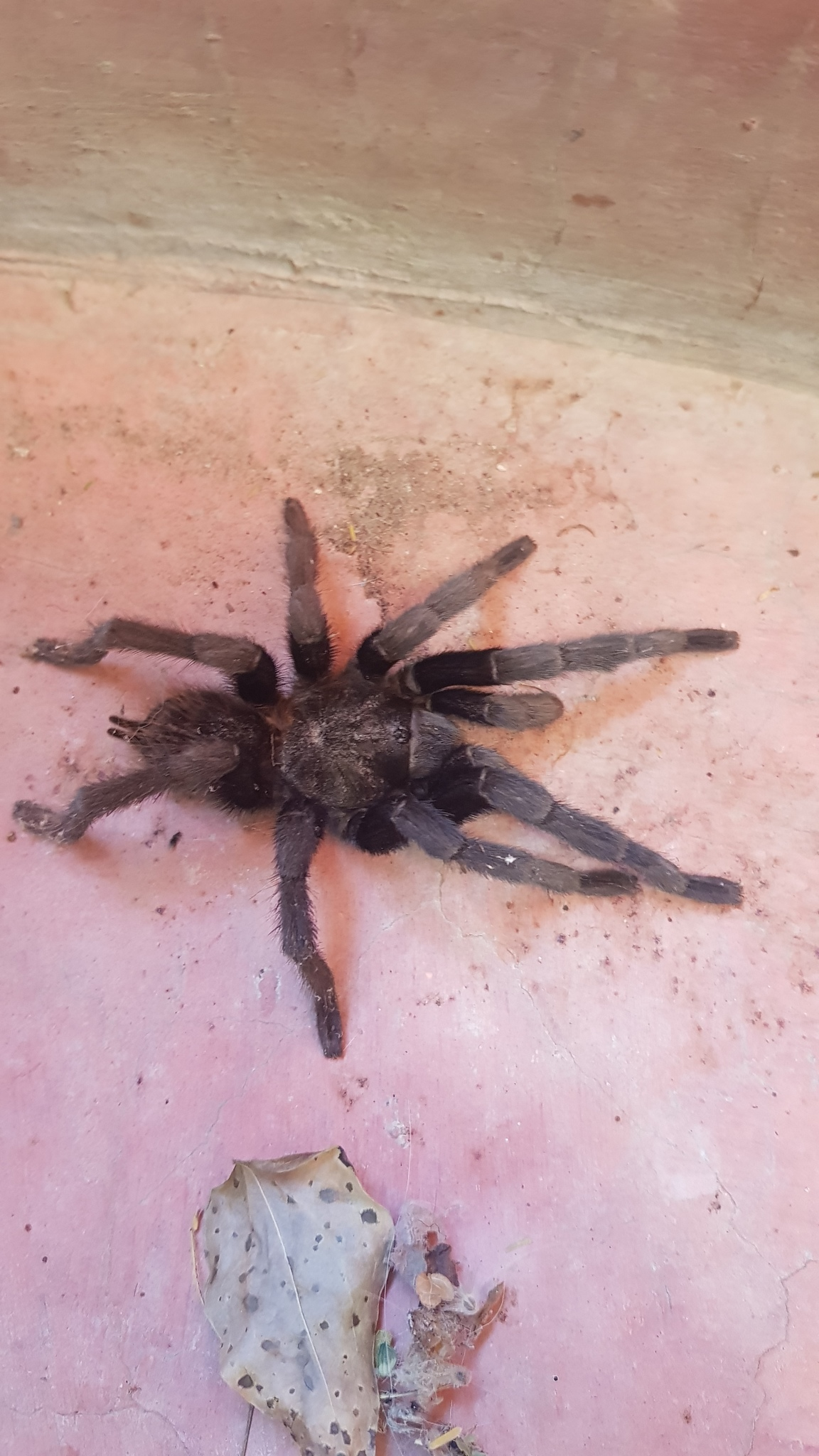

Scientific classification
- Kingdom: Animalia
- Phylum: Arthropoda
- Subphylum: Chelicerata
- Class: Arachnida
- Order: Araneae
- Infraorder: Mygalomorphae
- Family: Theraphosidae
- Genus: Tliltocatl
- Species: T. schroederi

Binomial name
- Tliltocatl schroederi (Rudloff, 2003)
- Distribution within Mexico

Synonyms
- Brachypelma schroederi Rudloff, 2003

= Tliltocatl schroederi =

Species of spider

Tliltocatl schroederi (synonym Brachypelma schroederi) is a species of spiders in the family Theraphosidae (tarantulas), found in Mexico. It is found in the central valley in Oaxaca State, Mexico.

== Description ==
Tliltocatl schroederi is of medium size for the genus; males have a total body length of around 34–36 mm, females being significantly larger at around 48 mm. The fourth leg is longest, without the coxa measuring about 61 mm in males and 47 mm in females. The overall colour is dark brown to black, without the quantity of red hairs on the border of the carapace, abdomen and legs typical of many related species. The trochanters and femora of the first pair of legs have plumose hairs. The first and second pairs of legs of the male lack spines. The eggs are fewer in number and larger than in most former Brachypelma species, producing larger and faster maturing young.

== Taxonomy ==
Tliltocatl schroederi was first described by Jan-Peter Rudloff in 2003, as Brachypelma schroederi. The specific name refers to Steffen Schröder, a spider enthusiast, who bred T. schroederi, and provided Rudloff with both observations and specimens. In November 2019, it was proposed that it be moved to the new genus Tliltocatl; this has been accepted by the World Spider Catalog.

== Distribution ==
Tliltocatl schroederi was described from specimens said to have been collected from the area around Acapulco in Mexico. However, this appears to be based on incorrect information from the dealer who supplied the specimens, and the actual distribution is Valles Centrales de Oaxaca, Oaxaca State, Mexico.

== Conservation ==
All species of Brachypelma, then including Tliltocatl, were placed on CITES Appendix II in 1994, thus restricting trade. T. schroederi was not explicitly listed, as it had not been described at the time.
