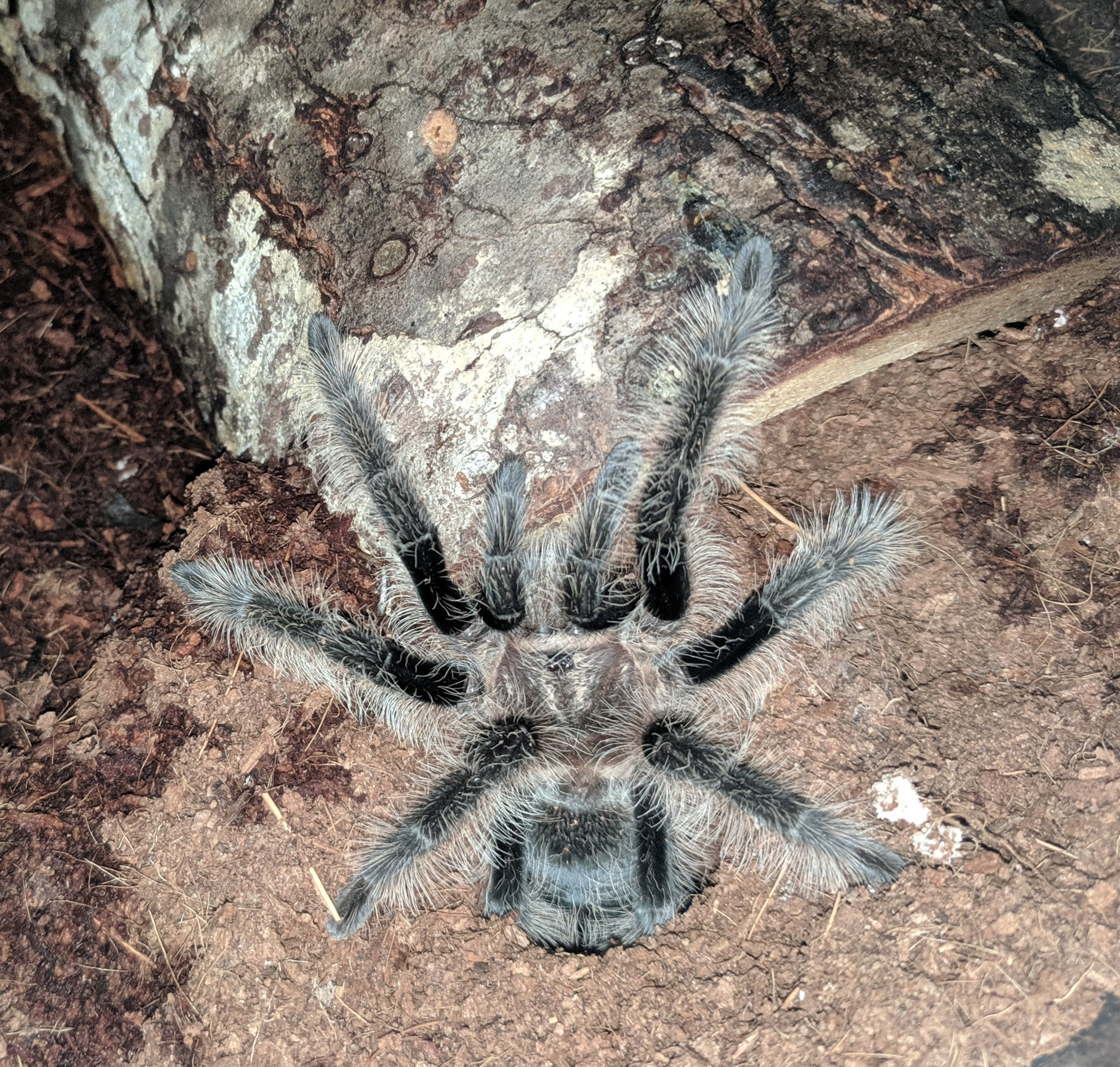
- Young adult

Scientific classification
- Kingdom: Animalia
- Phylum: Arthropoda
- Subphylum: Chelicerata
- Class: Arachnida
- Order: Araneae
- Infraorder: Mygalomorphae
- Family: Theraphosidae
- Genus: Tliltocatl
- Species: T. albopilosus

Binomial name
- Tliltocatl albopilosus (Valerio, 1980)

= Tliltocatl albopilosus =

Species of spider

Tliltocatl albopilosus (previously Brachypelma albopilosum) is a species of tarantula, also known as the curlyhair tarantula. The species' native range is Costa Rica. They are largely terrestrial, opportunistically burrowing spiders.

This tarantula is covered in long bristles that have a characteristic curl to them giving them a unique look, which is why they are nick-named "curly-haired" tarantulas.

== Description ==
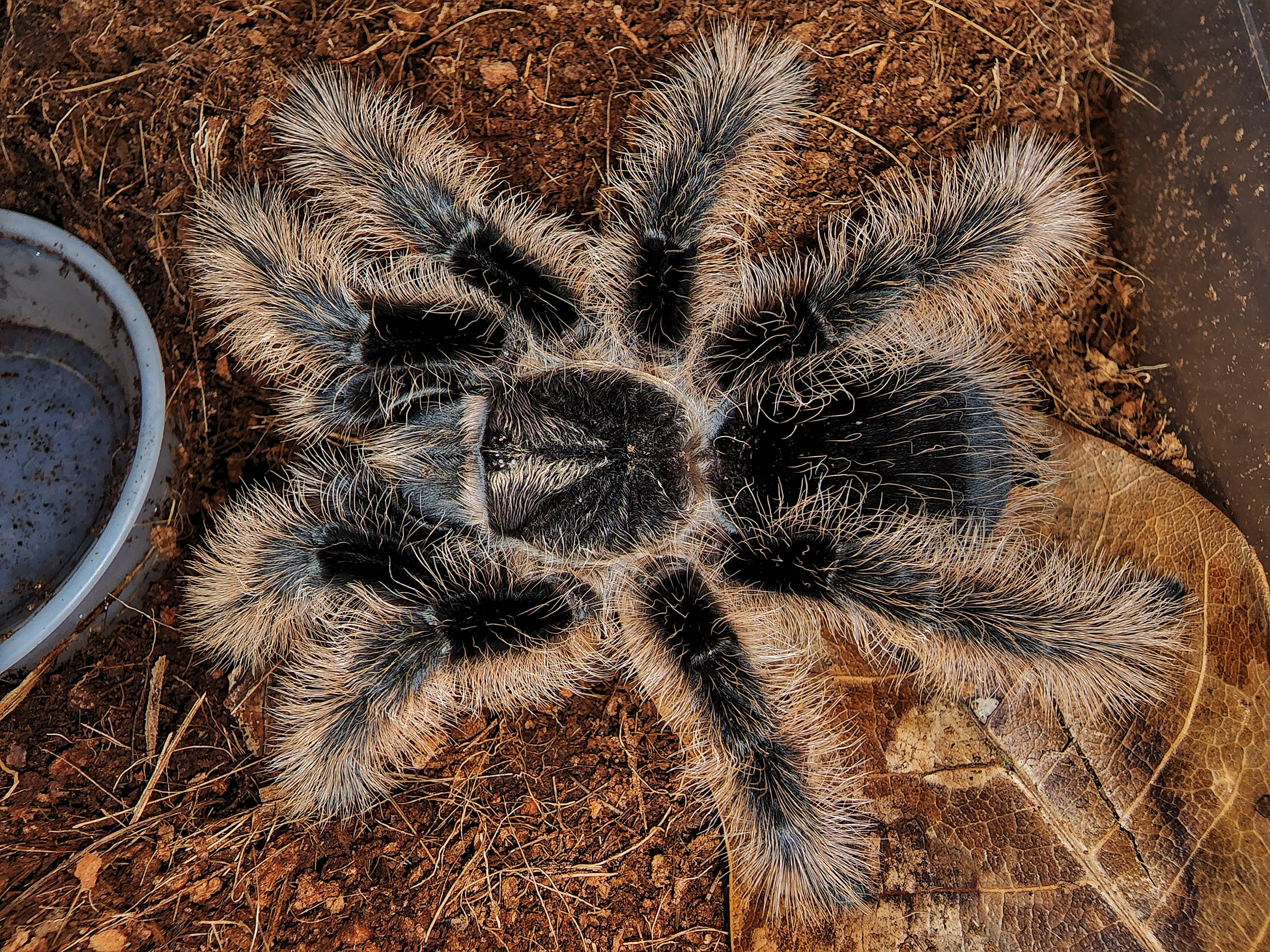
Young female

The curlyhair tarantula is a plump-bodied spider, covered with dark brown to black bristles that start light in coloration as a juvenile and darken as the tarantula ages. It has a golden-bronze sheen due to longer gold bristles that cover the whole body, which are particularly dense on the hind legs. In captivity both male and female specimens have grown to have a leg span of just over 6 inches (15 cm); however, males live a shorter life at only 5 years in captivity opposed to females reportedly living up to 20 years. Males are often a lighter bronze color than females.

== Taxonomy ==
The species was first described by Carlos Valerio in 1980, as Brachypelma "albopilosa". However, this genus name is neuter, so the species name was later corrected to albopilosum. As of November 2019, the genus Brachypelma was split into Brachypelma and Tliltocatl, with the curlyhair tarantula being a part of the latter. The genus name Tliltocatl is masculine.

== Range and habitat ==
Tliltocatl albopilosus is native to Costa Rica. A burrowing species, the curlyhair tarantula is found in tropical scrubland, either around the base of large trees, near rivers, or in patches of cleared rain forest.

== Biology ==
Receptive females will allow a male to mate, usually during the rainy season, resulting in the making of an egg sac and the laying of 300 to 500 eggs several weeks later. The egg sac is incubated for about seven to eight weeks at 24 to 27 °C (75 to 81 °F), after which pale-colored young emerge and cluster together. The spiderlings develop quickly, molting again over the next couple of weeks, by which time they disperse to live independent lives. Unreceptive females are likely to be aggressive towards approaching males and may try to kill and eat them.

Primarily a nocturnal, opportunistic ambusher, the curlyhair tarantula preys on insects and small vertebrates. An area on the end of each leg is sensitive to smell, taste and vibration, and is used to detect prey. The tarantula holds its prey with its pedipalps (front limbs) and injects it with venom delivered via two hollow fangs. This venom has a double purpose, paralysing the prey, as well as beginning digestion. Once the venom has acted the tarantula is able to suck up the proteins and fats of its prey, leaving just a small ball of undigested body parts. This usually docile tarantula will kick hairs off the abdomen with its hind legs when threatened, which cause blindness if they hit the eyes of a predator and can also cause a rash on the skin.

== Conservation ==
The largest threat to the curlyhair tarantula is now habitat loss. Once captured in large numbers for the international pet trade, the curlyhair tarantula is now bred in captivity worldwide and relatively few are caught in the wild. Listed on Appendix II of the Convention on International Trade in Endangered Species (CITES), the curlyhair tarantula can now be traded internationally only according to quotas and with trade permits.

== As pets ==
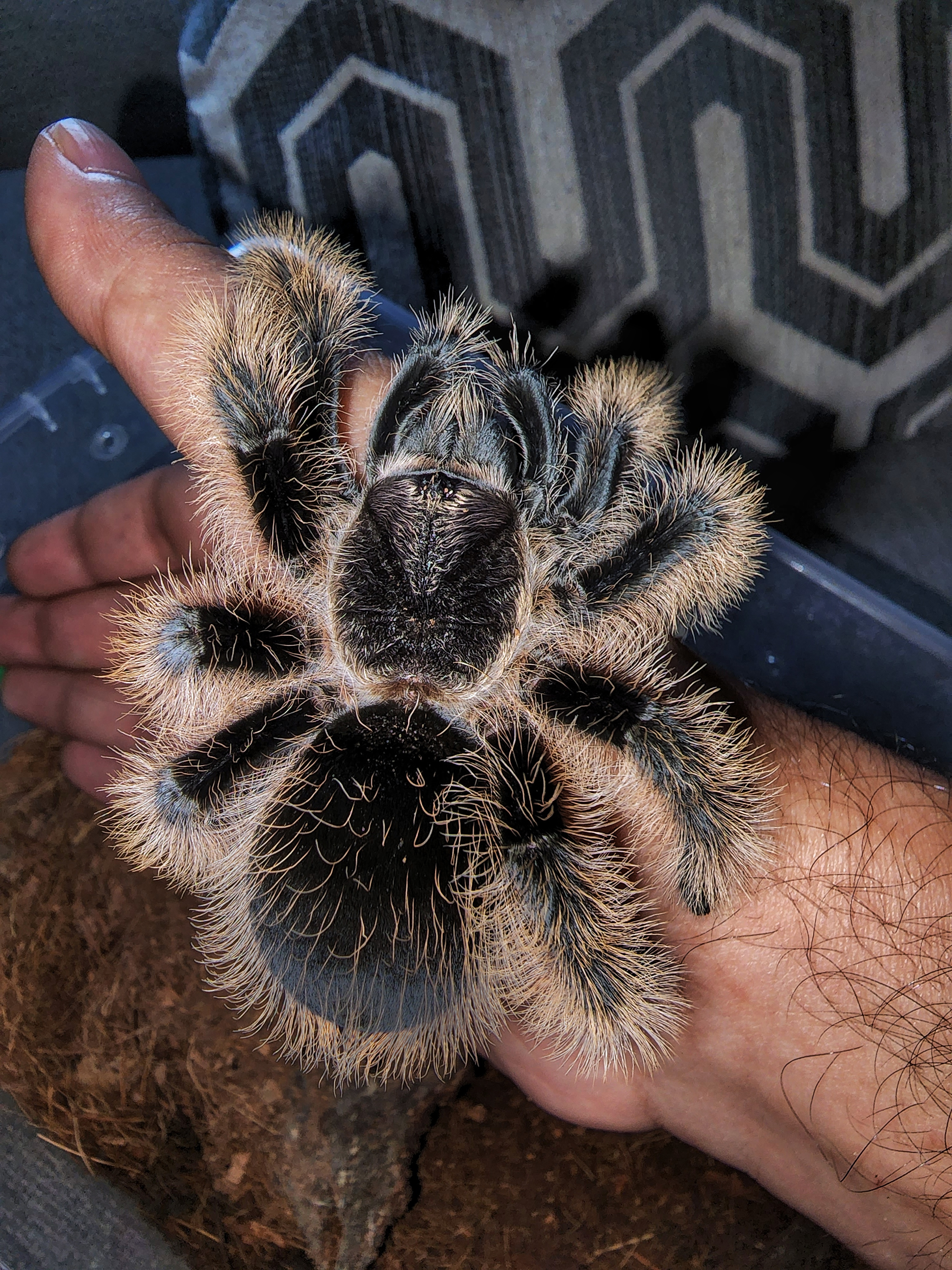
Adult female T. albopilosus handling

T. albopilosus is frequently kept and bred in captivity. They are highly adaptable to humidity and temperature changes and they feed readily on commercially available crickets, superworms, and cockroaches. They are typically docile. Females live potentially between 8–25 years of age and Males roughly 4–5 years.

== Gallery ==
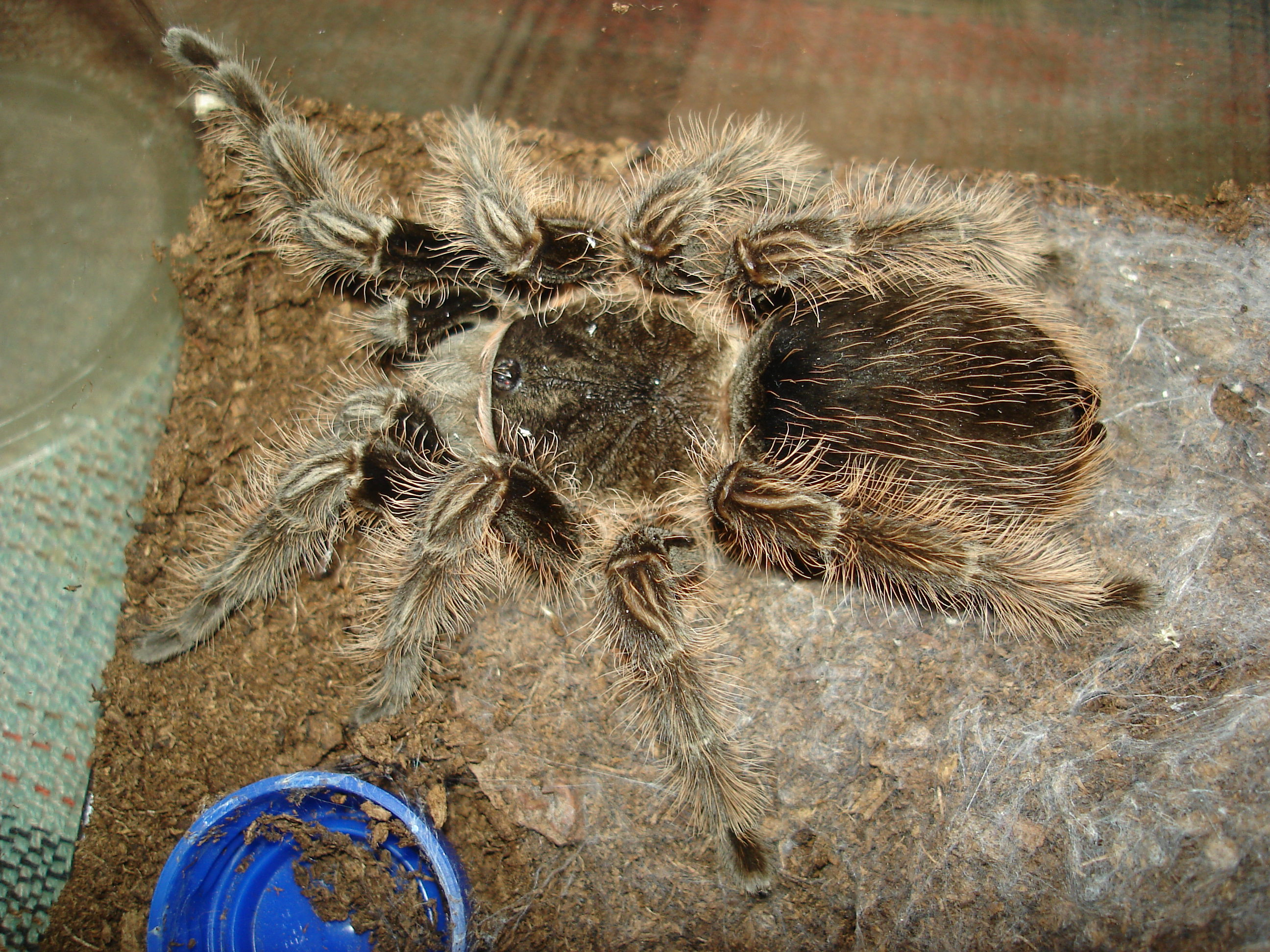
An adult

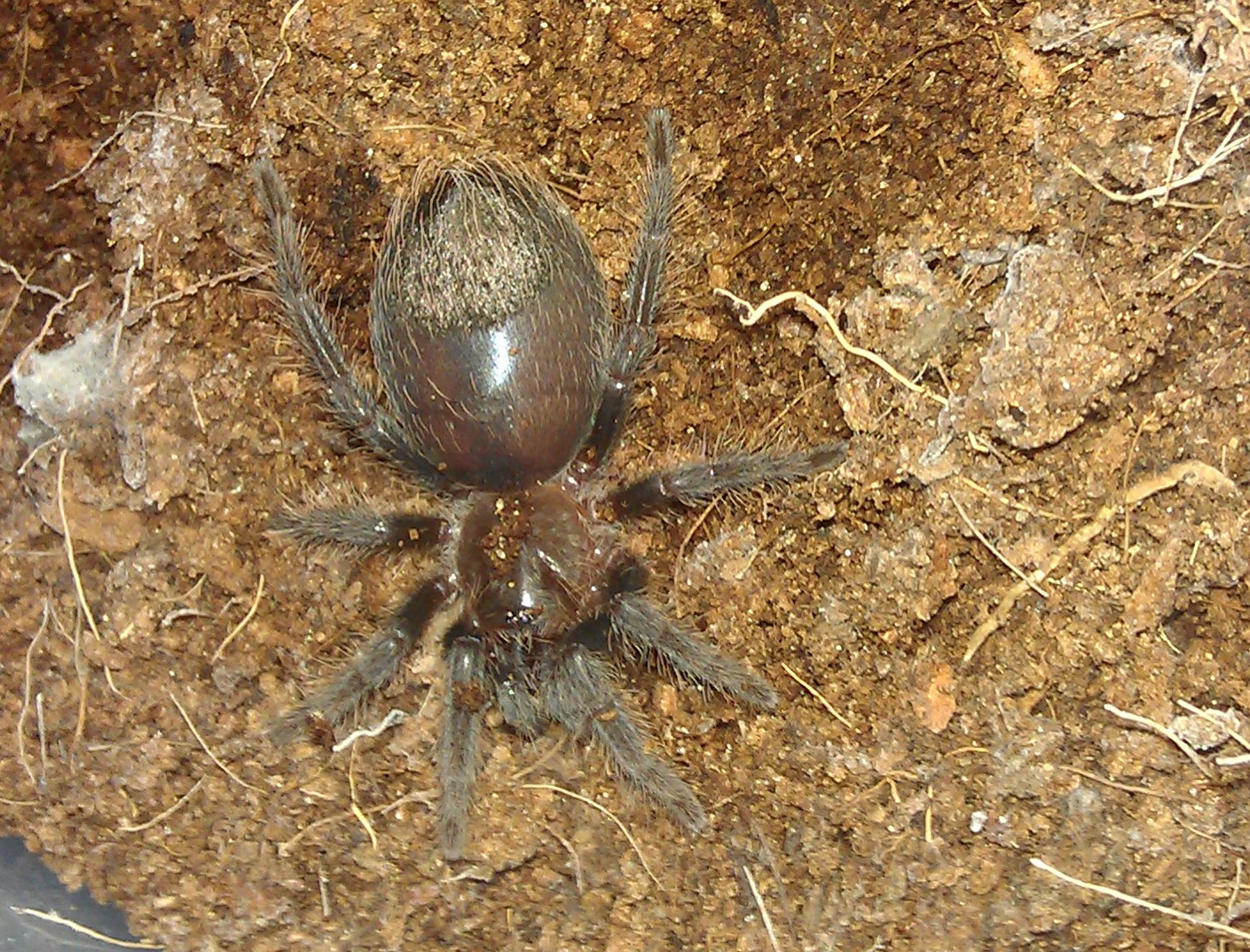
A spiderling

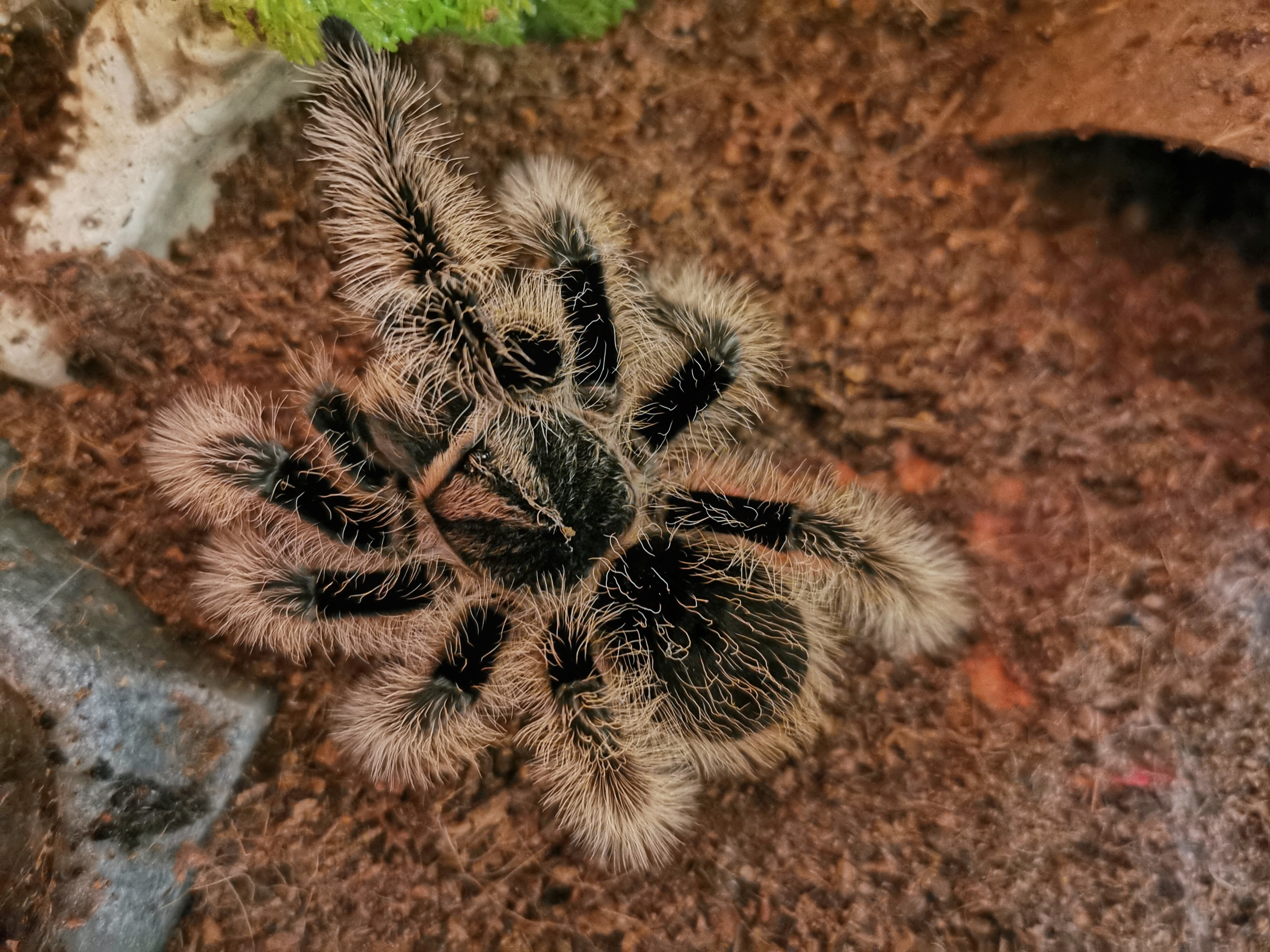
Young female, Nicaragua

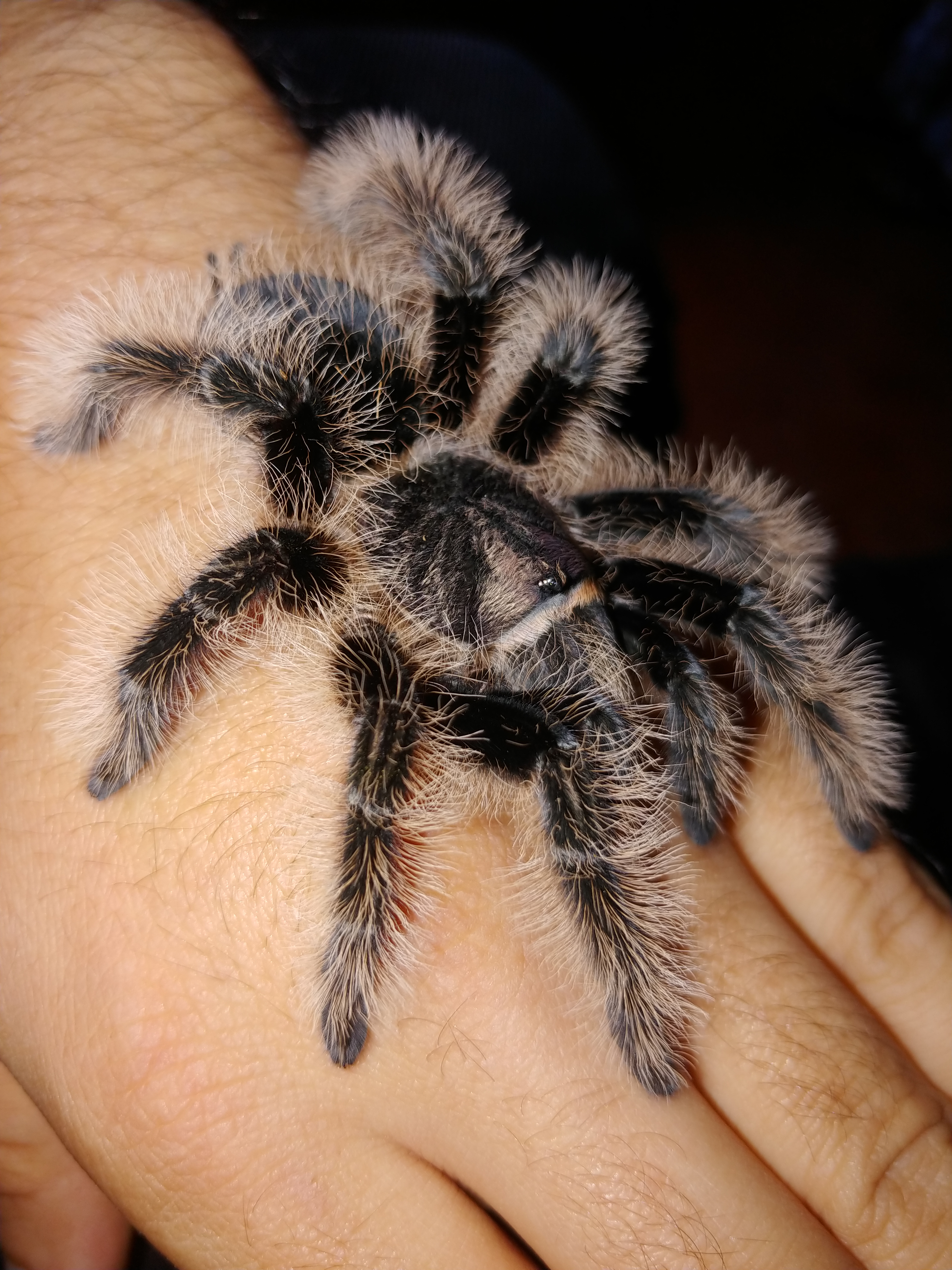
Nicaraguan specimen
