= Aphonopelma pallidum =

Conservation status
- CITES Appendix II

Scientific classification
- Kingdom: Animalia
- Phylum: Arthropoda
- Subphylum: Chelicerata
- Class: Arachnida
- Order: Araneae
- Infraorder: Mygalomorphae
- Family: Theraphosidae
- Genus: Aphonopelma
- Species: A. pallidum

Binomial name
- Aphonopelma pallidum (F. O. P.-Cambridge, 1897)

Species of spider

Aphonopelma pallidum is a tarantula of the family Theraphosidae found in Mexico. Commonly called the rose-grey, or Mexican rose, it is not available in the pet-trade.

During the late 1990s and early 2000s, and undescribed species of Brachypelma was often traded under the name pallidum, but was since formally described as Brachypelma verdezi by Schmidt 2003. The adult male has brown legs, and the carapace a dull rose grey, while the female is unknown.

Aphonopelma pallidum is listed as "threatened" in Mexico.

Adult males have an average body 50 mm long, while the adult females divide equally 55 mm.
