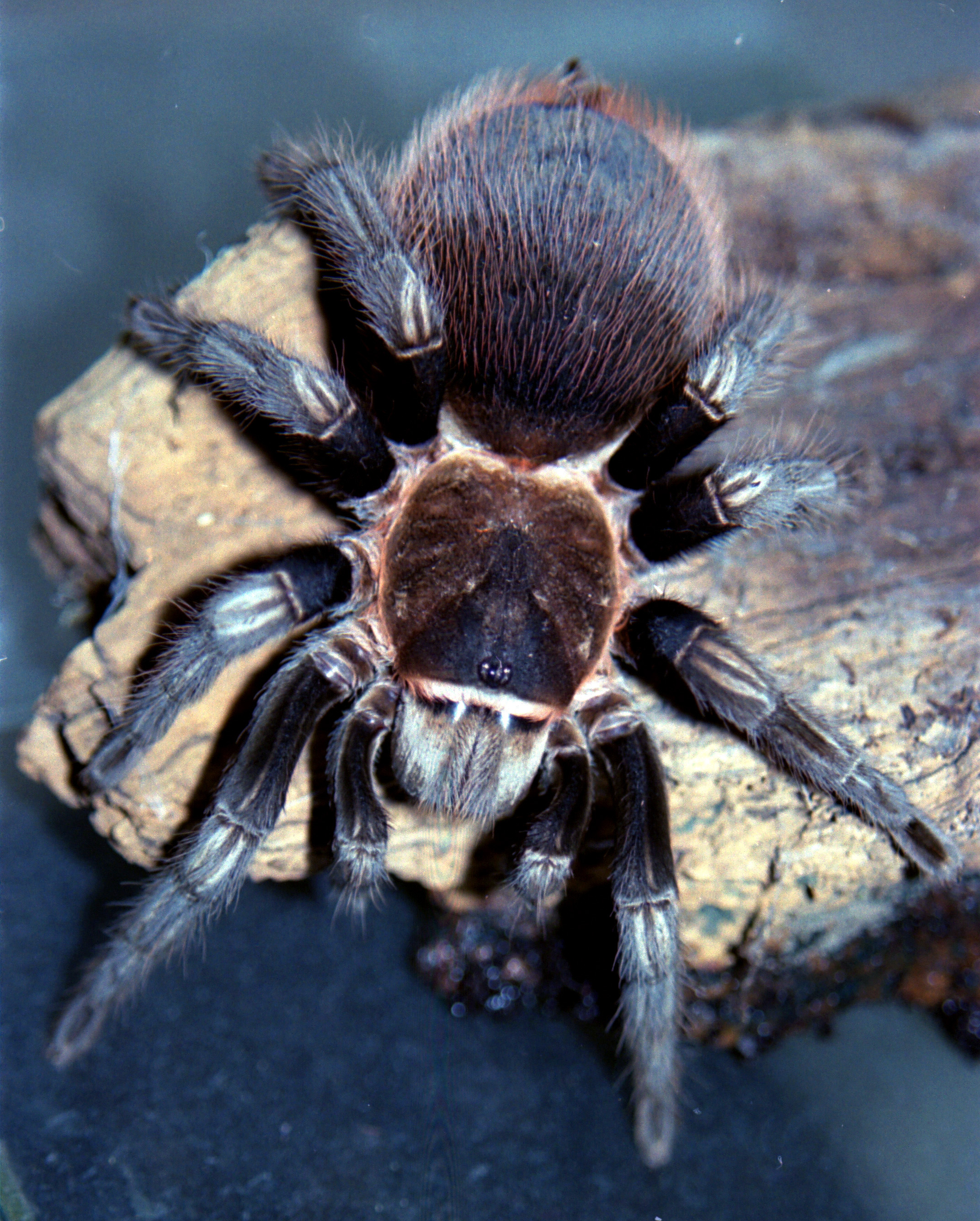
- Captive spider, probably a female of this species

Scientific classification
- Kingdom: Animalia
- Phylum: Arthropoda
- Subphylum: Chelicerata
- Class: Arachnida
- Order: Araneae
- Infraorder: Mygalomorphae
- Family: Theraphosidae
- Genus: Tliltocatl
- Species: T. sabulosus

Binomial name
- Tliltocatl sabulosus (F. O. Pickard-Cambridge, 1897)

Synonyms
- Brachypelma sabulosum (F. O. Pickard-Cambridge, 1897); Eurypelma sabulosum F. O. Pickard-Cambridge, 1897; Delopelma sabulosum (F. O. Pickard-Cambridge, 1897)

= Tliltocatl sabulosus =

Species of spider

Tliltocatl sabulosus (synonym Brachypelma sabulosum) is a species of spider in the family Theraphosidae (tarantulas), found in Guatemala.

== Description ==
Tliltocatl sabulosus is a large tarantula, females having a total body length of around 65–70 mm. The fourth leg is the longest at around 75 mm. It is generally black in colour, with scattered red hairs on the abdomen.

== Taxonomy ==
Tliltocatl sabulosus was first described, as Eurypelma sabulosum, by F. O. Pickard-Cambridge in 1897. It was transferred to the genus Brachypelma in 1989. In 2019, it was proposed that it be moved to the new genus Tliltocatl; this has been accepted by the World Spider Catalog.

== Distribution ==
Tliltocatl sabulosus was originally collected around Tikal in northern Guatemala.

== Conservation ==
All species of Brachypelma, then including Tliltocatl, including T. sabulosus, were placed on CITES Appendix II in 1994, thus restricting trade.
