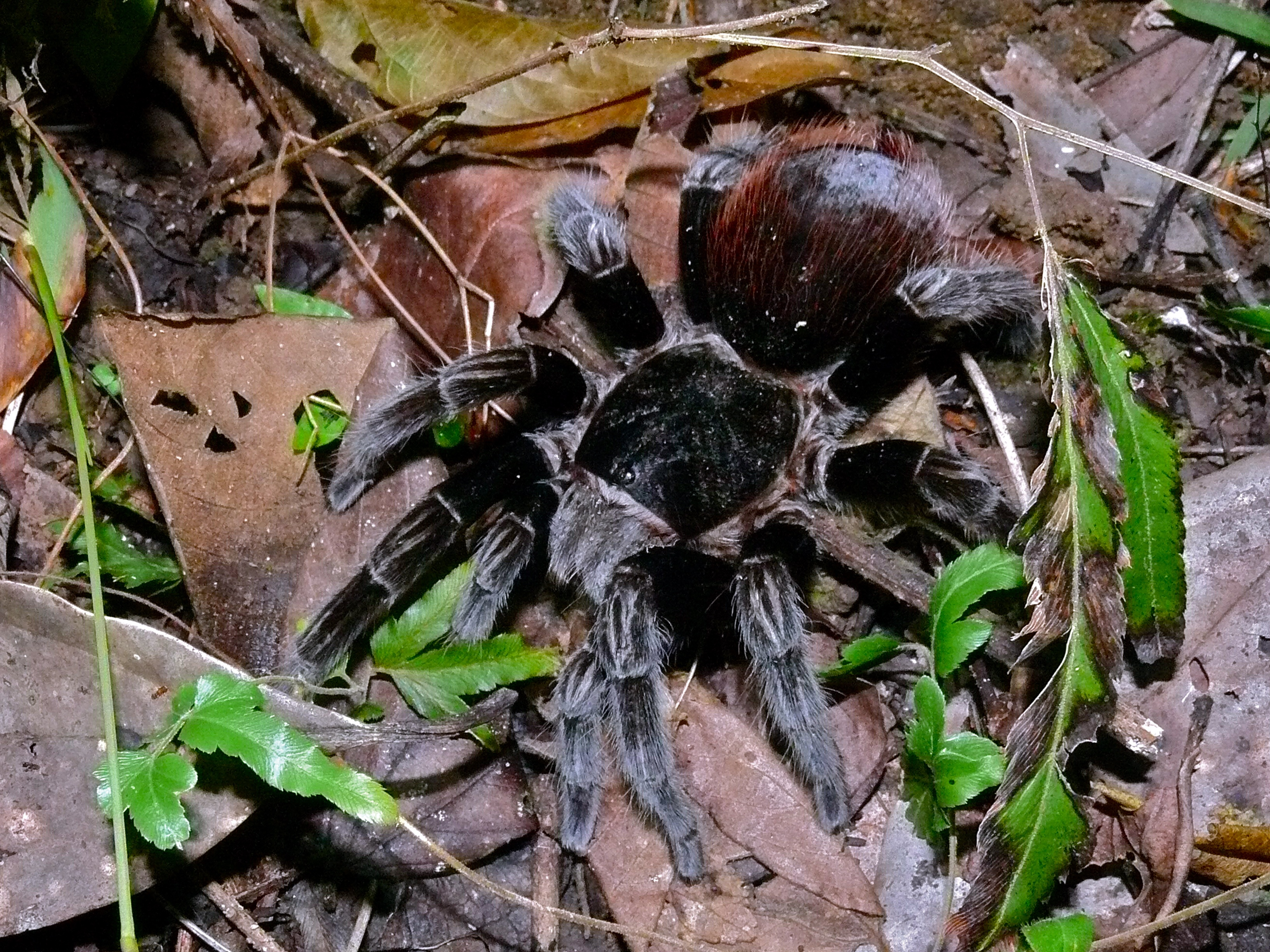
- In habitat in Belize

Scientific classification
- Kingdom: Animalia
- Phylum: Arthropoda
- Subphylum: Chelicerata
- Class: Arachnida
- Order: Araneae
- Infraorder: Mygalomorphae
- Family: Theraphosidae
- Genus: Tliltocatl
- Species: T. vagans

Binomial name
- Tliltocatl vagans (Ausserer, 1875)

Synonyms
- Brachypelma vagans (Ausserer, 1875); Eurypelma vagans Ausserer, 1875; Eurypelma dupontii Becker, 1879

= Tliltocatl vagans =

Species of spider

Tliltocatl vagans (synonym Brachypelma vagans) is a species of tarantula known commonly as the Mexican red rump. It ranges predominantly in Mexico (including the Yucatán Peninsula), but is also found in Central America. They are terrestrial, burrowing spiders. The reason for the name red rump is because of its distinctive red hairs on its abdomen. Like most tarantulas, they will eat anything they can overpower, which is usually insects, but small lizards and rodents may also be consumed. They can grow up to a solid 6.5 inch leg span, with males typically being smaller and thinner than the females. They prefer shrubland habitats.

In 1996, Tliltocatl vagans was discovered in the wild in St. Lucie County, Florida. It is now considered an established non-native species in that state, where it is thought to have been introduced through either accidental or intentional releases of specimens imported via the pet trade, although their numbers have been dwindling due to many T. vagans eating insects poisoned by pesticides.

Distribution of confirmed specimens of Tliltocatl species █ Tliltocatl vagans

== Taxonomy ==
The genus Brachypelma was split up, with this species moving to become Tliltocatl vagans. The move is accepted by the World Spider Catalog.

== In captivity ==
T. vagans is frequently kept and bred in captivity. They are typically docile, though they can be skittish and prone to releasing urticating hairs. Females are long-lived, potentially reaching 25–40 years of age. Due to its popularity in the pet trade, T. vagans is listed under appendix II of CITES (under its former name) to prevent illegal removal and international trade. This trade, combined with habitat destruction and a high rate of mortality prior to sexual maturity, means that T. vagans is considered vulnerable to extinction.

== In traditional Mayan medicine ==
The Ch'ol Maya consider these spiders to be positive, and use them medicinally. A hierbatero kills it, then crushes it, mixes it with spirit alcohol and strains out any irritating hairs with a traditional cloth. The beverage is used for the treatment of "tarantula wind", the symptoms being chest pain, coughing and asthma. The venom peptide GsMtx-4 is being investigated for the possible treatment of cardiac arrhythmia, muscular dystrophy and glioma.

== Gallery ==
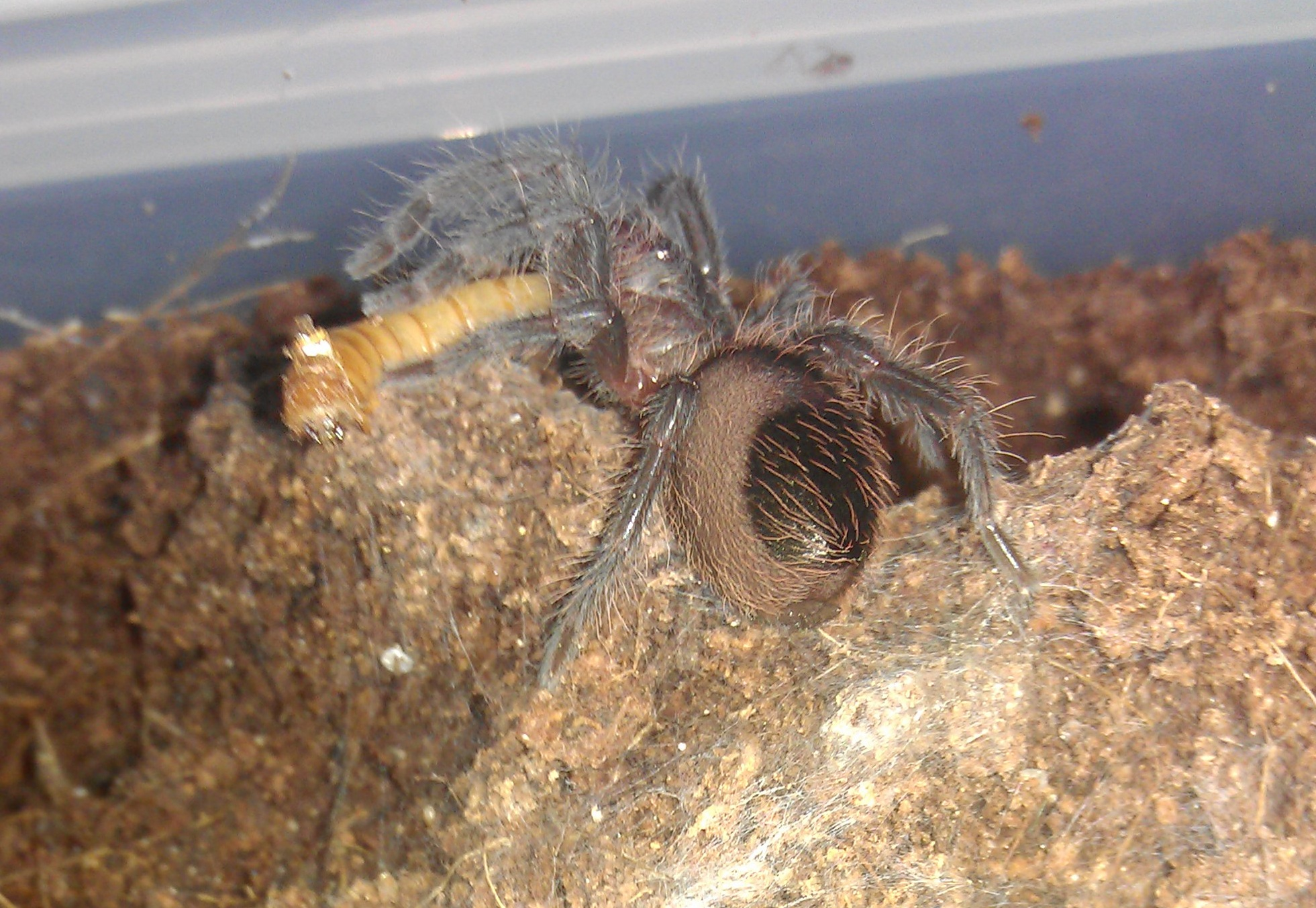
Juvenile feeding on a mealworm

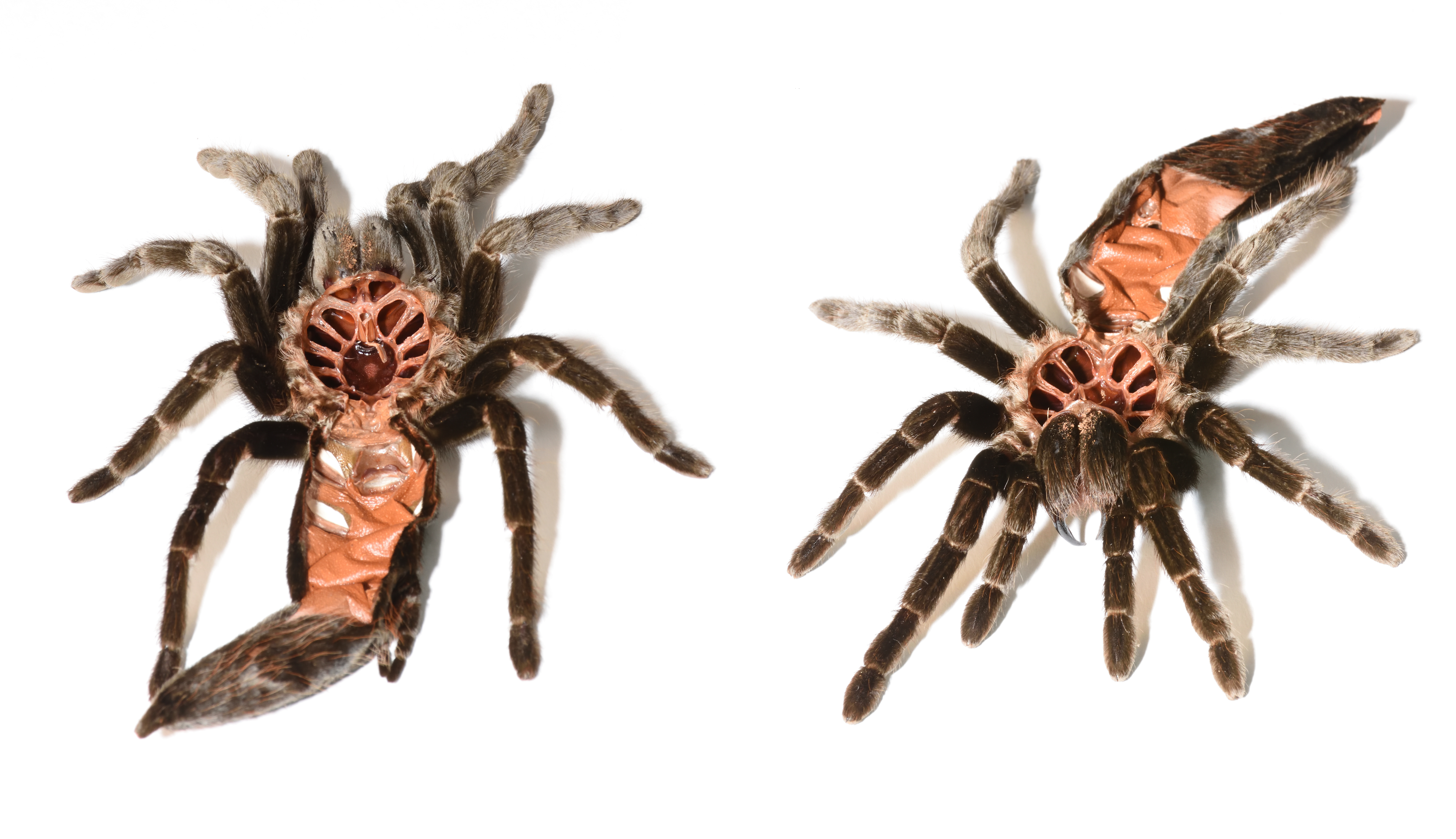
Exoskeleton

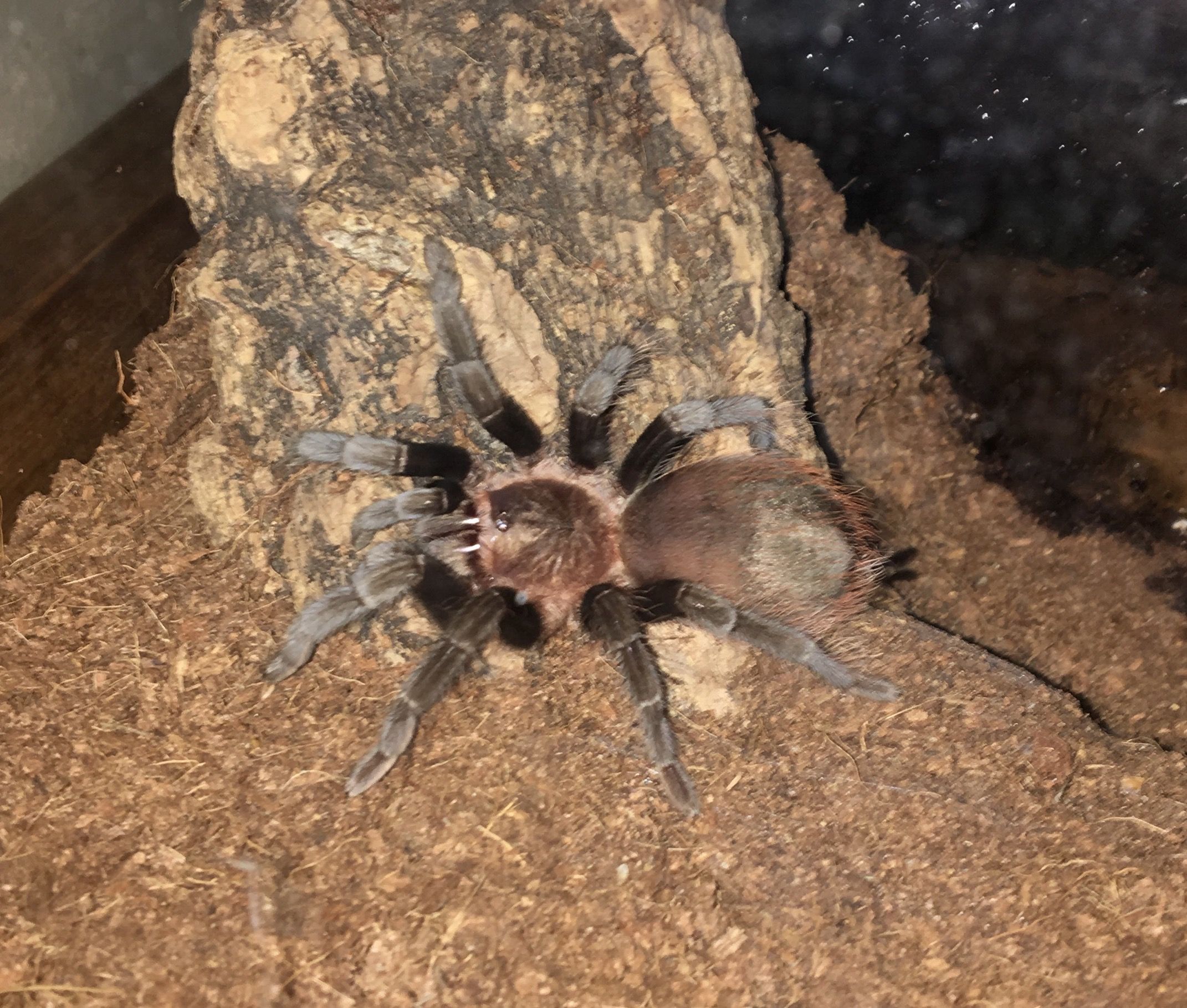
Adult

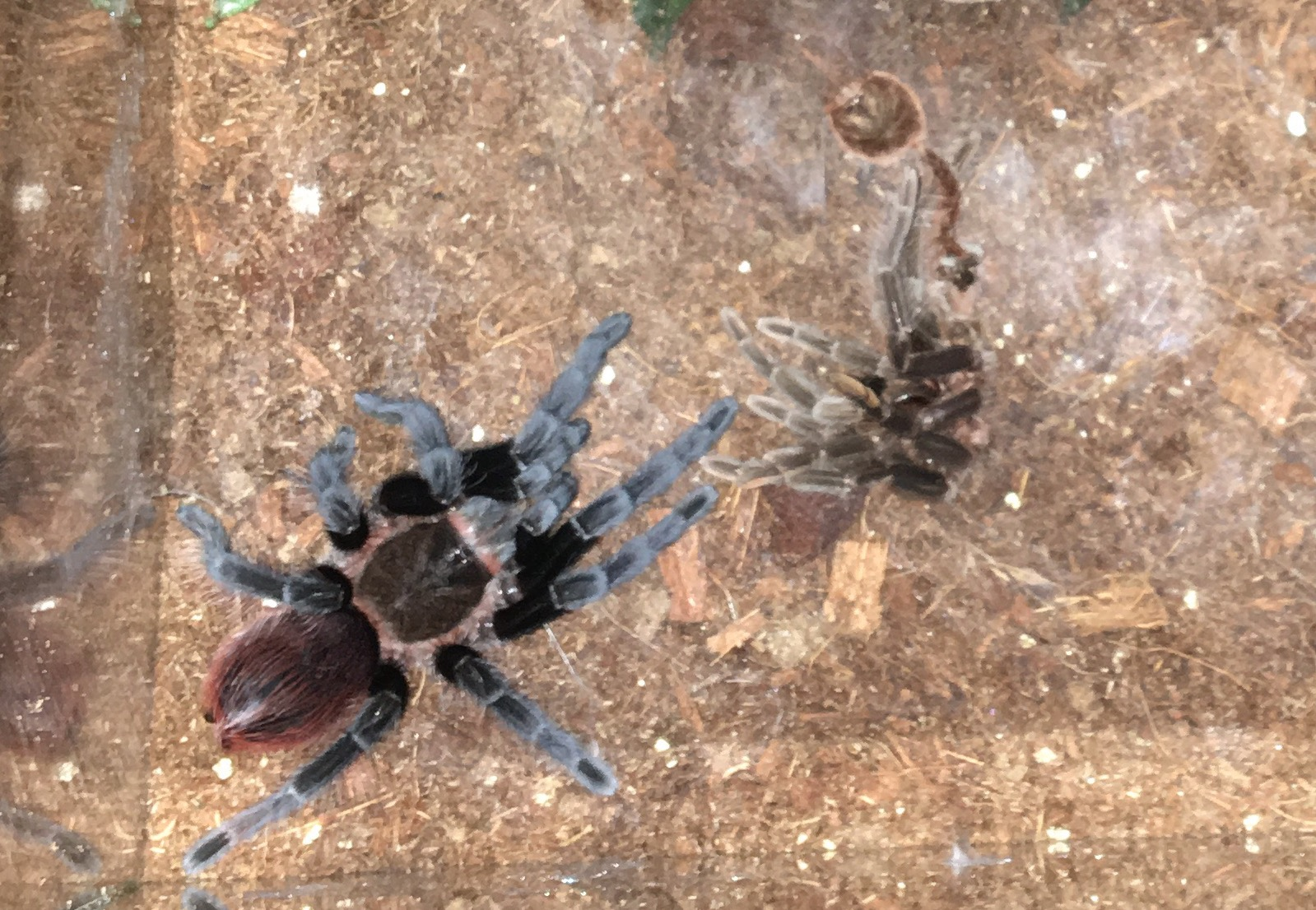
Freshly molted

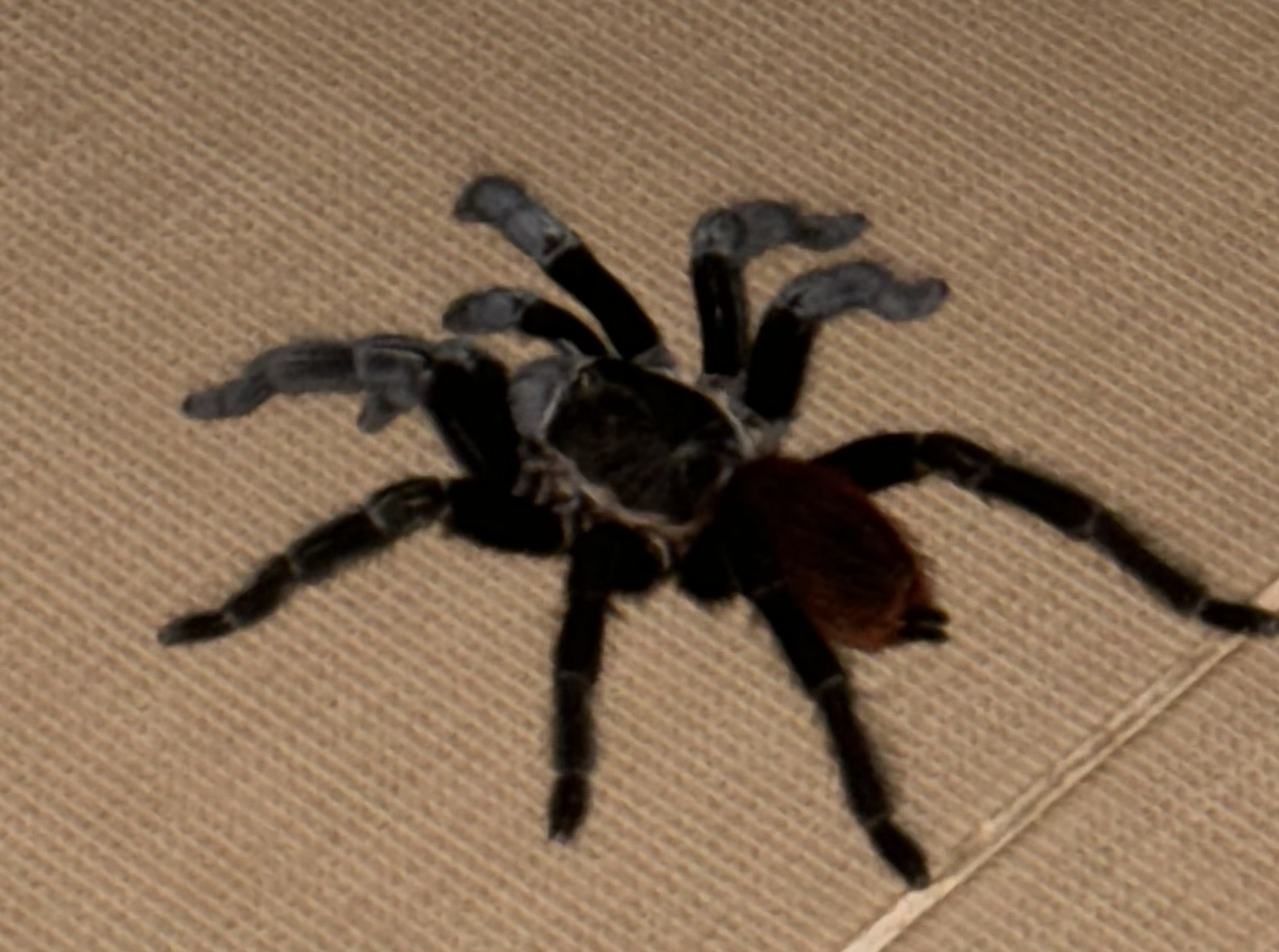
Tliltocatl vagans, near Palenque, Chiapas, Mexico
