= Magnacrus =

Scientific classification
- Kingdom: Animalia
- Phylum: Arthropoda
- Subphylum: Chelicerata
- Class: Arachnida
- Order: Araneae
- Infraorder: Mygalomorphae
- Family: Theraphosidae
- Genus: Magnacrus; Hoang, Yu, Wendt, West & von Wirth, 2025

Type species
- Citharognathus tongmianensis Zhu, Li & Song, 2002

Species
- 2, see text

Genus of spiders

Magnacrus is a genus of spiders in the family Theraphosidae.

== Distribution ==
Magnacrus is known from Vietnam and possibly China.

== Species ==
As of October 2025, this genus includes two species:

- Magnacrus taynguyenensis Hoang, Yu, Wendt, West & von Wirth, 2025 – Vietnam
- Magnacrus tongmianensis (Zhu, Li & Song, 2002) – Vietnam, China? (type species)
