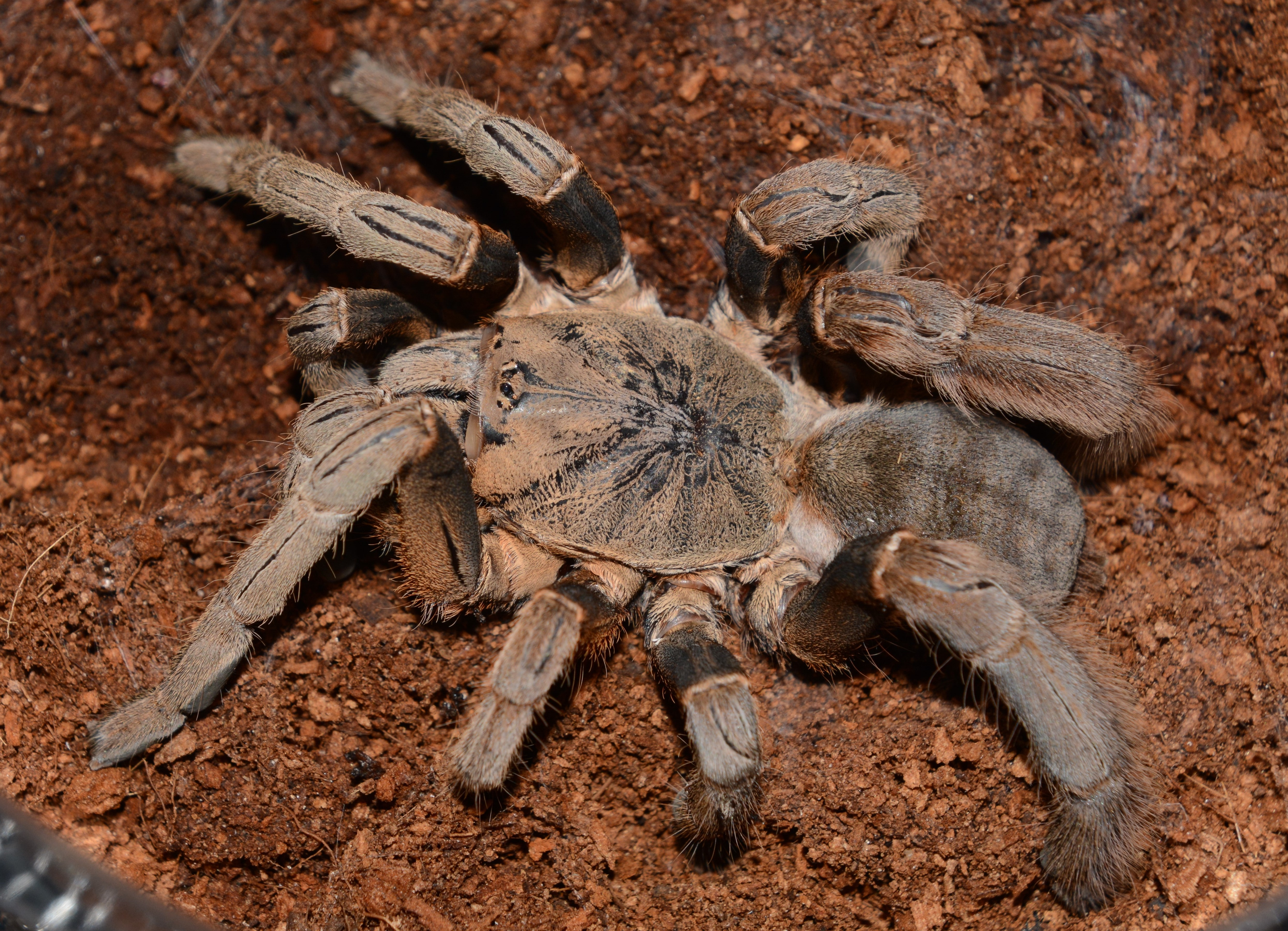

Scientific classification
- Kingdom: Animalia
- Phylum: Arthropoda
- Subphylum: Chelicerata
- Class: Arachnida
- Order: Araneae
- Infraorder: Mygalomorphae
- Family: Theraphosidae
- Genus: Magnacrus
- Species: M. tongmianensis

Binomial name
- Magnacrus tongmianensis Zhu, Li & Song, 2002

Synonyms
- Citharognathus tongmianensis

= Magnacrus tongmianensis =

Species of tarantula

Magnacrus tongmianensis (formerly known as Citharognathus tongmianensis) is a tarantula species found in China.
