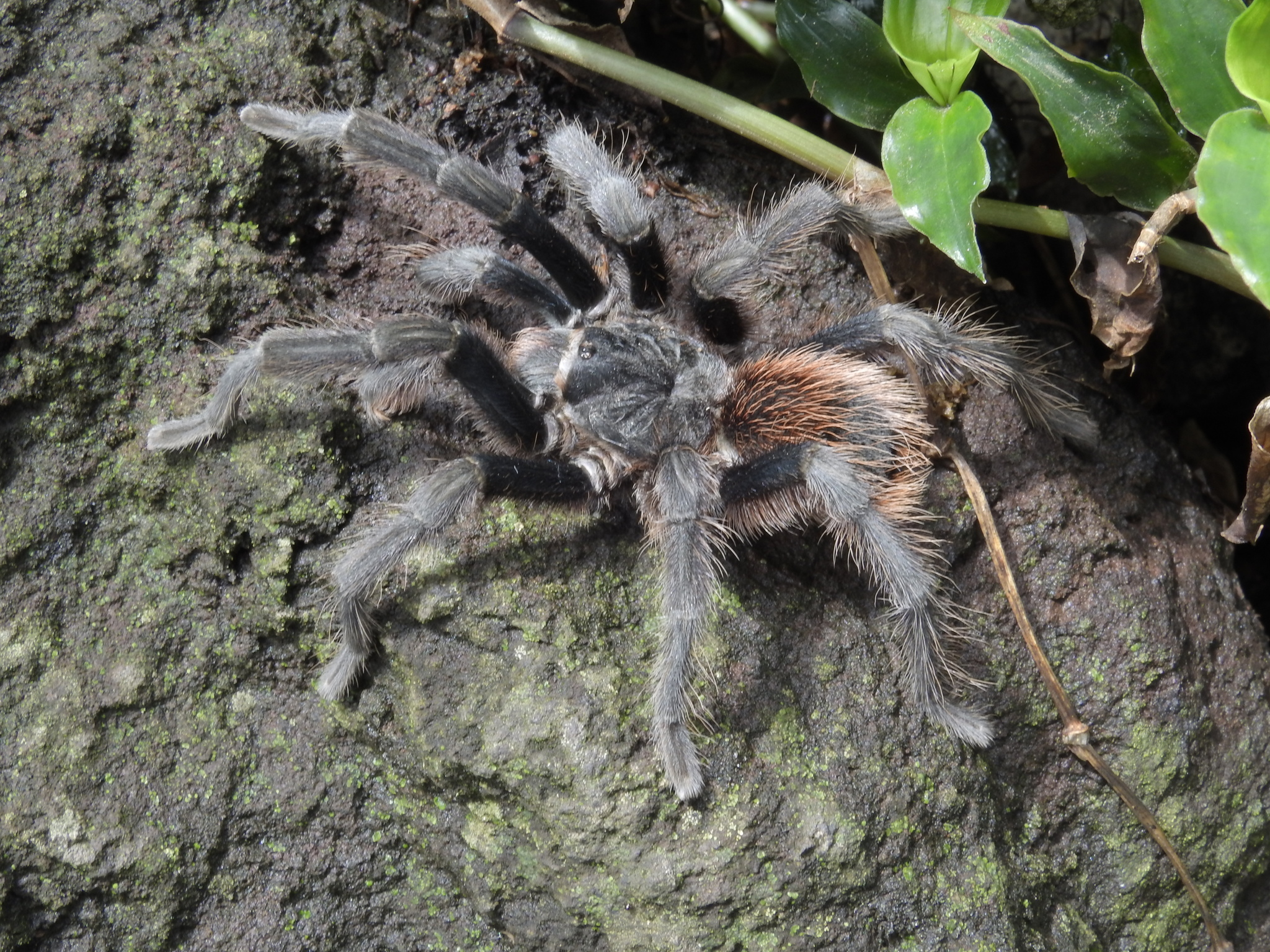

Scientific classification
- Kingdom: Animalia
- Phylum: Arthropoda
- Subphylum: Chelicerata
- Class: Arachnida
- Order: Araneae
- Infraorder: Mygalomorphae
- Family: Theraphosidae
- Genus: Dugesiella
- Species: D. anitahoffmannae

Binomial name
- Dugesiella anitahoffmannae Locht et al., 2005

= Dugesiella anitahoffmannae =

Species of spider

Dugesiella anitahoffmannae is a species of spider in the family Theraphosidae, found in Mexico.
