= Dugesiella =

Scientific classification
- Kingdom: Animalia
- Phylum: Arthropoda
- Subphylum: Chelicerata
- Class: Arachnida
- Order: Araneae
- Infraorder: Mygalomorphae
- Family: Theraphosidae
- Genus: Dugesiella; Pocock, 1901

Type species
- Dugesiella crinita Pocock, 1901

Genus of tarantulas

Dugesiella is a genus of tarantulas. It contains four species, with Dugesiella crinita as the type species.

== Species ==
Dugesiella contains the following species:

- Dugesiella anitahoffmannae (Locht, Medina, Rojo & Vázquez, 2005)
- Dugesiella crinita type species Pocock, 1901
- Dugesiella duplex (Chamberlin, 1925)
- Dugesiella serrata (Simon, 1891)
