= Jingzhaotoxin =

Protein from Chinese tarantula venom

Jingzhaotoxin proteins are part of a venom secreted by Chilobrachys jingzhao, the Chinese tarantula. and act as neurotoxins. There are several subtypes of jingzhaotoxin, which differ in terms of channel selectivity and modification characteristics. All subspecies act as gating modifiers of sodium channels and/or, to a lesser extent, potassium channels.

== Sources ==
Chilobrachys jingzhao, also known as the Chinese earth tiger tarantula or Chilobrachys guangxiensis, can be found in China and Asia. This large tarantula belongs to the family of Theraphosidae.

== Chemistry ==
Jingzhaotoxins reported on this page are 29-36-residue polypeptides with varying numbers of stabilizing disulfide bridges.

== Target ==
TTX-S Na^{+} channels	JZTX-I. JZTX-II, JZTX-IV, JZTX-V, JZTX-34, JZTX-IX
TTX-R Na^{+} channels	JZTX-II, JZTX-III, JZTX-IV, JZTX-V, JZTX-IX, JZTX-XI
Kv2.1	JZTX-I, JZTX-III, JZTX-IX, JZTX-XI
Kv4.1	JZTX-I, JZTX-XII
Kv4.2	JZTX-V

Jingzhaotoxins can target multiple channels. The following IC50 values have been determined:

Jingzhaotoxin	Channel	IC50
JZTX-I	Kv2.1, Kv4.1	8 μM
JZTX-II	TTX-R VGSC	260 nM
JZTX-III	TTX-R Nav1.5	300 nM
JZTX-III	Kv2.1	*
JZTX-V	TTX-R VGSC	27.6 nM
JZTX-V	TTX-S VGSC	30.2 nM
JZTX-V	Kv4.2	604 nM
JZTX-XI	VGSC	**
JZTX-XI	Kv2.1	***
JZTX-XII	Kv4.1	363 nM

'*' Only a dissociation constant (Kd) was measured. Kd; 0.43 μM

'**' Only a Kd was measured. Kd; 1.28 μM

'***' Only a Kd was measured. Kd; 0.74 μM

== Mode of action ==
=== JZTX-I ===
Effect on voltage-gated sodium channels (VGSC)

JZTX-I preferentially acts on cardiac sodium channels, but also affects tetrodotoxin-sensitive (TTX-S) voltage-gated sodium channels (VGSC) in dorsal root ganglion (DRG) neurons. It modifies the sodium current by inhibiting channel inactivation and speeding up recovery after inactivation. JZTX-I does not affect the activation threshold of sodium channels.

Effect on potassium channels

JZTX-I has a modest effect on potassium currents by slowing the rate of activation of Kv2.1 and Kv4.1 channels and increasing the tail current deactivation.

=== JZTX-II ===
Effect on VGSC

JZTX-II has high affinity to the tetrodotoxin-resistant (TTX-R) VGSC in cardiac myocytes where it significantly slows rapid inactivation. Although JZTX-II does not have an effect on TTX-R neuronal channels in DRG neurons it does affect TTX-S sodium currents by slowing down their inactivation.

Effect on potassium channels

At this point, the effects of JZTX-II on potassium channels are unknown.

=== JZTX-III ===
Effect on VGSC

JZTX-III has a high affinity to the TTX-R Nav1.5 voltage gated sodium channel which is expressed in cardiac myocytes but not in neurons. It modifies the sodium channel current by shifting its activation curve to a more depolarized voltage without affecting its inactivation curve. JZTX-II is docked to the Nav1.5 DIIS3-4 linker, which is responsible for its high selectivity.

Effect on potassium channels

JZTX-III modifies the voltage gated Kv2.1 potassium channel in cardiac myocytes and can bind to both open and closed channels. It modifies the gating of Kv2.1 channel by shifting the activation curve to a more depolarized voltage and by speeding up deactivation.

=== JZTX-IV ===
Effect on VGSC

JZTX-IV acts on TTX-S sodium channels in DRG neurons by weakly reducing peak amplitudes and by obviously slowing inactivation kinetics. In contrast, JZTX-IV acts on TTX-R sodium channels on cardiac myocytes by obviously reducing its peak current and by weakly slowing inactivation kinetics. Additionally, JZTX-IV shifts the steady-state inactivation curve on both receptors. Even at high concentrations, JZTX-IV does not have any effect on TTX-R sodium channels on rat DRG neurons or on TTX-S sodium channels on hippocampal neurons.

Effect on potassium channels

At this point, the effects of JZTX-IV on potassium channels are largely unknown.

=== JZTX-V ===
Effect on VGSC

JZTX-V has a high affinity to the resting closed state of TTX-R (Nav1.8 Nav1.9) and TTX-S (Nav1.6, Nav1.7) VGSC in DRG neurons. It modifies the sodium channel current by shifting its activation curve to a more depolarized voltage and its inactivation curve to a more hyperpolarized voltage. This means that the toxin-bound sodium channel will open at a more positive membrane potential and closes at a more negative membrane potential.

Effect on potassium channels

JZTX-V mainly affects the Kv4.2 potassium channel current by shifting its activation curve to a more depolarized direction and, at high concentrations, by speeding up deactivation.

=== JZTX-IX ===
Effect on VGSC

JZTX-IX act on both TTX-R and TTX-S channels by shifting their activation state to a more depolarized voltage. In addition it captures the sodium channels at a closed state which speeds up inactivation.

Effect on potassium channels

JZTX-IX affects only the Kv2.1 channel by shifting its activation curve to a more depolarized voltage.

=== JZTX-XI ===
Effect on VGSC

JZTX-XI reduces the peak sodium current amplitude of sodium channels expressed in cardiac myocytes and slows down current inactivation. JZTX-XI shows no effects on both TTX-R and TTX-S sodium currents in dorsal root ganglion neurons

Effect on potassium channels

JZTX-XI shifts the activation curve of Kv2.1 to a more depolarized voltage and speeds up its deactivation.

=== JZTX-XII ===
Effect on VGSC

At this point, the effects of JZTX-XII on sodium channels are largely unknown.

Effect on potassium channels

JZTX-XII specifically acts on Kv4.1 potassium channels. It modulates potassium current by shifting Kv4.1 activation to more depolarized voltages and by producing a concentration-dependent slowing of activation and inactivation kinetics.

=== JZTX-34 ===
Effect on VGSC

JZTX-34 inhibits TTX-S sodium currents, but has no effect on TTX-R sodium currents. JZTX-34 does not affect activation/inactivation kinetics nor does it affect recovery rate from inactivation.

Effect on potassium channels

At this point, the effects of JZTX-34 on potassium channels are largely unknown.

== Toxicity ==
The crude venom of Chilobrachys jingzhao is lethal to mice with an intraperitoneal LD_{50} of 4.4 mg/kg. The scarce LD_{50} values that have been described for the toxins that make up the venom vary; 0.23 mg/kg (JZTX-IX) – 1.48 mg/kg (JZTX-I).

== See also ==
- Guangxitoxin
