= Μ-TRTX-Phlo1a =

Ion channel-toxin

Identifiers
3D model (JSmol)	Interactive image
- InChI: InChI=1S/C178H262N52O49S6/c1-14-89(10)142(144(183)247)228-175(278)143(92(13)233)229-164(267)118(61-95-69-193-104-34-19-16-31-101(95)104)212-161(264)121(65-138(241)242)215-158(261)117(60-94-68-192-103-33-18-15-30-100(94)103)218-174(277)141(88(8)9)227-172(275)132-82-285-284-81-131-171(274)226-128-78-281-282-79-129(222-145(248)90(11)182)169(272)204-110(40-28-54-191-178(186)187)150(253)206-111(46-48-136(237)238)153(256)210-115(58-87(6)7)156(259)209-113(56-85(2)3)147(250)196-73-134(235)195-74-135(236)200-127(168(271)221-125(75-231)165(268)203-107(37-22-25-51-180)151(254)214-122(66-139(243)244)162(265)220-126(76-232)166(269)216-123(67-140(245)246)163(266)224-131)77-280-283-80-130(223-154(257)112(47-49-137(239)240)207-155(258)114(57-86(4)5)211-159(262)119(63-97-71-188-83-197-97)208-146(249)91(12)199-167(128)270)170(273)205-109(39-27-53-190-177(184)185)149(252)201-106(36-21-24-50-179)148(251)202-108(38-23-26-52-181)152(255)219-124(62-96-70-194-105-35-20-17-32-102(96)105)176(279)230-55-29-41-133(230)173(276)217-116(59-93-42-44-99(234)45-43-93)157(260)213-120(160(263)225-132)64-98-72-189-84-198-98/h15-20,30-35,42-45,68-72,83-92,106-133,141-143,192-194,231-234H,14,21-29,36-41,46-67,73-82,179-182H2,1-13H3,(H2,183,247)(H,188,197)(H,189,198)(H,195,235)(H,196,250)(H,199,270)(H,200,236)(H,201,252)(H,202,251)(H,203,268)(H,204,272)(H,205,273)(H,206,253)(H,207,258)(H,208,249)(H,209,259)(H,210,256)(H,211,262)(H,212,264)(H,213,260)(H,214,254)(H,215,261)(H,216,269)(H,217,276)(H,218,277)(H,219,255)(H,220,265)(H,221,271)(H,222,248)(H,223,257)(H,224,266)(H,225,263)(H,226,274)(H,227,275)(H,228,278)(H,229,267)(H,237,238)(H,239,240)(H,241,242)(H,243,244)(H,245,246)(H4,184,185,190)(H4,186,187,191)/t89-,90-,91-,92+,106-,107-,108-,109-,110-,111-,112-,113-,114-,115-,116-,117-,118-,119-,120-,121-,122-,123-,124-,125-,126-,127-,128-,129-,130-,131-,132-,133-,141-,142-,143-/m0/s1 Key: PCJKXKXFKDVBRM-KMYBTFTLSA-N
- SMILES: N[C@@]([H])(C)C(=O)N[C@@]([H])(CS3)C(=O)N[C@@]([H])(CCCNC(=N)N)C(=O)N[C@@]([H])(CCC(=O)O)C(=O)N[C@@]([H])(CC(C)C)C(=O)N[C@@]([H])(CC(C)C)C(=O)NCC(=O)NCC(=O)N[C@@]([H])(CS4)C(=O)N[C@@]([H])(CO)C(=O)N[C@@]([H])(CCCCN)C(=O)N[C@@]([H])(CC(=O)O)C(=O)N[C@@]([H])(CO)C(=O)N[C@@]([H])(CC(=O)O)C(=O)N[C@@]([H])(CS5)C(=O)N[C@@]([H])(CS3)C(=O)N[C@@]([H])(C)C(=O)N[C@@]([H])(CC1=CN=C-N1)C(=O)N[C@@]([H])(CC(C)C)C(=O)N[C@@]([H])(CCC(=O)O)C(=O)N[C@@]([H])(CS4)C(=O)N[C@@]([H])(CCCNC(=N)N)C(=O)N[C@@]([H])(CCCCN)C(=O)N[C@@]([H])(CCCCN)C(=O)N[C@@]([H])(CC(=CN2)C1=C2C=CC=C1)C(=O)N1[C@@]([H])(CCC1)C(=O)N[C@@]([H])(Cc1ccc(O)cc1)C(=O)N[C@@]([H])(CC1=CN=C-N1)C(=O)N[C@@]([H])(CS5)C(=O)N[C@@]([H])(C(C)C)C(=O)N[C@@]([H])(CC(=CN2)C1=C2C=CC=C1)C(=O)N[C@@]([H])(CC(=O)O)C(=O)N[C@@]([H])(CC(=CN2)C1=C2C=CC=C1)C(=O)N[C@@]([H])([C@]([H])(O)C)C(=O)N[C@@]([H])([C@]([H])(CC)C)C(=O)N
- Except where otherwise noted, data are given for materials in their standard state (at 25 °C [77 °F], 100 kPa). Infobox references

Phlo1a (μ-TRTX-Phlo1a) is a peptide toxin found in the venom of a Phlogius species, an Australian tarantula spiders. Phlo1a makes Na_{v}1.7 channels harder to activate, requiring a stronger electrical stimulus to open them. Na_{v}1.7 channels are implicated in the conduction of pain signals.

== Etymology ==
The name μ-TRTX-Phlo1a is based on the rational nomenclature proposed for spider-venom peptides by Glenn F. King and colleagues. The prefix ‘μ’ indicates that the toxin inhibits voltage-gated sodium (Na_{v}) channels. ‘TRTX’ stands for theraphotoxin, therapho is derived from Theraphosidae, the scientific family name for tarantulas. ‘Phlo’ identifies the spider genus Phlogius. The number 1 indicates a group of related toxins, and the letter ‘a’ distinguishes the first peptide variant form closely related peptides, such as Phlo1b.

== Sources ==
The toxin is derived from the venom of an Australian tarantula of the genus Phlogius. The venom is extracted from the spider by electrical stimulation of the chelicerae.

== Chemistry ==
Phlo1a is a peptide containing 35 residues (linked amino acids) with the following sequence: ACRELLGGCSKDSDCCAHLECRKKWPYHCVWDWTI-NH₂ and a molecular mass of about 4.1 kDa. The sequence contains six cysteines at positions 2, 9, 15, 16, 21, and 29, following the pattern C–C–CC–C–C. The cysteines are linked by three disulfide bridges (S–S). This cysteine pattern is characteristic of an inhibitor cystine knot (ICK). The ICK fold generally makes peptides resistant to heat, extreme pH, and proteases. The sequence ends in -NH_{2}, which means the C-terminus is amidated: the normal acid group (-COOH) on the final amino acid is replaced by an amide group (-CONH_{2}). This modification is rare among spider toxins and it can make the peptide both more stable and more potent.

== Targets ==
Phlo1a works primarily on the voltage-gated sodium channel Na_{v}1.7, which are primarily found in the nociceptors. By amplifying weak, slow stimuli, Na_{v}1.7 determines how much of the signal from the nociceptors is converted into action potentials and perceived as pain. It has also been shown to act on Na_{v}1.2 and Na_{v}1.5 channels, expressed in the central nervous system (CNS) and heart respectively, though with lower potency.

== Mode of action ==
Phlo1a causes a concentration-dependent, depolarizing shift in the current-voltage relationship for Na_{v}1.7. The inhibition by Phlo1a is voltage-dependent, with less inhibition at higher membrane potentials. On this basis, Phlo1a has been proposed to act as a gating modifier that inhibits channel activation by binding to one or more of the voltage-sensor domains, rather than by occluding the channel pore. The binding site on Na_{v}1.7 channels has not been identified.

Phlo1a inhibits Na_{v}1.7 with an IC_{50} = 459 nM, meaning that at a concentration of 459 nM, 50% of the current is inhibited. Chow et al. compared the effects of Phlo1a on Na_{v}1.7 with Na_{v}1.2 and Na_{v}1.5. Because these channels are found in the CNS and the heart, testing these channels helped identify potential off-target effects on neuronal and cardiac function. Both Na_{v}1.2 and Na_{v}1.5 showed less than 20% inhibition at 1 μM of the toxin, showing that Phlo1a is selective for Na_{v}1.7 over Na_{v}1.2 and Na_{v}1.5. According to the authors, this makes Phlo1a a promising starting point for engineering novel analgesics.
