= Guangxitoxin =

Tarantula venom toxin

Guangxitoxin-1E
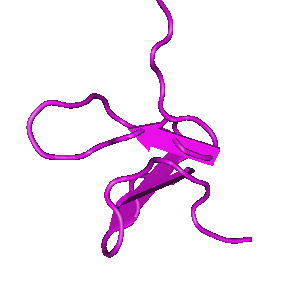
- Schematic diagram of the three-dimensional Solution Structure of GxTX-1E.

Identifiers
- Organism: Chilobrachys guangxiensis
- Symbol: N/A
- UniProt: P84835
Search for
- Structures: Swiss-model
- Domains: InterPro

Guangxitoxin, also known as GxTX, is a peptide toxin found in the venom of the tarantula Chilobrachys guangxiensis. It primarily inhibits outward voltage-gated K_{v}2.1 potassium channel currents, which are prominently expressed in pancreatic β-cells, thus increasing insulin secretion.

== Sources ==
Guangxitoxin is found in the venom of the tarantula Chilobrachys guangxiensis, which lives mainly in Guangxi province of southern China.

== Chemistry ==
=== Subtypes ===
Guangxitoxin consists of multiple subtypes, including GxTX-1D, GxTX-1E and GxTX-2. GxTX-2 shows sequence similarities with Hanatoxin (HaTX), Stromatoxin-1 (ScTx1), and Scodra griseipes toxin (SGTx) peptides. GxTX-1 shows sequence similarities with Jingzhaotoxin-III (JZTX-III), Grammostola spatulata mechanotoxin-4 (GsMTx-4), and Voltage-sensor toxin-1 (VSTX1) peptides. GxTX-1 consists of two variants, GxTX-1D and GxTX-1E, of which GxTX-1E is a more potent inhibitor of K_{v}2.1.

=== Sequence ===
GxTX-1D and GxTX-1E consist of 36 amino acids, differing only a single amino acid at the NH_{2}-terminal, aspartate or glutamate, respectively:

Asp/Glu-Gly-Glu-Cys-Gly-Gly-Phe-Trp-Trp-Lys-Cys-Gly-Ser-Gly-Lys-Pro-Ala-Cys-Cys-Pro-Lys-Tyr-Val-Cys-Ser-Pro-Lys-Trp-Gly-Leu-Cys-Asn-Phe-Pro-Met-Pro

GxTX-2 consists of 33 amino acids, which has only 9 identical amino acids in corresponding sequence compared to GxTX-1D and GxTX-1E:

Glu-Cys-Arg-Lys-Met-Phe-Gly-Gly-Cys-Ser-Val-Asp-Ser-Asp-Cys-Cys-Ala-His-Leu-Gly-Cys-Lys-Pro-Thr-Leu-Lys-Tyr-Cys-Ala-Trp-Asp-Gly-Thr

=== Structure ===
The three-dimensional NMR structure of the toxin reveals an amphipathic part and an inhibitor cystine knot (ICK) motif. The amphipathic part is composed of a large cluster characterized by solvent-exposed hydrophobic residues which is enclosed by acidic and basic residues. The ICK motif contains three disulfide bonds stabilizing the toxin structure. The conserved amphipathic structure assists in binding the toxin and can be explained since similar toxins allocate into lipid membranes effectively with the help of this structure and interact with K_{v} channels from within the membrane. Differences in distribution of acidic and basic residues compared to SGTx-1 may contribute to the difference in affinity of GxTX-1E for the K_{v}2.1 channel. Dissimilarities in orientation of loops and turns compared to JZTX-III may contribute to the discrepancy in selectivity of GxTX-1E to the K_{v}2.1 channel.

== Target ==
GxTX-1E inhibits voltage-gated K_{v}2.1 channels by modifying its voltage-dependent gating,. mutations in the S3b-S4 paddle motif of the voltage-sensing domain of K_{v}2.1 reduce affinity for tarantula toxins. Two other voltage-gated potassium channels inhibited by GxTX-1 are the K_{v}2.2 and K_{v}4.3 channels. K_{v}2.2 is located predominantly in δ-cells of primate islets. K_{v}4.3 is mainly of importance in the heart.

The K_{v}2.1 channel is predominantly expressed in pancreatic β-cells and in the central nervous system. In pancreatic β-cells, K_{v}2.1 comprises 60% of the currents mediated by K_{v} channels. Furthermore, the K_{v}2.1 channel shows similar biophysical properties to the delayed rectifier K^{+} current (I_{DR}) of the β-cells. This makes GxTX appropriate to study the physiological role of the aforementioned current as it inhibits 90% of the β-cell I_{DR}. The I_{DR} is thought to play an important role in repolarization of action potentials. Both the K_{v}2.2 and K_{v}4.3 channels are believed not to contribute significantly to the β-cell I_{DR}.

GxTX-1E has no effect on voltage-gated Na^{+} or Ca^{2+} channels.

== Mode of action ==
Inhibition of K_{v}2.1 by GxTX-1E causes a shift in voltage-dependency of activation toward more positive potentials of almost 100 mV. Moreover, GxTX-1E also exhibits properties of decreasing the velocity of hK_{v}2.1 channel opening and increasing the velocity of K_{v}2.1 channel closing approximately sixfold. By inhibiting K_{v}2.1 potassium channels, GxTX-1E boosts action potentials of pancreatic β-cells causing mainly increased glucose-stimulated intracellular calcium oscillations which in turn intensifies glucose-stimulated insulin secretion. How GxTX-1E can generate distinctive calcium oscillations in different cells remains unclear (broader oscillations, increased frequency or restoration of oscillations), however, the specificity of GxTX-1E points in the direction of I_{DR} inhibition causing these effects. Notably, GxTX-1E stimulated insulin secretion is specifically glucose-dependent, considering that I_{DR} is only active above -20mV membrane potentials which is only seen in raised glucose levels.

== Therapeutic use ==
Unlike K_{ATP} channel blockers, GxTX-1 primarily blocks I_{DR} and demonstrates a potential target for future drugs in diabetes mellitus type 2 treatment, since a blockade of I_{DR} should not provoke hypoglycaemia.
