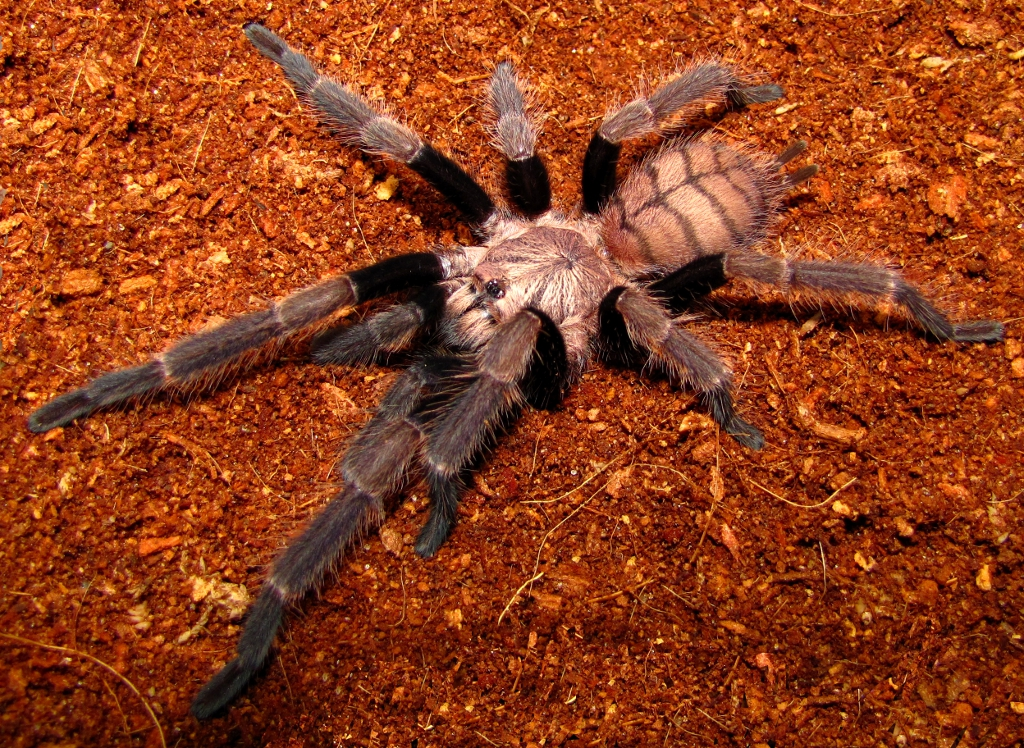
- Adult male Chilobrachys fimbriatus.

Scientific classification
- Kingdom: Animalia
- Phylum: Arthropoda
- Subphylum: Chelicerata
- Class: Arachnida
- Order: Araneae
- Infraorder: Mygalomorphae
- Family: Theraphosidae
- Subfamily: Selenocosmiinae
- Genus: Chilobrachys; Karsch, 1892

Type species
- Chilobrachys nitelinus Karsch, 1892

Species
- 31, see text

= Chilobrachys =

Genus of spiders

Chilobrachys is a genus of Asian tarantulas that was first described by Ferdinand Anton Franz Karsch in 1892. They are found in India, Myanmar, Malaysia, China, Vietnam, Thailand and Sri Lanka. They are usually medium or large-sized, and they can stridulate by using small spines present on the chelicerae.

== Identification features ==
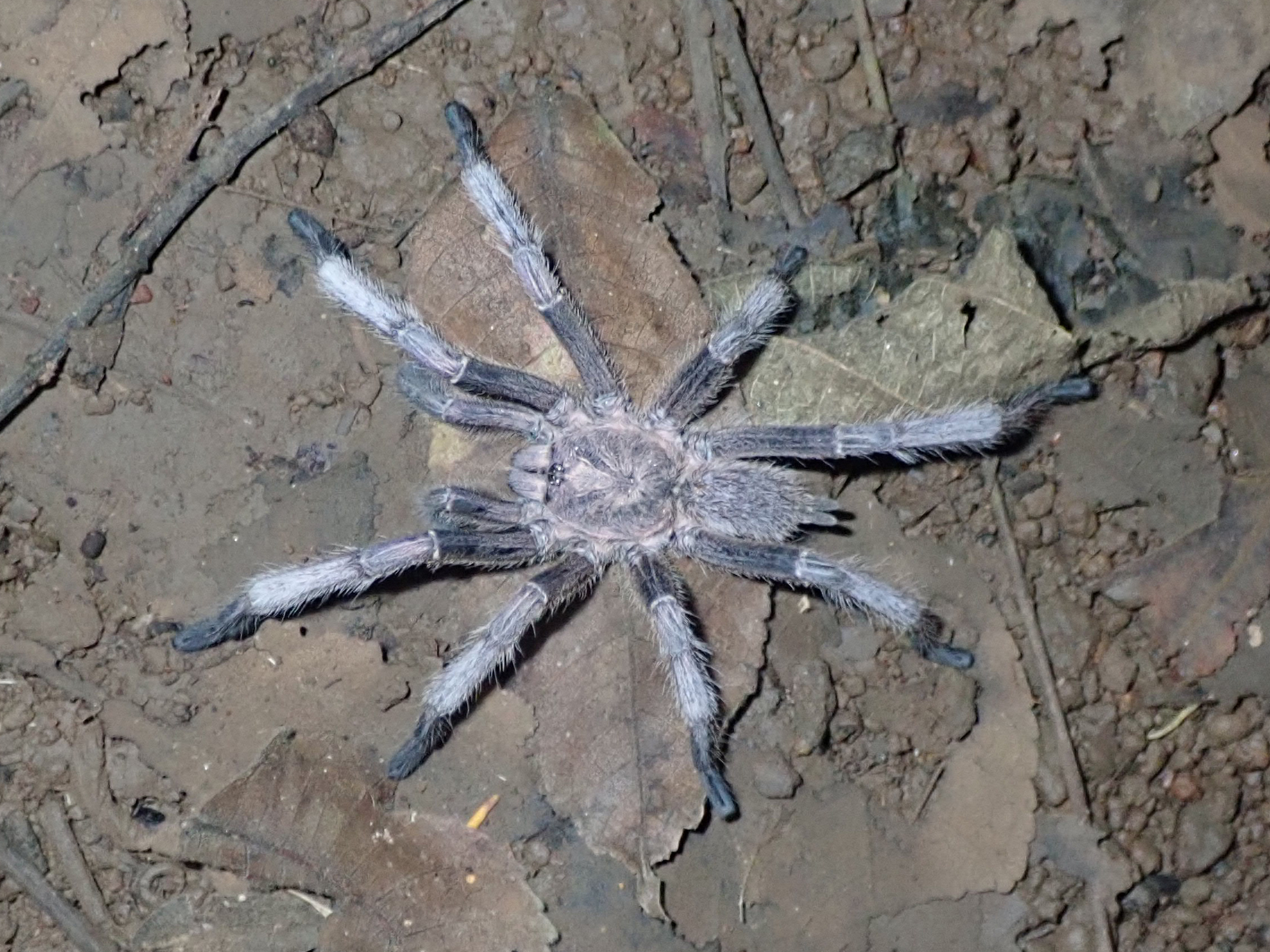
A Chilobrachys dyscolus tarantula.

They have special stridulating organs in their chelicerae, which are made of short spines. Males have a palpal bulb which ends in a long and slender blade like spine, females have one pair of spermatheca. The anterior eyes form almost a straight line. Their legs have a narrower scapulae at the tip of the metatarsus.

== Deaths ==
Some cases have been reported where bites by Chilobrachys hardwickei resulted in gangrene and unconfirmed death.

== Species ==
As of July 2022 it contains thirty-one species, found in Asia:

- Chilobrachys andersoni (Pocock, 1895) – India, Myanmar, Malaysia
- Chilobrachys annandalei Simon, 1901 – Malaysia
- Chilobrachys assamensis Hirst, 1909 – India
- Chilobrachys bicolor (Pocock, 1895) – Myanmar
- Chilobrachys brevipes (Thorell, 1897) – Myanmar
- Chilobrachys dominus Lin & Li, 2022 - China
- Chilobrachys dyscolus (Simon, 1886) – Vietnam
- Chilobrachys femoralis Pocock, 1900 – India
- Chilobrachys fimbriatus Pocock, 1899 – India
- Chilobrachys flavopilosus (Simon, 1884) – India, Myanmar
- Chilobrachys fumosus (Pocock, 1895) – India
- Chilobrachys guangxiensis (Yin & Tan, 2000) – China
- Chilobrachys hardwickei (Pocock, 1895) – India
- Chilobrachys himalayensis (Tikader, 1977) – India
- Chilobrachys huahini Schmidt & Huber, 1996 – Thailand
- Chilobrachys hubei Song & Zhao, 1988 – China
- Chilobrachys jinchengi Lin & Li, 2022 – China
- Chilobrachys jonitriantisvansickleae Nanayakkara, Sumanapala & Kirk, 2019 – Sri Lanka
- Chilobrachys khasiensis (Tikader, 1977) – India
- Chilobrachys liboensis Zhu & Zhang, 2008 – China
- Chilobrachys lubricus Yu, S. Y. Zhang, F. Zhang, Li & Yang, 2021 – China
- Chilobrachys natanicharum Chomphuphuang et al., 2023 – Thailand
- Chilobrachys nitelinus Karsch, 1892 (type) – Sri Lanka
- Chilobrachys oculatus (Thorell, 1895) – Myanmar
- Chilobrachys paviei (Simon, 1886) – Thailand
- Chilobrachys pococki (Thorell, 1897) – Myanmar
- Chilobrachys sericeus (Thorell, 1895) – Myanmar
- Chilobrachys soricinus (Thorell, 1887) – Myanmar
- Chilobrachys stridulans (Wood Mason, 1877) – India
- Chilobrachys subarmatus (Thorell, 1891) – India (Nicobar Islands)
- Chilobrachys thorelli Pocock, 1900 – India
- Chilobrachys tschankhoensis Schenkel, 1963 – China (Nomen dubnium)

In synonymy:

- Chilobrachys decoratus (Tikader, 1977) = Chilobrachys fimbriatus Pocock, 1899
- Chilobrachys jingzhao Zhu, Song & Li, 2001 = Chilobrachys guangxiensis Yin & Tan, 2000

One species has been changed to Selenocosmia:

- Chilobrachys samarae Giltay, 1935 → Selenocosmia samarae
