= Chilobrachys jonitriantisvansickleae =

Scientific classification
- Kingdom: Animalia
- Phylum: Arthropoda
- Subphylum: Chelicerata
- Class: Arachnida
- Order: Araneae
- Infraorder: Mygalomorphae
- Clade: Avicularioidea
- Family: Theraphosidae
- Subfamily: Selenocosmiinae
- Genus: Chilobrachys
- Species: C. jonitriantisvansickleae

Binomial name
- Chilobrachys jonitriantisvansickleae Nanayakkara, Sumanapala & Kirk, 2019

Species of tarantula endemic to Sri Lanka

Chilobrachys jonitriantisvansickleae is a species of tarantula of the genus Chilobrachys. It is endemic to Sri Lanka. The species is named for Joni Triantis Van Sickle, a conservationist involved in protecting the area. It is characterized by iridescent blue markings on its legs.

== Taxonomy ==
The specific name was spelt jonitriantisvansicklei by the original describers. However, this is the correct ending only when the person it is named after is a man; Joni Triantis Van Sickle is a woman. As per Article 32.5.1 of the International Code of Zoological Nomenclature, the World Spider Catalog has corrected the name to have the feminine genitive ending jonitriantisvansickleae.
