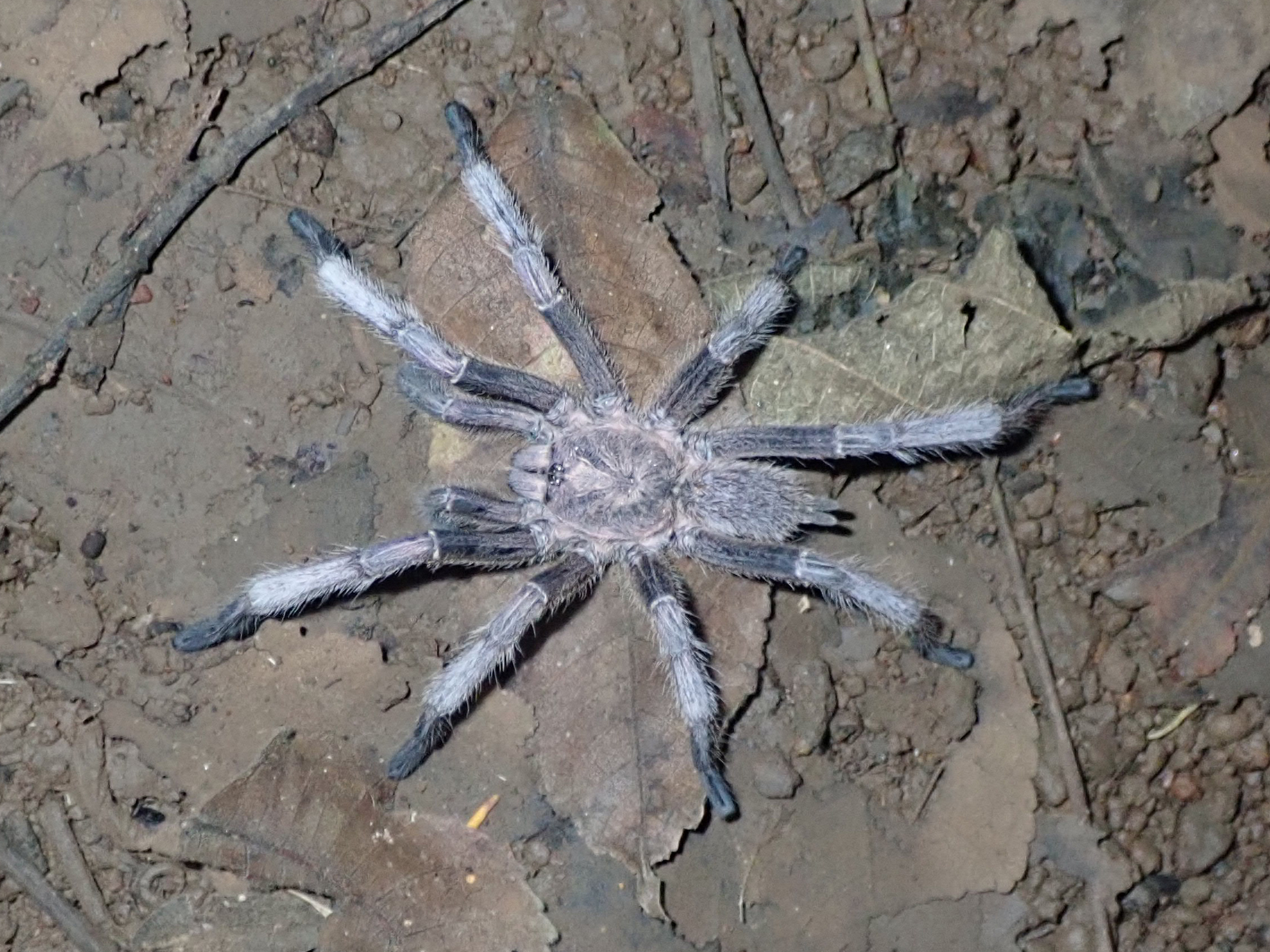
- C. dyscolus in Cat Tien National Park

Scientific classification
- Kingdom: Animalia
- Phylum: Arthropoda
- Subphylum: Chelicerata
- Class: Arachnida
- Order: Araneae
- Infraorder: Mygalomorphae
- Clade: Avicularioidea
- Family: Theraphosidae
- Subfamily: Selenocosmiinae
- Genus: Chilobrachys
- Species: C. dyscolus

Binomial name
- Chilobrachys dyscolus (Simon, 1886)

= Chilobrachys dyscolus =

Species of spider

Chilobrachys dyscolus is a species of spider in the tarantula family (Theraphosidae) native to Vietnam. It was first described by Eugène Simon in 1886 as Phrictus dyscolus. It is known as the Asian smokey earth tiger tarantula, Burma chocolate brown tarantula or Vietnam blue tarantula.

== Description ==
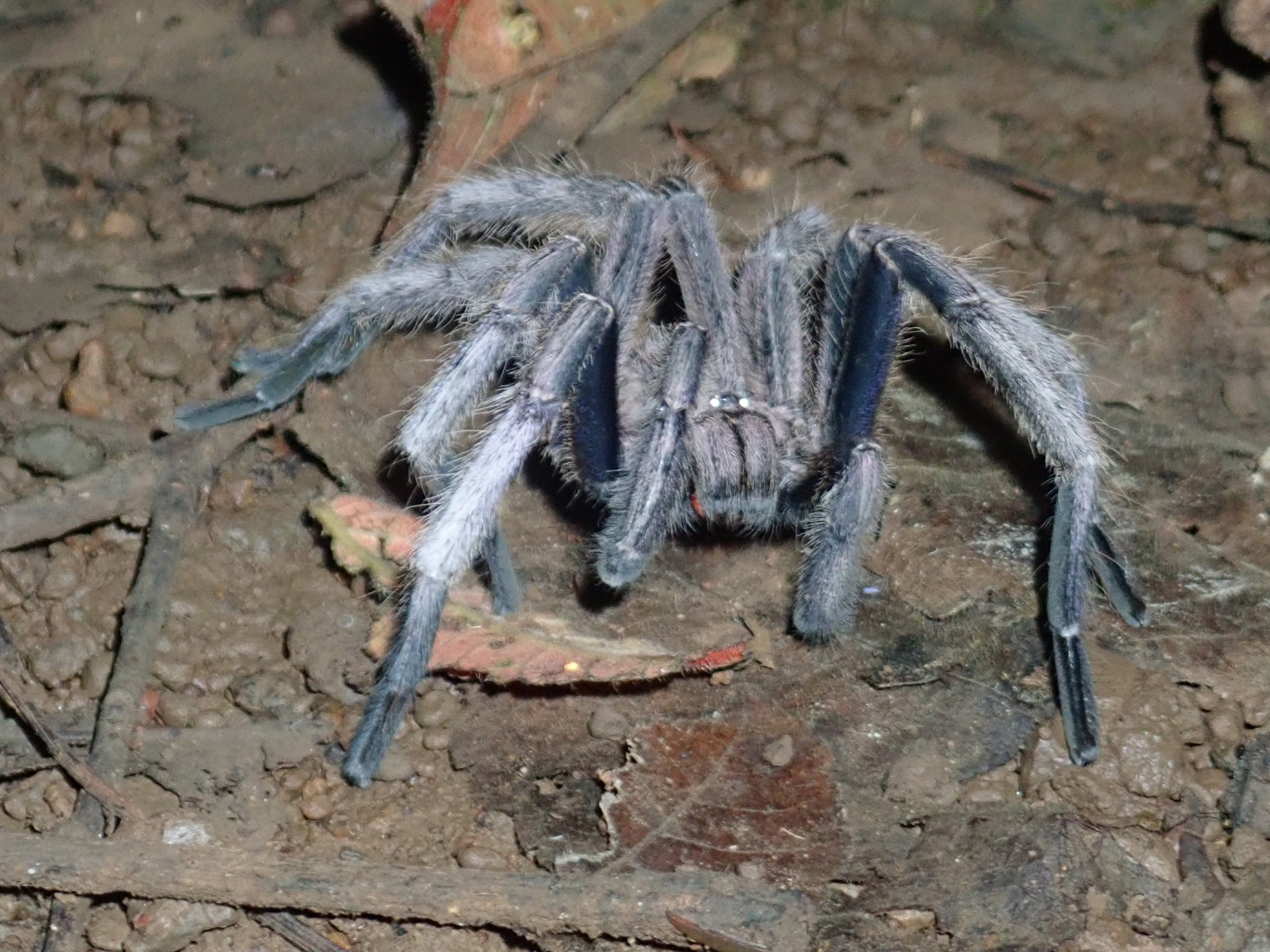
C. dyscolus anterior view

While the species is usually a chocolate brown, grayish spider, after the molt it has a blue-black coloration all throughout the body. Under normal circumstances this tarantula is either a light brown or black all throughout the body. Although sometimes the front facing areas of the pedipalps and legs bright metallic blue color persist.

== Behavior ==
This spider is defensive, and quite nervous, at first it will try to flee, but under persistent provocation it will try to bite. As most of the Chilobrachys genus, it digs intricate and beautiful tunnel systems in the substrate.
