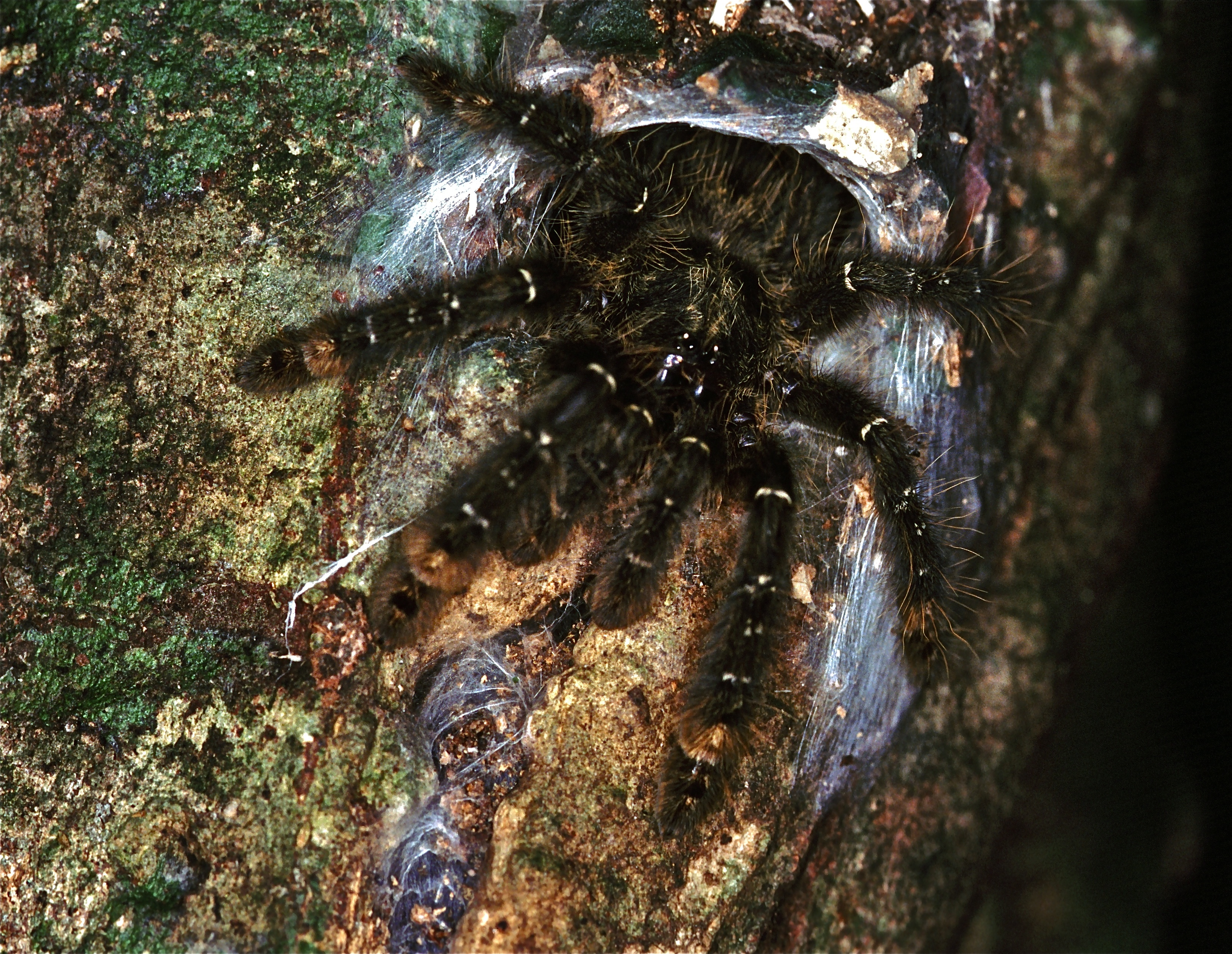

Scientific classification
- Kingdom: Animalia
- Phylum: Arthropoda
- Subphylum: Chelicerata
- Class: Arachnida
- Order: Araneae
- Infraorder: Mygalomorphae
- Family: Theraphosidae
- Genus: Stromatopelma; Karsch, 1881

Type species
- S. calceatum (Fabricius, 1793)

Species
- 5, see text

Synonyms
- Hyarachne Thorell, 1899; Scodra Becker, 1879

= Stromatopelma =

Genus of spiders

Stromatopelma is a genus of African tarantulas that was first described by Ferdinand Anton Franz Karsch in 1881. They are renowned for their potent venom that uses stromatoxin peptides to induce medically significant effects.

== Species ==
As of May 2020 it contains five species and one subspecies, found in Africa:

- Stromatopelma batesi (Pocock, 1902) – Cameroon, Congo
- Stromatopelma calceatum (Fabricius, 1793) (type) – West Africa
  - Stromatopelma c. griseipes (Pocock, 1897) – West Africa
- Stromatopelma fumigatum (Pocock, 1900) – Equatorial Guinea (Mbini)
- Stromatopelma pachypoda (Strand, 1908) – Cameroon
- Stromatopelma satanas (Berland, 1917) – Gabon, Congo

In synonymy:

- Stromatopelma alicapillatum Karsch, 1881 = Stromatopelma calceatum
- Stromatopelma aussereri (Becker, 1879) = Stromatopelma calceatum
- Stromatopelma brachypoda (Pocock, 1897) = Stromatopelma calceatum
- Stromatopelma horrida (Thorell, 1899) = Stromatopelma calceatum
- Stromatopelma straeleni (Roewer, 1953) = Stromatopelma batesi
