= Chilobrachys andersoni =

Scientific classification
- Kingdom: Animalia
- Phylum: Arthropoda
- Subphylum: Chelicerata
- Class: Arachnida
- Order: Araneae
- Infraorder: Mygalomorphae
- Clade: Avicularioidea
- Family: Theraphosidae
- Subfamily: Selenocosmiinae
- Genus: Chilobrachys
- Species: C. andersoni

Binomial name
- Chilobrachys andersoni (Pocock, 1895)

Species of spider

Chilobrachys andersoni, commonly known as the Burmese mustard tarantula, or Burmese Brown, is a species of spider of the genus Chilobrachys. It is found in India, Myanmar, Philippines, Thailand and Malaysia.
