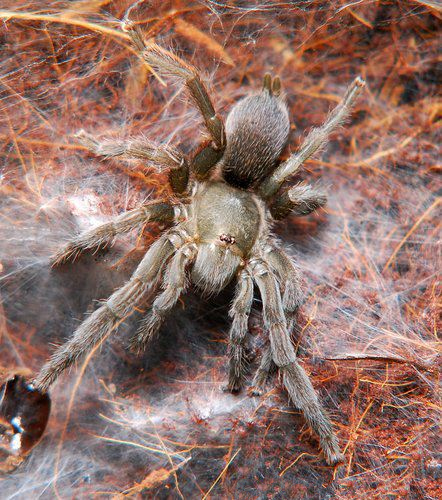
- Phlogiellus baeri

Scientific classification
- Kingdom: Animalia
- Phylum: Arthropoda
- Subphylum: Chelicerata
- Class: Arachnida
- Order: Araneae
- Infraorder: Mygalomorphae
- Family: Theraphosidae
- Subfamily: Selenocosmiinae
- Genus: Phlogiellus; Pocock, 1897

Type species
- P. atriceps Pocock, 1897

Species
- 26, see text

Synonyms
- Baccallbrapo Barrion & Litsinger, 1995; Yamia Kishida, 1920

= Phlogiellus =

Genus of spiders

Phlogiellus is a genus of tarantulas that was first described by Reginald Innes Pocock in 1897. They are found throughout Asia and Papua New Guinea, including Indonesia, the Philippines, Papua New Guinea, China, Myanmar, Malaysia, Borneo, Thailand, the Solomon Islands and Taiwan. Phlogiellus is part Latin and part Greek, the first part being "φλóξ φλoγóϛ", meaning flame, the second part being "ellus" which is a latin diminutive suffix.

== Diagnosis ==
The can be distinguished thanks to the scopulae on tarsi 1 and 4, which were divided. There is also a stridulating organ present but reduced. They also own thin and elongated chelicerate strikers, which are pallid in color. Their size is also smaller than most other tarantulas.

== Species ==
As of July 2022 it contains twenty-six species and one subspecies, found in Asia, on the Solomon Islands, and in Papua New Guinea:

- Phlogiellus aper (Simon, 1891) – Indonesia (Java)
- Phlogiellus atriceps Pocock, 1897 (type) – Indonesia (Java)
- Phlogiellus baeri (Simon, 1877) – Philippines
- Phlogiellus bicolor Strand, 1911 – Papua New Guinea (New Britain)
- Phlogiellus bogadeki Nunn, West & von Wirth, 2016 – China (Hong Kong)
- Phlogiellus brevipes (Thorell, 1897) – Myanmar
- Phlogiellus bundokalbo (Barrion & Litsinger, 1995) – Philippines
- Phlogiellus daweiensis Sivayyapram & Warrit, 2020 - Myanmar
- Phlogiellus inermis (Ausserer, 1871) – Malaysia to Indonesia (Lombok)
- Phlogiellus insulanus (Hirst, 1909) – Indonesia (Sulawesi)
  - Phlogiellus i. borneoensis (Schmidt, 2015) – Borneo
- Phlogiellus insularis (Simon, 1877) – Philippines
- Phlogiellus jiaxiangi Lin & Li, 2021 - China
- Phlogiellus johnreylazoi Nunn, West & von Wirth, 2016 – Philippines (Palawan Is.)
- Phlogiellus longipalpus Chomphuphuang, Smith, Wongvilas, Sivayyapram, Songsangchote & Warrit, 2017 – Thailand
- Phlogiellus moniqueverdezae Nunn, West & von Wirth, 2016 – Thailand
- Phlogiellus mutus (Giltay, 1935) – Philippines
- Phlogiellus nebulosus (Rainbow, 1899) – Solomon Is.
- Phlogiellus obscurus (Hirst, 1909) – Malaysia (Borneo)
- Phlogiellus ornatus (Thorell, 1897) – Myanmar
- Phlogiellus orophilus (Thorell, 1897) – Myanmar
- Phlogiellus pelidnus Nunn, West & von Wirth, 2016 – Malaysia (Borneo)
- Phlogiellus quanyui Lin, Li & Chen, 2021 - China (Hainan)
- Phlogiellus raveni Sivayyapram & Warrit, 2020 - Philippines (Cebu)
- Phlogiellus subinermis (Giltay, 1934) – Southeast Asia
- Phlogiellus watasei (Kishida, 1920) – Taiwan
- Phlogiellus xinping (Zhu & Zhang, 2008) – Hong Kong

Formerly included:

- Phlogiellus kwebaburdeos Barrion-Dupo, Barrion & Rasalan, 2015 → Orphnaecus kwebaburdeos
- Phlogiellus lucubrans (L. Koch, 1874) → Selenocosmia crassipes
- Phlogiellus subarmatus (Thorell, 1891) → Chilobrachys subarmatus

== See also ==
- Phlotoxin 1
