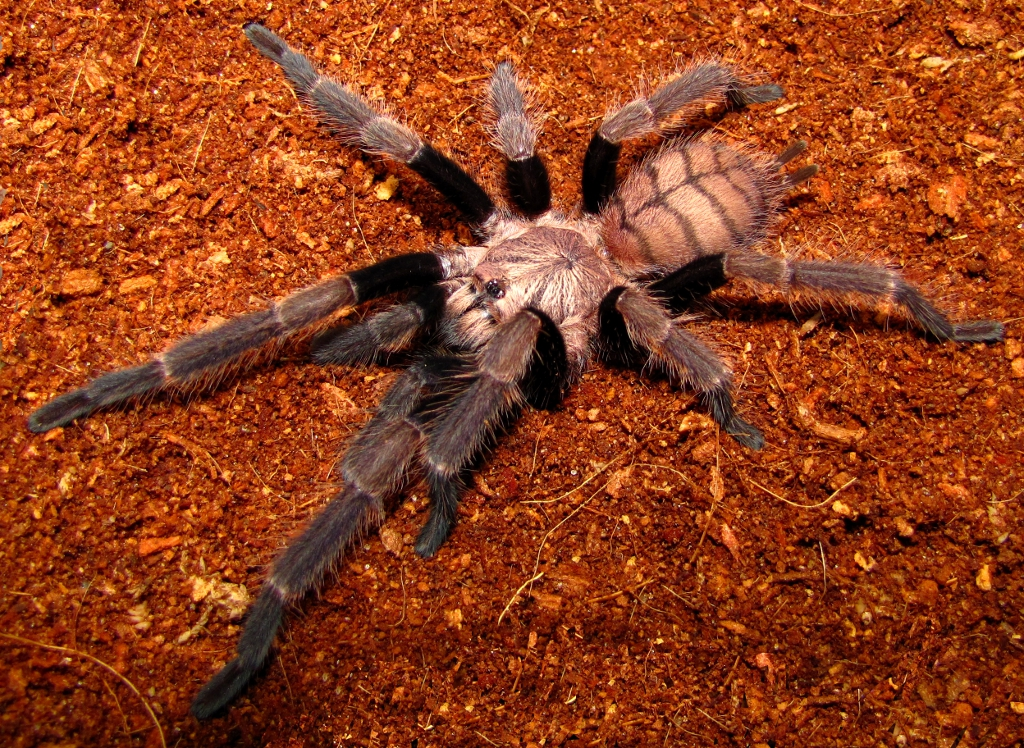

Conservation status
- Least Concern (IUCN 3.1)

Scientific classification
- Kingdom: Animalia
- Phylum: Arthropoda
- Subphylum: Chelicerata
- Class: Arachnida
- Order: Araneae
- Infraorder: Mygalomorphae
- Clade: Avicularioidea
- Family: Theraphosidae
- Subfamily: Selenocosmiinae
- Genus: Chilobrachys
- Species: C. fimbriatus

Binomial name
- Chilobrachys fimbriatus Pocock, 1899

= Chilobrachys fimbriatus =

Species of spider endemic to India

Chilobrachys fimbriatus, commonly known as the Indian Violet Earth Tiger Tarantula usually shortened to Indian Violet Tarantula, is a species of spider of the genus Chilobrachys. It is endemic to India, and was first described by Reginald Innes Pocock in 1899.

== Description ==
Females live 12 to 15 years, while males only live to 5. The carapace is a light brown or golden color, the opisthosoma is a reddish brown color with black chevrons. The legs are a blueish greyish color, with a deep black femur.

== Habitat ==
They live in the tropical regions of western India, near the coast. The average temperature is 27°C, with average yearly precipitation of 2900mm. There are plants such as the coconut palm, Banyan and Sacred fig, with animals such as kingfishers, mouse deers, and Indian Giant Squirrel.

== Behavior ==
They are burrowing tarantulas, which like most will try to flee at first, if consistently provoked it will probably bite, with their probably painful venom and bite. They make incredible tunnels and webs under the surface, where they will stay at day, whereas at night they might be seen outside.
