= Stromatopelma fumigatum =

Scientific classification
- Kingdom: Animalia
- Phylum: Arthropoda
- Subphylum: Chelicerata
- Class: Arachnida
- Order: Araneae
- Infraorder: Mygalomorphae
- Family: Theraphosidae
- Genus: Stromatopelma
- Species: S. fumigatum

Binomial name
- Stromatopelma fumigatum (Pocock, 1899)

Synonyms
- Scodra fumigata Pocock, 1899

Species of spider

Stromatopelma fumigatum is a species of spider in the tarantula family, Theraphosidae, endemic to Río Muni.

== Diagnosis ==
Stromatopelma fumigatum is characterized by the labio-sternal mound (i.e. small "bumps") arrangement: six mounds on the edge of the sternum, the anterior one being largest, and the median being the smallest. Even though the anterior mound is still the largest, it is smaller than in other species.

== Behavior ==
Stromatopelma fumigatum, like all stromatopelmine gerena, are famously aggressive, therefore are rarely kept as pets. They are arboreal, living in palm trees mainly, which provide shade from the sun in the flat plains of west Africa, and are highly territorial, showing a high amount of cannibalism.
