= PTPRE =

Protein-coding gene in the species Homo sapiens

Identifiers
- Aliases: PTPRE, HPTPE, PTPE, R-PTP-EPSILON, protein tyrosine phosphatase, receptor type E, protein tyrosine phosphatase receptor type E
- External IDs: OMIM: 600926; MGI: 97813; GeneCards: PTPRE
Available structures
PDB	Ortholog search: PDBe RCSB
PDB	List of PDB id codes 2JJD
Enzyme activity
EC #	BRENDA	ExPASy	KEGG	MetaCyc
3.1.3.48	↗	↗	↗	↗

Gene location (Human)
Chr.	Chromosome 10 (human)
Band	10q26.2	Start	127,907,103 bp
Band	10q26.2	End	128,085,855 bp

Gene location (Mouse)
Chr.	Chromosome 7 (mouse)
Band	7 F3|7 81.27 cM	Start	135,139,210 bp
Band	7 F3|7 81.27 cM	End	135,288,022 bp
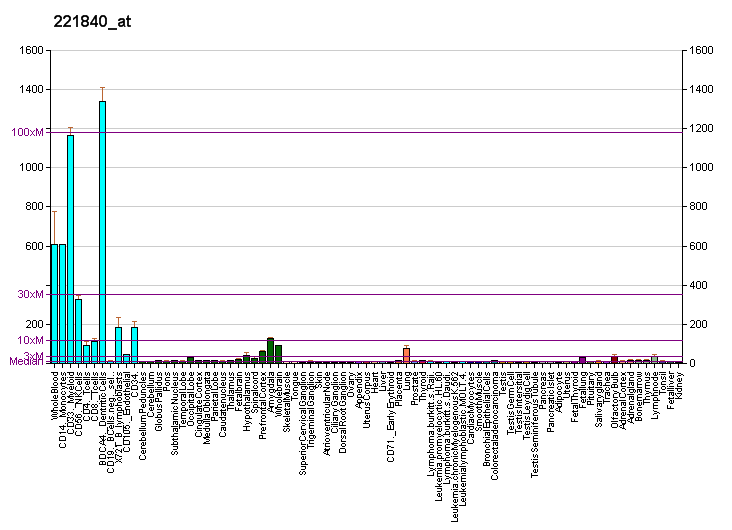
RNA expression pattern
Bgee	Human / Mouse (ortholog); Top expressed in: monocyte; blood; bone marrow cell; granulocyte; sural nerve; visceral pleura; trigeminal ganglion; right lung; appendix; upper lobe of left lung / Top expressed in: granulocyte; sciatic nerve; tibiofemoral joint; primary oocyte; CA3 field; subiculum; olfactory tubercle; bone marrow; right lung lobe; stroma of bone marrow; More reference expression data
BioGPS	More reference expression data
Gene ontology
Molecular function	protein tyrosine phosphatase activity; phosphatase activity; transmembrane receptor protein tyrosine phosphatase activity; protein binding; phosphoprotein phosphatase activity; hydrolase activity
Cellular component	cytoplasm; integral component of membrane; plasma membrane; membrane; nucleus
Biological process	negative regulation of insulin receptor signaling pathway; protein dephosphorylation; peptidyl-tyrosine dephosphorylation; dephosphorylation
Sources:Amigo / QuickGO
Orthologs
Databases	NCBI: entry; OMA: entry
Species	Human	Mouse
Entrez	5791	19267
Ensembl	ENSG00000132334	ENSMUSG00000041836
UniProt	P23469	P49446
RefSeq (mRNA)	NM_006504; NM_130435; NM_001316676; NM_001316677; NM_001323354 NM_001323355; NM_001323356; NM_001323357	NM_011212; NM_001316678; NM_001316679; NM_001316680; NM_001316681
RefSeq (protein)	NP_001303605; NP_001303606; NP_001310283; NP_001310284; NP_001310285 NP_001310286; NP_006495; NP_569119	NP_001303607; NP_001303608; NP_001303609; NP_001303610; NP_035342
Location (UCSC)	Chr 10: 127.91 – 128.09 Mb	Chr 7: 135.14 – 135.29 Mb
PubMed search
- Wikidata
View/Edit Human	View/Edit Mouse

Receptor-type tyrosine-protein phosphatase epsilon is an enzyme that in humans is encoded by the PTPRE gene.

== Function ==
The protein encoded by this gene is a member of the protein tyrosine phosphatase (PTP) family. PTPs are known to be signaling molecules that regulate a variety of cellular processes including cell growth, differentiation, mitotic cycle, and oncogenic transformation. Two alternatively spliced transcript variants of this gene have been reported, one of which encodes a receptor-type PTP that possesses a short extracellular domain, a single transmembrane region, and two tandem intracytoplasmic catalytic domains; Another one encodes a PTP that contains a distinct hydrophilic N-terminus, and thus represents a nonreceptor-type isoform of this PTP. Studies of the similar gene in mice suggested the regulatory roles of this PTP in RAS related signal transduction pathways, cytokines induced SATA signaling, as well as the activation of voltage-gated K+ channels.

== Interactions ==
PTPRE has been shown to interact with KCNB1.
