= Selenocosmia strenua =

Scientific classification
- Kingdom: Animalia
- Phylum: Arthropoda
- Subphylum: Chelicerata
- Class: Arachnida
- Order: Araneae
- Infraorder: Mygalomorphae
- Family: Theraphosidae
- Genus: Selenocosmia
- Species: S. strenua

Binomial name
- Selenocosmia strenua (Thorell, 1881)

Synonyms
- Phrictus strenuus Thorell, 1881

Species of spider

Selenocosmia strenua is a species of mygalomorph spider in the Theraphosidae family. It is found in Australia and New Guinea, and was described in 1881 by Swedish arachnologist Tamerlan Thorell.

== Distribution and habitat ==
The type locality is Somerset, at the northern tip of the Cape York Peninsula in Far North Queensland.

== Behaviour ==
The spiders are terrestrial predators.
