= Phlotoxin 1 =

Neurotoxin from the venom of a tarantula

Mu-theraphotoxin-Pspp1

Identifiers
- Organism: Phlogiellus sp. (Tarantula)
- Symbol: PhlTx1
- Orthologs: OMA: entry
- UniProt: P0DM14
Search for
- Structures: Swiss-model
- Domains: InterPro

Phlotoxin (PhlTx1, μ-TRTX-Pspp-1) is a neurotoxin from the venom of the tarantula Phlogiellus that targets mostly voltage-sensitive sodium channels and mainly Nav1.7. The only non-sodium voltage-sensitive channel that is inhibited by Phlotoxin is Kv3.4. Nav1.4 and Nav1.6 seem to be Phlotoxin-1-sensitive to some extent as well.

Phlotoxin (μ-TRTX-Pspp-1)
Category	Ion channel toxin, Neurotoxin
Genus	Phlogiellus
Target	voltage-gated sodium channel (mainly)
Spider toxin family	NaSpTx-1
Sequence length	34 amino acids with 3 disulfide bridges
Mass	4058.83 Da

== Etymology ==
Another name for phlotoxin is μ-TRTX-Pspp-1: μ for NaV channel inhibition, then TRTX refers to theraphotoxin which refers to a group of toxins found in the Theraphosidae family.

== Sources ==
Phlotoxin was first purified, characterized and sequenced from Phlogiellus sp. Phlogiellus is a genus of tarantulas. Its venom, which includes several neurotoxic peptides like phlotoxin, targets diverse ion channels and chemical receptors.

== Chemistry ==
=== Structure ===
Phlotoxin-1 (PhlTx1), weighing around 4058.83 Da, is identified by a 34-amino acid sequence featuring three disulfide bridges and organized based on the Inhibitor Cystine Knot (ICK) architectural motif which is effective for its structural stabilization as three disulfide bonds are structured in a manner where two of them combine to create a circular arrangement, through which the third disulfide bond passes. It is classified to be a member of the NaV channel spider toxin (NaSpTx) family 1.

Symbol	Other names	Amino Acid Sequence
PhlTx1	Mu-theraphotoxin-Pspp1	-ACLGQWDSCDPKASKCCP—NYACEWKYP—WCRYKLF-

The structure of phlotoxin comprises six cysteine residues forming an ICK architecture fold, with amidation occurring at the C-terminus. "Cys^{2}-Cys^{17}, Cys^{9}-Cys^{22}, Cys^{16}-Cys^{29}" disulfide bridge organization. The proximity of Cys 16 and 17 makes it challenging to synthesize even though phlotoxin is commercially available.

=== Homology ===
The sequence similarity of PhlTx1 with other peptides does not exceed 59%. The closest match regarding inhibition IC_{50} for PhlTx1 is found in the NaSpTx family to HnTx-III or HwTx-I. It is basically classified under the NaSpTx family, due to the presence of disulfide bridges. PhlTx1 is categorized within the NaSpTx-1 family primarily because of its disulfide bridges. Notably, the inclusion of three proline residues (Pro11, Pro18, and Pro27) introduces the potential for Cis–trans isomerism. This dynamic property can influence the precise formation of secondary structures and the correct alignment of disulfide bridges, thereby impacting the overall structural integrity of the toxin.

== Target ==
The predicted structure of Phlotoxin-1 UniProt: P0DM14

In examining the effects of PhlTx1 on the sodium channel Nav1.7/β1, it appears to share similarities with TTX (tetrodotoxin). Both PhlTx1 and TTX exhibit a capacity to block the channel pore, resulting in a noticeable decrease in sodium currents. Moreover, the behavior of the channel, as reflected in gating parameters, remains largely unaffected by the presence of PhlTx1. This observation suggests a comparable behavior between PhlTx1 and TTX in modulating the function of Nav1.7/β1 channels. The IC_{50} for PhlTx1 to inhibit Nav1.7 is 39 +/- 2 nM.

The PhlTx1 affects all hNav (human voltage-gated Na channels) channels to a different degree except hNav1.8. There is a poor selectivity of PhlTx1 towards the hNav1.1 and 1.3. It also has shown a high affinity towards hNav1.7.

== Mode of action ==
The amino acids which are critical for binding of the hNaV1.7 subtype are identified by their substitution with alanine. When tryptophan at position 24, lysine at position 25 and tyrosine at position 26 are replaced with alanine, there is a complete loss of affinity. This highlights the critical role of these amino acids in the binding process to Nav1.7. Other substitutions, like alanine at position 1, serine at position 8, lysine at position 12 or 15, result in a slight change (less than 2.8-fold) in variant affinity, whereas substituting aspartate at position 7 leads to an increase in variant affinity (IC_{50} = 47.0 ± 40.9).

== Therapeutic use ==
Phlotoxin-1 (PhlTx1) has demonstrated selectivity in inhibiting the voltage-gated sodium channel NaV1.7. Its potential as an antinociceptive agent became apparent when a loss-of-function mutation in the NaV1.7 gene resulted in a congenital inability to perceive pain. Notably, these peptides do not independently exhibit antinociceptive effects; however, when co-administered with exogenous opioids, they bring about analgesic effect, allowing for a significant reduction in opioid dosage. The mechanism underlying the synergistic effect of opioid receptor agonists with selective NaV1.7 inhibitors remains unknown, but this discovery presents a novel approach to pain management. The primary method for evaluating this property involves the formalin test. However, the poor selectivity towards the hNav1.5 and 1.6 subtypes may be associated with in vivo cardiac and neuromuscular side effects, respectively, which could limit its potential use as an analgesic molecule.
