= Chilobrachys nitelinus =

Scientific classification
- Kingdom: Animalia
- Phylum: Arthropoda
- Subphylum: Chelicerata
- Class: Arachnida
- Order: Araneae
- Infraorder: Mygalomorphae
- Family: Theraphosidae
- Genus: Chilobrachys
- Species: C. nitelinus

Binomial name
- Chilobrachys nitelinus Karsch, 1892

Species of spider

Chilobrachys nitelinus, is a species of spider of the genus Chilobrachys. It is endemic to Sri Lanka.
