= Phlogiellus inermis =

Scientific classification
- Kingdom: Animalia
- Phylum: Arthropoda
- Subphylum: Chelicerata
- Class: Arachnida
- Order: Araneae
- Infraorder: Mygalomorphae
- Family: Theraphosidae
- Genus: Phlogiellus
- Species: P. inermis

Binomial name
- Phlogiellus inermis (Ausserer, 1871)

Species of spider

Phlogiellus inermis is a small species of tarantula, commonly known as the Singapore tarantula. It is found in areas from Malaysia to Indonesia. These small, common tarantulas are nocturnal, living in leaf litter especially at the base of tree trunks, and even in homes. The females are about 20 mm in size, and males are smaller at about 17 mm in size.
