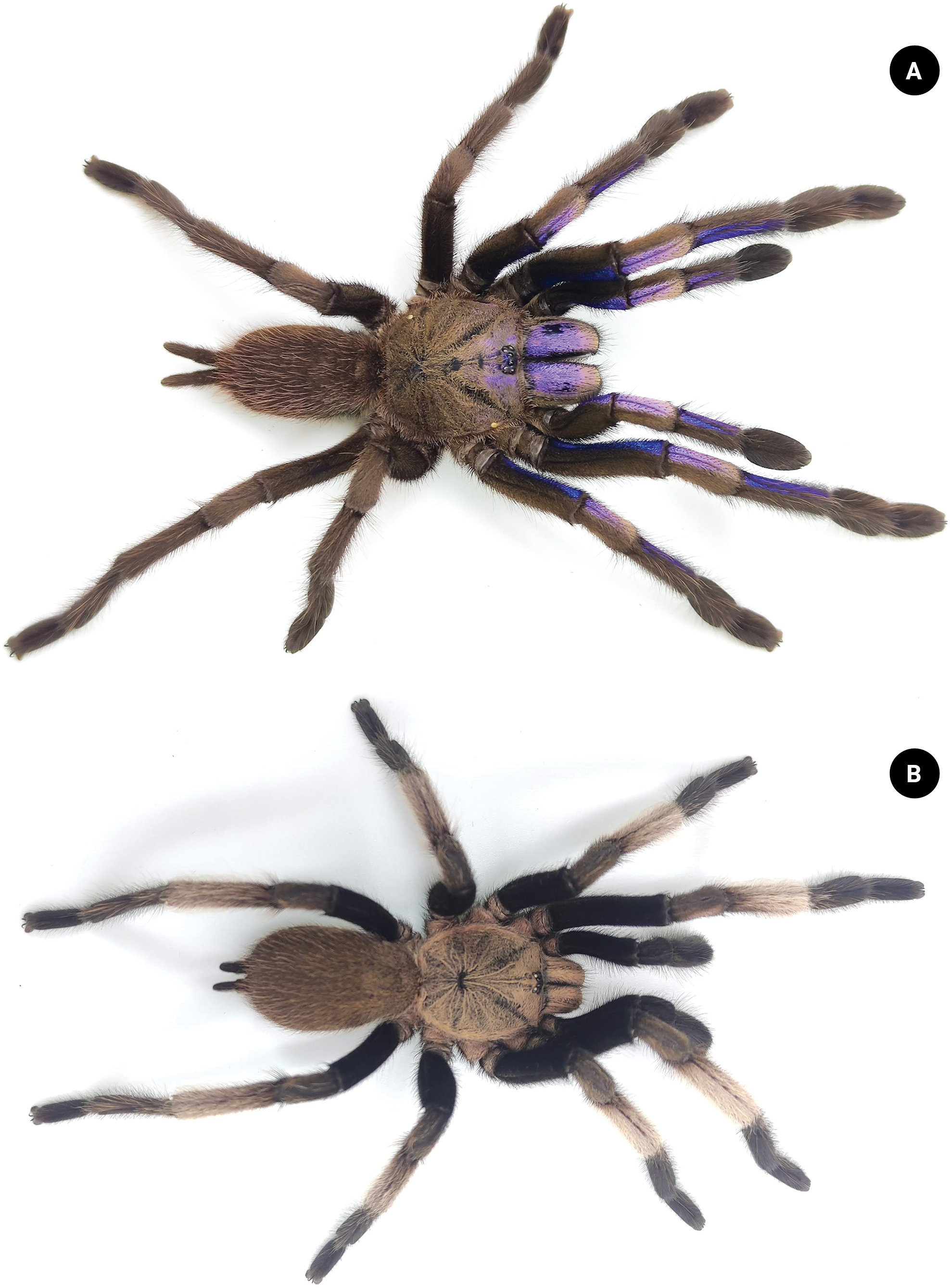
- Female (upper image) Male (lower image)

Scientific classification
- Kingdom: Animalia
- Phylum: Arthropoda
- Subphylum: Chelicerata
- Class: Arachnida
- Order: Araneae
- Infraorder: Mygalomorphae
- Family: Theraphosidae
- Genus: Chilobrachys
- Species: C. natanicharum

Binomial name
- Chilobrachys natanicharum Chomphuphuang, Sippawat, Sriranan, Piyatrakulchai & Songsangchote, 2023

= Chilobrachys natanicharum =

Species of tarantula

Chilobrachys natanicharum is a species of tarantulas in the genus Chilobrachys that is native to the country of Thailand, found specifically in mangroves forest regions.

== Background ==
Also known as the electric blue tarantula in the tarantula trade market, species is most known and gets its name from its electric blue legs and black body coloration. However C. natanicharum blue coloration can come into two different forms which are metallic blue and violet coloration. Its blue coloration is unique as blue colors are rare in nature. This unique structural blue color has evolved independently at least 8 times. Adding to its uniqueness is that its the only species of tarantula that lives in the mangrove forests of Thailand. This species is listed by Thailand as controlled wildlife due to the loss and destruction of its habitat in the Announcement of the Ministry of Natural Resources and Environment

== Habitat ==
The uniqueness of this tarantula is that it lives in the mangrove forests of Thailand, the only one of its kind. The geographical elevation that they are found in can range from sea level to highland areas and live in both arboreal and terrestrial burrows in evergreen forests. They can be found at elevations of up to 57 m.
