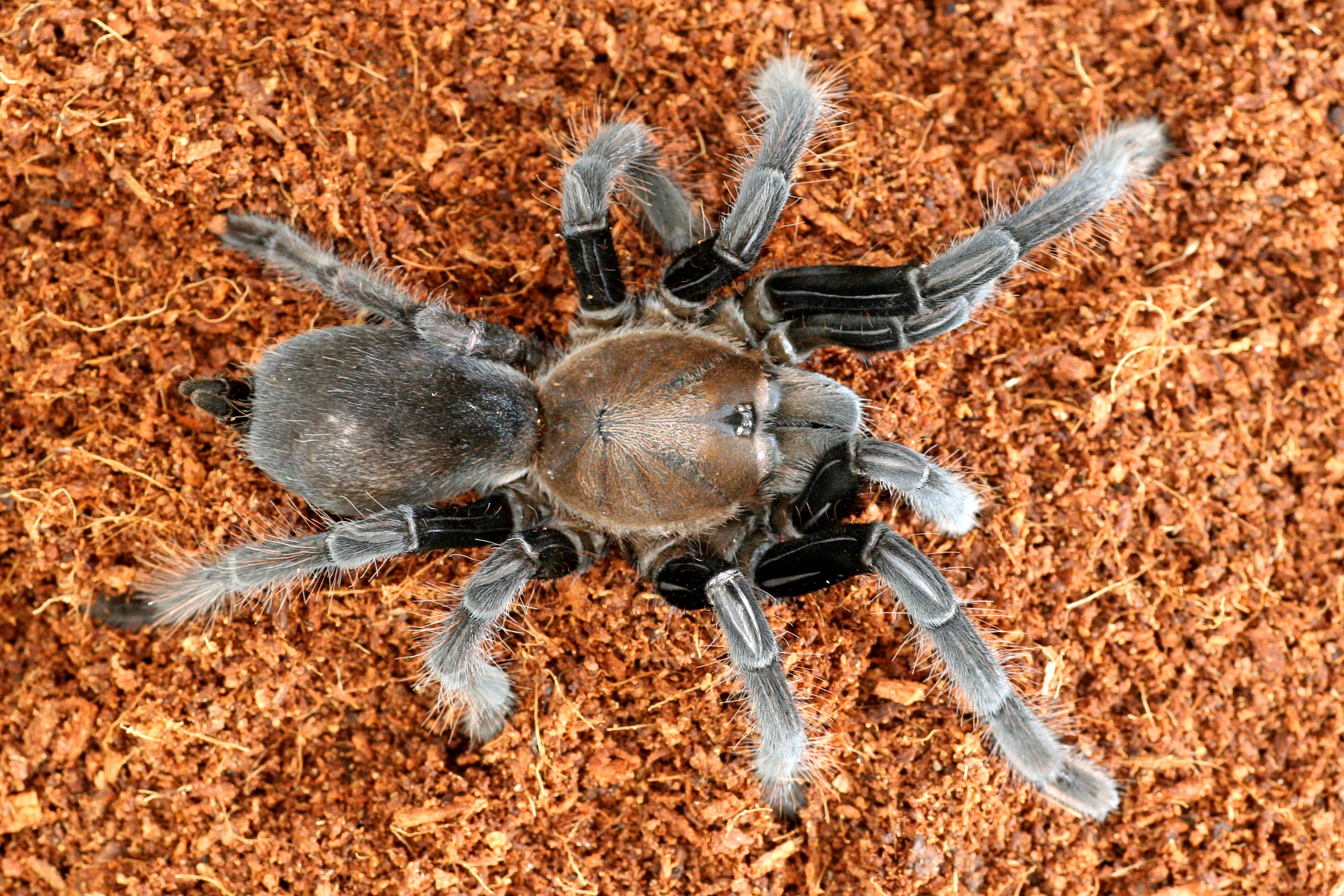

Scientific classification
- Kingdom: Animalia
- Phylum: Arthropoda
- Subphylum: Chelicerata
- Class: Arachnida
- Order: Araneae
- Infraorder: Mygalomorphae
- Family: Theraphosidae
- Genus: Selenocosmia
- Species: S. barensteinerae

Binomial name
- Selenocosmia barensteinerae (Schmidt, Hettegger & Matthes, 2010)

Synonyms
- Chilocosmia barensteinerae Schmidt, Hettegger & Matthes, 2010

= Selenocosmia barensteinerae =

Species of tarantula

Selenocosmia barensteinerae is a species of tarantula within the family Theraphosidae. The species is found in Southeast Asia on the island Borneo.
