= Psednocnemis =

Scientific classification
- Kingdom: Animalia
- Phylum: Arthropoda
- Subphylum: Chelicerata
- Class: Arachnida
- Order: Araneae
- Infraorder: Mygalomorphae
- Family: Theraphosidae
- Subfamily: Selenocosmiinae
- Genus: Psednocnemis; West, Nunn & Hogg, 2012

Type species
- P. davidgohi West, Nunn & Hogg, 2012

Species
- 5, see text

Genus of spiders

Psednocnemis is a genus of Southeast Asian tarantulas that was first described by R. C. West, S. C. Nunn & Henry Roughton Hogg in 2012.

== Species ==
As of May 2020 it contains five species, found in Indonesia and Malaysia:

- Psednocnemis brachyramosa (West & Nunn, 2010) – Malaysia
- Psednocnemis davidgohi West, Nunn & Hogg, 2012 (type) – Malaysia
- Psednocnemis gnathospina (West & Nunn, 2010) – Malaysia
- Psednocnemis imbellis (Simon, 1891) – Borneo
- Psednocnemis jeremyhuffi (West & Nunn, 2010) – Malaysia
