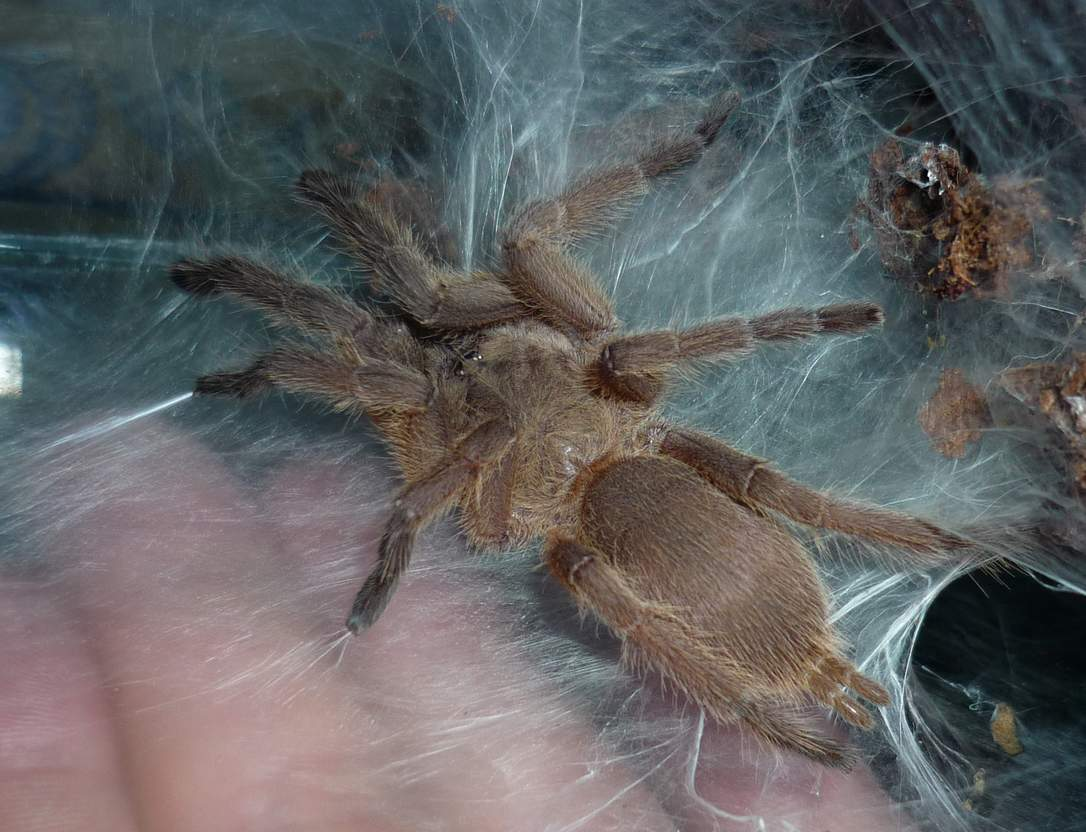

Scientific classification
- Kingdom: Animalia
- Phylum: Arthropoda
- Subphylum: Chelicerata
- Class: Arachnida
- Order: Araneae
- Infraorder: Mygalomorphae
- Family: Theraphosidae
- Genus: Chilobrachys
- Species: C. huahini

Binomial name
- Chilobrachys huahini Schmidt & Huber, 1996

= Chilobrachys huahini =

Species of tarantula spider

Chilobrachys huahini also known as the Asian fawn, Hauhini bird spider or Hauhini birdeater tarantula is a tarantula which was first described in 1996 by Gunter Schmidt and Siegfried Huber. It is named after Hua Hin, Thailand, where it is found.

== Description ==
Females live 11 to 12 years, while males live 2 to 4. Their bodies are all around brown, with some darker stripping in the carapace and legs. Males are a bit lighter than the females, though their coloration is still brown.

== Habitat ==
It is found in Hua Hin, which is home to a tropical savanna climate. With average temperatures of 28°C/82.4°F, and average yearly rainfall of 955mm. It is home to plants such as Dipterocarpus tuberculatus and Hopea odorata. It is also home to animals such as Gaurs, Asian elephants and Golden Jackals.

== Behavior ==
It is a terrestrial tarantula, but is also an opportunistic burrower. They are very defensive, and are quite skittish; they are quite fast, and persistent provocation may result in a bite. As they are old world tarantulas, they do possess potentially significant venom.
