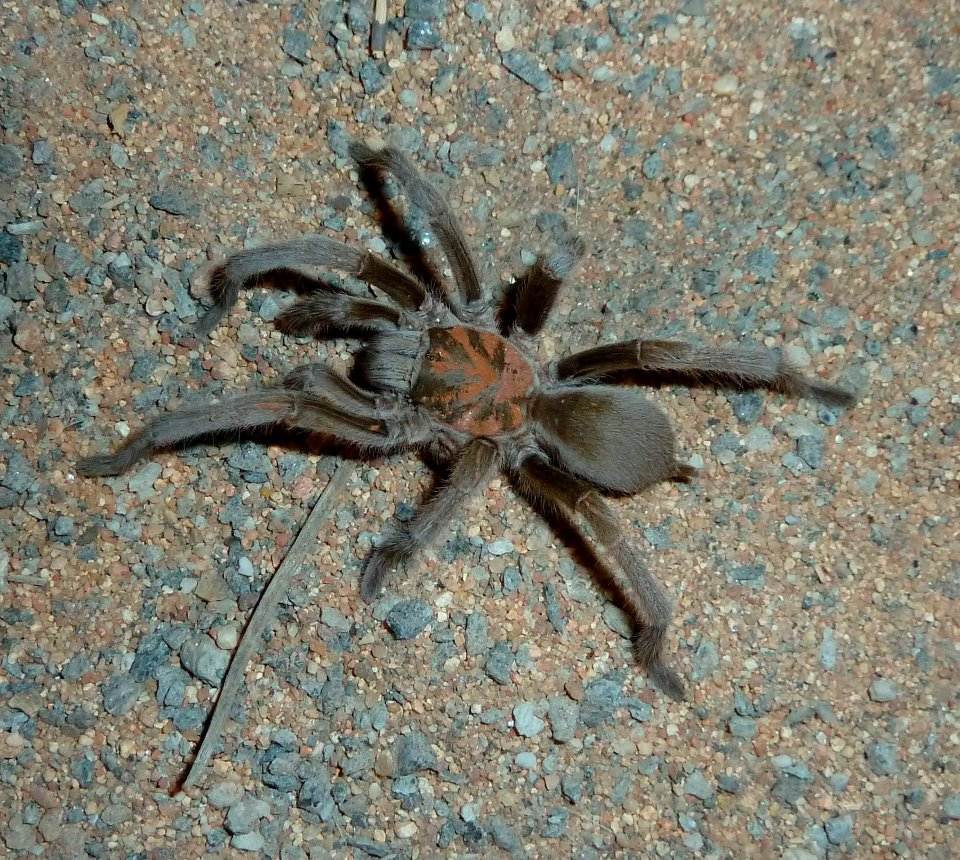

Scientific classification
- Kingdom: Animalia
- Phylum: Arthropoda
- Subphylum: Chelicerata
- Class: Arachnida
- Order: Araneae
- Infraorder: Mygalomorphae
- Family: Theraphosidae
- Genus: Selenocosmia
- Species: S. stirlingi

Binomial name
- Selenocosmia stirlingi Hogg, 1901

= Selenocosmia stirlingi =

Barking spider

Species of spider

Selenocosmia stirlingi is a species of tarantula (family Theraphosidae) that is native to the arid regions of Australia. It is sometimes also referred to as a barking spider or whistling spider as this species, like many tarantulas, can stridulate to produce a "whistling" sound when disturbed or threatened. This species is largely fossorial, living in burrows deep underground, however males are sometimes encountered during the breeding season.

== Taxonomy and naming ==
This species was originally described by Henry R Hogg in 1901. However, early research from 1894 had noted that this species could produce an audible sound. Selenocosmia stirlingi is a member of the Selenocosmiinae subfamily, which is widespread throughout Australia and South-East Asia.

== Habitat ==
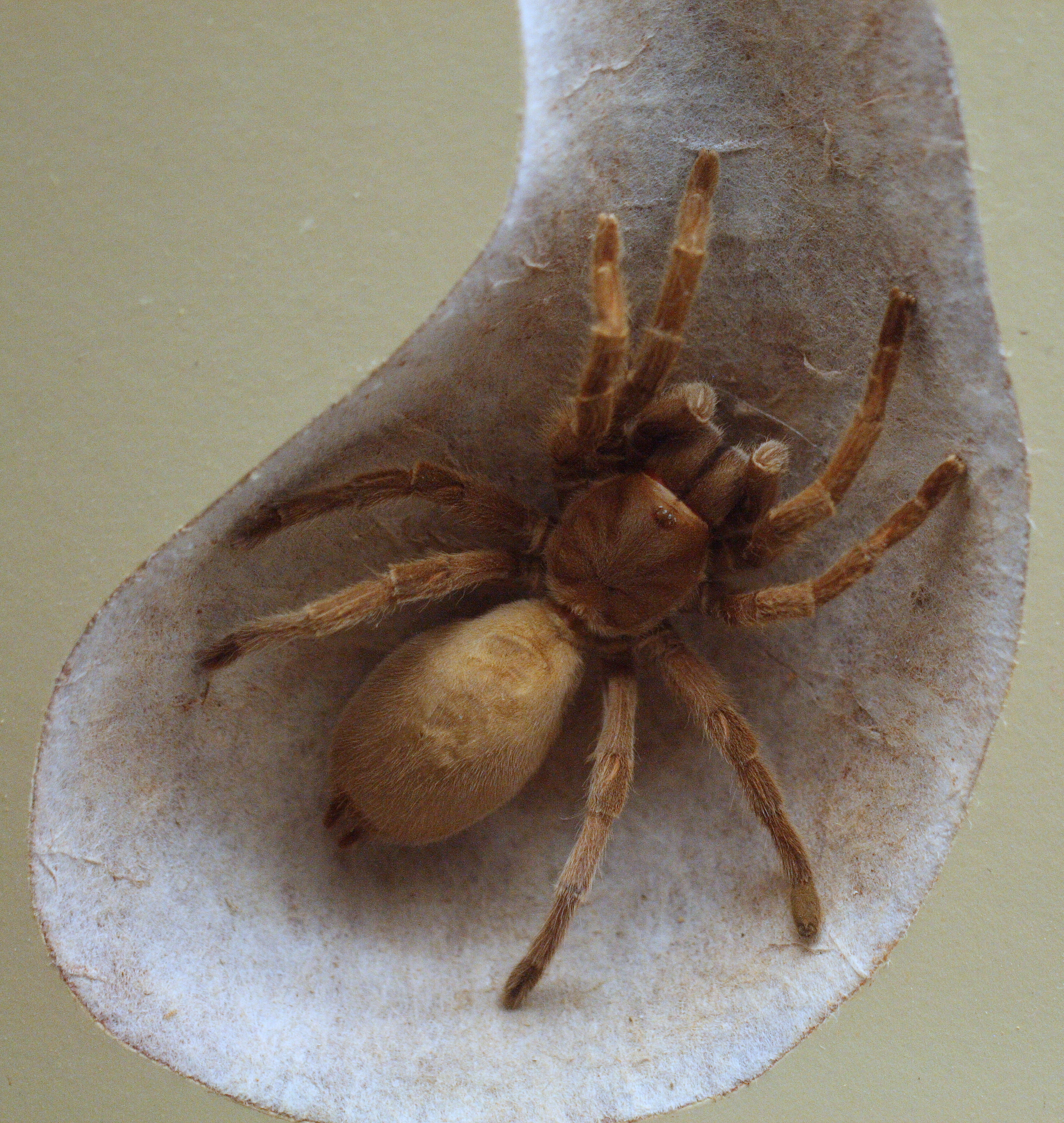
Display in the Australian Museum

Barking spiders live in the Australian desert and are ambush predators from burrows placed among leaf litter or desert shrub. The entrance to the burrow is sometimes lined with spider silk.

== Prey ==
Barking spiders wait in their burrows for insects, lizards or frogs to come near the entrance before grasping and injecting venom into them.

== Predators ==
As it is a small animal, the barking spider has quite a lot of predators even in the desert. Some of these include owls, dingoes and feral cats.

== Adaptations ==
The barking spider depends on special adaptations to survive in its natural habitat. They have a gill-like lung that requires humidity and strong claws that enables them to dig burrows and stay cool. Barking spiders also have bushy feet with some secreted oil which produces a suction-cup ability, which allows them to easily climb up steep rocks in the desert.

== Pet trade ==
This species as well as several other tarantula species within Australia are sometimes collected and sold as pets. The extent of collecting from the wild has not been well characterised, but illegal collecting and harvesting of wild populations are likely to be detrimental to the species.
