= Selenotholus =

Scientific classification
- Kingdom: Animalia
- Phylum: Arthropoda
- Subphylum: Chelicerata
- Class: Arachnida
- Order: Araneae
- Infraorder: Mygalomorphae
- Family: Theraphosidae
- Genus: Selenotholus; Hogg, 1902
- Species: S. foelschei

Binomial name
- Selenotholus foelschei Hogg, 1902

Genus of spiders

Selenotholus is a monotypic genus of tarantulas containing the single species, Selenotholus foelschei. It was first described by Henry Roughton Hogg in 1902, and is found in the Northern Territory. It is distinguished from Selenocosmia in by a thoracic fovea recurved, along with the first and fourth pairs of legs being of equal size.

S. foelschei was named after its collector, Paul Foelsche.
