= KCNB1 =

Protein-coding gene in humans

Identifiers
- Aliases: KCNB1, DRK1, KV2.1, h-DRK1, EIEE26, potassium voltage-gated channel subfamily B member 1, DEE26
- External IDs: OMIM: 600397; MGI: 96666; GeneCards: KCNB1

Gene location (Human)
Chr.	Chromosome 20 (human)
Band	20q13.13	Start	49,293,394 bp
Band	20q13.13	End	49,484,297 bp

Gene location (Mouse)
Chr.	Chromosome 2 (mouse)
Band	2 H3|2 87.22 cM	Start	166,937,889 bp
Band	2 H3|2 87.22 cM	End	167,032,075 bp
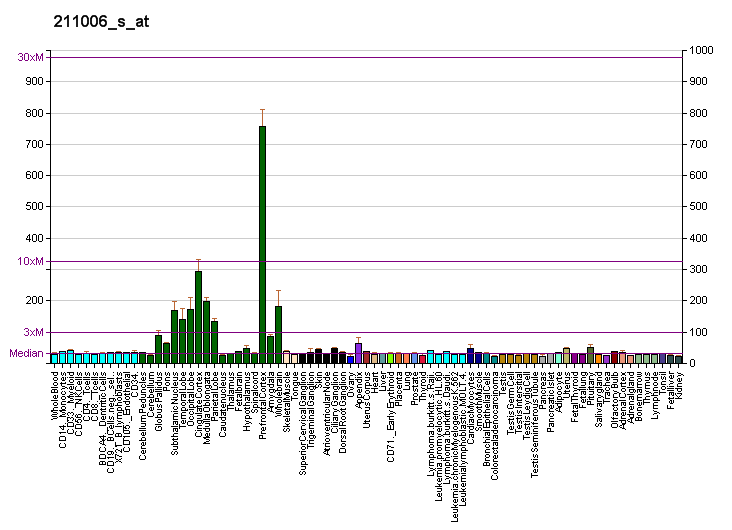
RNA expression pattern
Bgee	Human / Mouse (ortholog); Top expressed in: Brodmann area 23; parietal lobe; postcentral gyrus; middle temporal gyrus; superior frontal gyrus; entorhinal cortex; occipital lobe; primary visual cortex; endothelial cell; optic nerve / Top expressed in: neural layer of retina; retinal pigment epithelium; lumbar spinal ganglion; olfactory tubercle; superior frontal gyrus; prefrontal cortex; habenula; primary visual cortex; primary motor cortex; anterior amygdaloid area; More reference expression data
BioGPS	More reference expression data
Gene ontology
Molecular function	potassium channel activity; transmembrane transporter binding; voltage-gated ion channel activity; ion channel activity; protein binding; protein heterodimerization activity; voltage-gated potassium channel activity; delayed rectifier potassium channel activity
Cellular component	integral component of membrane; perikaryon; postsynaptic membrane; cell projection; lateral plasma membrane; membrane; voltage-gated potassium channel complex; plasma membrane; synapse; axon; cell junction; dendrite; neuron projection; sarcolemma; neuronal cell body membrane; dendrite membrane
Biological process	exocytosis; positive regulation of norepinephrine secretion; glutamate receptor signaling pathway; regulation of insulin secretion; regulation of ion transmembrane transport; positive regulation of catecholamine secretion; ion transport; vesicle docking involved in exocytosis; positive regulation of calcium ion-dependent exocytosis; potassium ion transport; regulation of motor neuron apoptotic process; transmembrane transport; cellular response to nutrient levels; potassium ion transmembrane transport; action potential; protein homooligomerization; positive regulation of protein targeting to membrane; positive regulation of long-term synaptic depression; regulation of action potential; negative regulation of insulin secretion; glucose homeostasis; cellular response to glucose stimulus; protein localization to plasma membrane
Sources:Amigo / QuickGO
Orthologs
Databases	NCBI: entry; OMA: entry
Species	Human	Mouse
Entrez	3745	16500
Ensembl	ENSG00000158445	ENSMUSG00000050556
UniProt	Q14721	Q03717
RefSeq (mRNA)	NM_004975	NM_008420
RefSeq (protein)	NP_004966	NP_032446
Location (UCSC)	Chr 20: 49.29 – 49.48 Mb	Chr 2: 166.94 – 167.03 Mb
PubMed search
- Wikidata
View/Edit Human	View/Edit Mouse

Potassium voltage-gated channel, Shab-related subfamily, member 1, also known as KCNB1 or K_{v}2.1, is a protein that, in humans, is encoded by the KCNB1 gene.

Potassium voltage-gated channel subfamily B member one, or simply known as KCNB1, is a delayed rectifier and voltage-gated potassium channel found throughout the body. The channel has a diverse number of functions. However, its main function, as a delayed rectifier, is to propagate current in its respective location. It is commonly expressed in the central nervous system, but may also be found in pulmonary arteries, auditory outer hair cells, stem cells, the retina, and organs such as the heart and pancreas. Modulation of K+ channel activity and expression has been found to be at the crux of many profound pathophysiological disorders in several cell types.

Potassium channels are among the most diverse of all ion channels in eukaryotes. With over 100 genes coding numerous functions, many isoforms of potassium channels are present in the body, but most are divided up into two main groups: inactivating transient channels and non-inactivating delayed rectifiers. Due to the multiple varied forms, potassium delayed rectifier channels open or close in response to a myriad of signals. These include: cell depolarization or hyperpolarization, increases in intracellular calcium concentrations, neurotransmitter binding, or second messenger activity such as G-proteins or kinases.

== Structure ==
The general structure of all potassium channels contain a centered pore composed of alpha subunits with a pore loop expressed by a segment of conserved DNA, T/SxxTxGxG. This general sequence comprises the selectivity of the potassium channel. Depending on the channel, the alpha subunits are constructed in either a homo- or hetero-association, creating a 4-subunit selectivity pore or a 2-subunit pore, each with accessory beta subunits attached intracellularly. Also on the cytoplasmic side are the N- and C- termini, which play a crucial role in activating and deactivating KCNB1 channels. This pore creates the main opening of the channel where potassium ions flow through.

The type of pore domain (number of subunits) determines if the channel has the typical 6 transmembrane (protein) spanning regions, or the less dominant inward rectifier type of only 2 regions. KCNB1 has 6TM labeled S1-S6, each with a tetrameric structure. S5 and S6 create the p-loop, while S4 is the location of the voltage sensor. S4, along with S2 and S3 create the ‘activating’ portions of the delayed rectifier channel. The heteromeric complexes that contain the distinct pore are electrically inactive or non-conducting, but unlike other potassium families, the pore of the KCNB1 group has numerous phosphorylation sites allowing kinase activity. Maturing KCNB1 channels develop these phosphorylation sites within the channel pore, but lack a glycosylation stage in the N-terminus.

Specifically, the KCNB1 delayed rectifier channel conducts a potassium current (K+). This mediates high frequency firing due to the phosphorylation sites located within the channel via kinases and a major calcium influx typical of all neurons.

=== Kinetics ===
The kinetics surrounding the activation and deactivation of the KCNB1 channel is relatively unknown, and has been under considerable study. Three of the six transmembrane regions, S2, S3 and S4, contribute to the activation phase of the channel. Upon depolarization, the S4 region, which is positively charged, is moved in response to the subsequent positive charge of the depolarization. As a result of S4 movement, the negatively charged regions of S2 and S3 appear to move as well. The movement of these regions causes an opening of the channel gate within regions of S5 and S6. The intracellular regions of the C and N-terminus also play a crucial role in the activation kinetics of the channel. The two termini interact with one other, as the C-terminus folds around the N-terminus during channel activation. The relative movement between the N- and C- termini greatly aids in producing a conformational change of the channel necessary for channel opening. This interaction between these intracellular regions is believed to be linked with membrane-spanning regions of S1 and S6, and thus aid in the movement of S2, S3, and S4 in opening the channel. Studies on selective mutations knocking out these intracellular termini have been shown to produce larger reductions in speed and probability of channel opening, which indicates their importance in channel activation.

== Function ==
Voltage-gated potassium (K_{v}) channels represent the most complex class of voltage-gated ion channels from both functional and structural standpoints. Delayed rectifier potassium channels’ most prevalent role is in the falling phase of physiological action potentials. KCNB1 rectifiers are also important in forming the cardiac beat and rate synchronicity that exists within the heart, and the lysis of target molecules in the immune response. These channels can also act as effectors in downstream signaling in G-protein coupled receptor transduction. KCNB1's regulation and propagation of current provides a means for regulatory control over several physiological functions. Their diverse functions include regulating neurotransmitter release, heart rate, insulin secretion, neuronal excitability, epithelial electrolyte transport, smooth muscle contraction, and apoptosis.

Voltage-gated potassium channels are essential in regulating neuronal membrane potential, and in contributing to action potential production and firing. In mammalian CNS neurons, KCNB1 is a predominant delayed rectifier potassium current that regulates neuronal excitability, action potential duration, and tonic spiking. This is necessary when it comes to proper neurotransmitter release, as such release is dependent on membrane potential. In mouse cardiomyocytes, KCNB1 channel is the molecular substrate of major repolarization current I_{K-slow2}. Transgenic mice, expressing a dominant-negative isoform of KCNB1, exhibit markedly prolonged action potentials and demonstrate arrhythmia. KCNB1 also contributes to the function and regulation of smooth muscle fibers. Human studies on pulmonary arteries have shown that normal, physiological inhibition of KCNB1 current aids vasoconstriction of arteries. In human pancreatic ß cells, KCNB1, which mediates potassium efflux, produces a downstroke of the action potential in the cell. In effect, this behavior halts insulin secretion, as its activation decreases the Ca_{v} channel-mediated calcium influx that is necessary for insulin exocytosis. KCNB1 has also been found to promote apoptosis within neuronal cells. It is currently believed that KCNB1-induced apoptosis occurs in response to an increase in reactive oxygen species (ROS) that results either from acute oxidation or as a consequence of other cellular stresses.

== Regulation ==
KCNB1 conductance is regulated primarily by oligomerization and phosphorylation. Additional forms of regulation include SUMOylation and acetylation, although the direct effect of these modifications is still under investigation. KCNB1 consensus sites in the N-terminus are not subject to glycosylation.

=== Phosphorylation ===
Many proteins undergo phosphorylation, or the addition of phosphate groups to amino acids subunits. Phosphorylation is modulated by kinases, which add phosphate groups, and phosphatases, which remove phosphate groups. In its phosphorylated state, KCNB1 is a poor conductor of current. There are 16 phosphorylation sites that are subject to the activity of kinases, such as cyclin-dependent kinase 5 and AMP-activated protein kinase. These sites are reversibly regulated by phosphatases such as, phosphatase calcineurin. Under periods of high electrical activity, depolarization of the neuron increases calcium influx and triggers phosphatase activity. Under resting conditions, KCNB1 tends to be phosphorylated. Phosphorylation raises the threshold voltage requirement for activation and allows microdomains to bind the channel, preventing KCNB1 from entering the plasma membrane. Microdomains localize KCNB1 in dendrites in cell bodies of hippocampal and cortical neurons. Conductance associated with de-phosphorylation of this channel acts to decrease or end periods high excitability. However, this relationship is not static and is cell dependent. The role of phosphorylation can be affected by reactive oxygen species (ROS) that increase during oxidative stress. ROS act to increase the levels of zinc (Zn^{2+)} and calcium (Ca^{2+)} intracellularly that act with protein kinases to phosphorylate certain sites on KCNB1. This phosphorylation increases the insertion of KCNB1 into the membrane and elevates conductance. Under these conditions the interaction with SNARE protein syntaxin, is enhanced. This surge of KCNB1 current induces activation of a pro-apoptotic pathway, DNA fragmentation, and caspase activation.

=== Oligomerization ===
Another proposed mechanism for regulation of apoptosis is oligomerization, or the process of forming multi-protein complexes held together through disulfide bonds. Under oxidative stress, reactive oxygen species (ROS) form and act to regulate KCNB1 through oxidation. Increase in oxygen radicals directly causes formation of KCNB1 oligomers that then accumulate in the plasma membrane and initially decrease current flow. Oligomer activation of c-Src and JNK kinases induces the initial pro-apoptotic signal, which is coupled to KCNB1 current. This further promotes the apoptosis pathway. KCNB1 oligomers have been detected in the post mortem human hippocampus

== Blockers ==
Potassium delayed rectifiers have been implicated in many pharmacological uses in the investigation of biological toxins for drug development. A main component to many of the toxins with negative effects on delayed rectifiers contain cystine inhibitors that are arranged around disulfide bond formations. Many of these toxins originate from species of tarantulas. G. spatulata produces the hanatoxin, which was the first drug to be manipulated to interact with KCNB1 receptors by inhibiting the activation of most potassium voltage-gated channels. Other toxins, such as stromatoxin, heteroscordratoxin, and guangxitoxin, target the selectivity of voltage KCNB1 rectifiers, by either lowering potassium binding affinity or increasing the binding rate of potassium. This can lead to excitotoxicity, or overstimulation of postsynaptic neurons. In nature, the prey of tarantula that are injected with these endogenous toxins induces this excitotoxic effect, producing paralysis for easy capture. Physiologically, these venoms work on KCNB1 rectifier affinity by altering the channels’ voltage sensor, making it more or less sensitive to extracellular potassium concentrations. KCNB1 is also susceptible to tetraethylammonium (TEA) and 4-aminopyridine (4-AP), which completely block all channel activity. TEA also works on calcium-activated potassium channels, furthering its inhibitory effects on neurons and skeletal muscle. Some isoforms of TEA are beneficial for patients with severe Alzheimer's, as blocking KCNB1 channels reduces the amount of neuronal apoptosis, thereby slowing the rate of dementia. This has been attributed to the oxidative properties of the channel by ROS.

== Physiological role in disease ==
=== Neurodegenerative disease ===
Oxidative damage is widely considered to play a role in neurodegenerative disorders, including Alzheimer's disease. Such oxidative stress alters the redox sensitivity of the Kv2.1 delayed rectifier, resulting in the modulation of the channel. In vitro studies and studies in animal models show that when KCNB1 is oxidized, it no longer conducts, leading to neurons becoming hyperpolarized and dying; oxidized KCNB1 also clusters in lipid rafts and cannot be internalized, which also leads to apoptosis. These alterations disrupt normal neuronal signaling and increase the likelihood of neurological diseases. Oxidized (oligomerized) KCNB1 channels are present in the hippocampi of old (Braak stage 1-2) and Alzheimer's disease (Braak stage 5) donors of either sexes

As indicated earlier, oxidative and nitrosative injurious stimuli also activate a cell death-inducing cascade that promotes to a zinc and calcium/clamodulin-dependent interaction between syntaxin and Kv2.1, leading to the pro-apoptotic insertion of additional potassium channels into the plasma membrane. These new population of channels aid in the loss of intracellular potassium, creating a permissive environment for protease and nuclease activation in injured neurons. Agents that interfere with the Kv2.1/syntaxin interaction are highly neuroprotective in acute ischemic injury models (stroke)

Increased probability of the channel remaining open can also potentially drive neurodegeneration. Human immunodeficiency virus type-1 (HIV-1)-associated dementia (HAD) may be driven by an overabundance of glutamate, which in turn can trigger increased calcium levels, which in turn can drive calcium-dependent dephosphorylation of KCNB1 channels, which increases probability of channel activation and current conductance. Enhanced KCNB1 current couples cell shrinkage associated with apoptosis and dendritic beading leading to diminished long term potentiation. These neuronal modifications may explain the atrophy of cell layer volume and late stage cell death observed in HAD disease.

=== Cancer ===
Exploitation of this channel is advantageous in cancer cell survival as they have the ability to produce heme oxygenase-1, an enzyme with the ability to generate carbon monoxide (CO). Oncogenic cells benefit from producing CO due to the antagonizing effects of the KCNB1 channel. Inhibition of KCNB1 allows cancer proliferation without the apoptotic pathway preventing tumor formation. Although potassium channels are studied as a therapeutic target for cancer, this apoptotic regulation is dependent on cancer type, potassium channel type, expression levels, intracellular localization as well as regulation by pro- or anti-apoptotic factors.

== Interactions ==
KCNB1 has been shown to interact with:

- KCNH1, and
- PTPRE.

== See also ==
- Voltage-gated potassium channel
- Guangxitoxin
