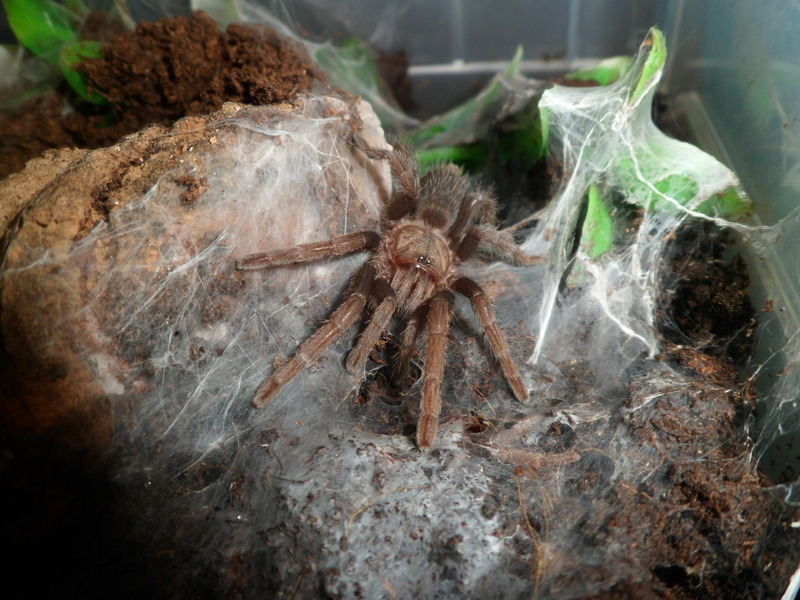
- Haplocosmia nepalensis

Scientific classification
- Kingdom: Animalia
- Phylum: Arthropoda
- Subphylum: Chelicerata
- Class: Arachnida
- Order: Araneae
- Infraorder: Mygalomorphae
- Family: Theraphosidae
- Genus: Haplocosmia; Schmidt & von Wirth, 1996

Type species
- H. nepalensis Schmidt & von Wirth, 1996

Species
- H. himalayana (Pocock, 1899) – Himalayas; H. nepalensis Schmidt & von Wirth, 1996 – Nepal; H. sherwoodae Lin & Li, 2022 - China

= Haplocosmia =

Genus of spiders

Haplocosmia is a genus of Asian tarantulas that was first described by Günter E. W. Schmidt & V. von Wirth in 1996. As of March 2020 it contains three species, found in Nepal, Himalayas and Tibet: H. himalayana, H. nepalensis and H. sherwoodae .

== Diagnosis ==
They can be distinguished by the spermathecae, which is in one piece, which thornlike hairs on the chelicarea and the scopula on tarsi 1 through 4. The scopula on tarsus 4 is divided by hairs.

== Behaviour and ecology ==
They burrow in silk-linen burrows in the ground, and are found at elevations of 1000-2000m.
