= Haplocosmia himalayana =

Scientific classification
- Kingdom: Animalia
- Phylum: Arthropoda
- Subphylum: Chelicerata
- Class: Arachnida
- Order: Araneae
- Infraorder: Mygalomorphae
- Family: Theraphosidae
- Genus: Haplocosmia
- Species: H. himalayana

Binomial name
- Haplocosmia himalayana Pocock, 1899

Species of Spider

Haplocosmia himalayana is a tarantula also known as the Himalayan banded earthtiger or the Himalayan purple-banded earth tiger tarantula. It was first described by Reginald Innes Pocock in 1899, and as its common name implies, it is found in the Himalayas. This species has also been suggested as a pest controller,

== Description ==
Males of this species can live up to 5 years and females up to 15 years. Females may grow up to 13 cm, while males only reach up to 6 cm. Both sexes have a light brown, grayish carapace and opisthosoma, with legs that are mostly dark brown with a tan patella.

== Distribution ==
The species is found in the southern edge of the Himalayan foothills, in southern foothill of Nepal, e g. Chitwan, regions in India e.g. around the Dehradun district, a region of temperate climate with cold winters. It appears to prefer a temperature range of 23–28 °C (73–82 °F) and 65% of humidity.

== Behavior ==
The species makes burrows in moist soil and constructs webs for seclusion. It feeds on other invertebrates, including their species, and is well adapted to kill large prey.
