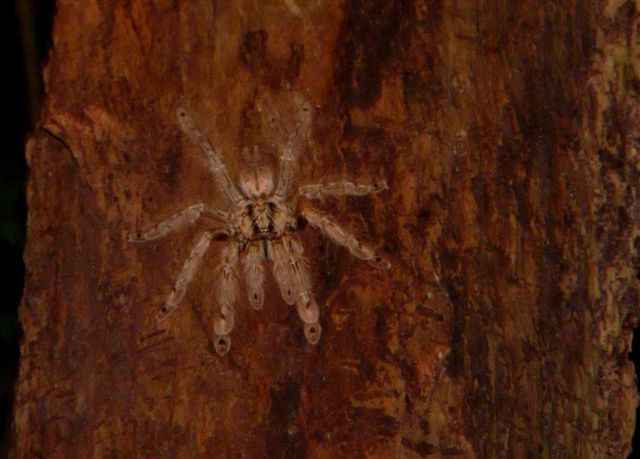

Scientific classification
- Kingdom: Animalia
- Phylum: Arthropoda
- Subphylum: Chelicerata
- Class: Arachnida
- Order: Araneae
- Infraorder: Mygalomorphae
- Family: Theraphosidae
- Genus: Stromatopelma
- Species: S. calceatum

Binomial name
- Stromatopelma calceatum Fabricius, 1793

= Stromatopelma calceatum =

Species of spider

Stromatopelma calceatum also known as the featherleg baboon tarantula, was first described by Johan Christian Fabricius in 1793. It is found in West Africa and has gone through a variety of scientific names during its existence.

== Description ==
Females live up to 15 years, while males only live to 4 years. The carapace is a tan creamy color, with some black striping, the opisthosoma is a tan creamy color with a black fishbone pattern. The legs are the same color covered in orangish hairs.

== Behavior ==
They are an arboreal old world tarantula, creating a tube-like web, in the lower forest regions. They are quite a defensive tarantula, and will usually stay inside their webs until night. Though adults are arboreal, younger specimens have been observed burrowing.
