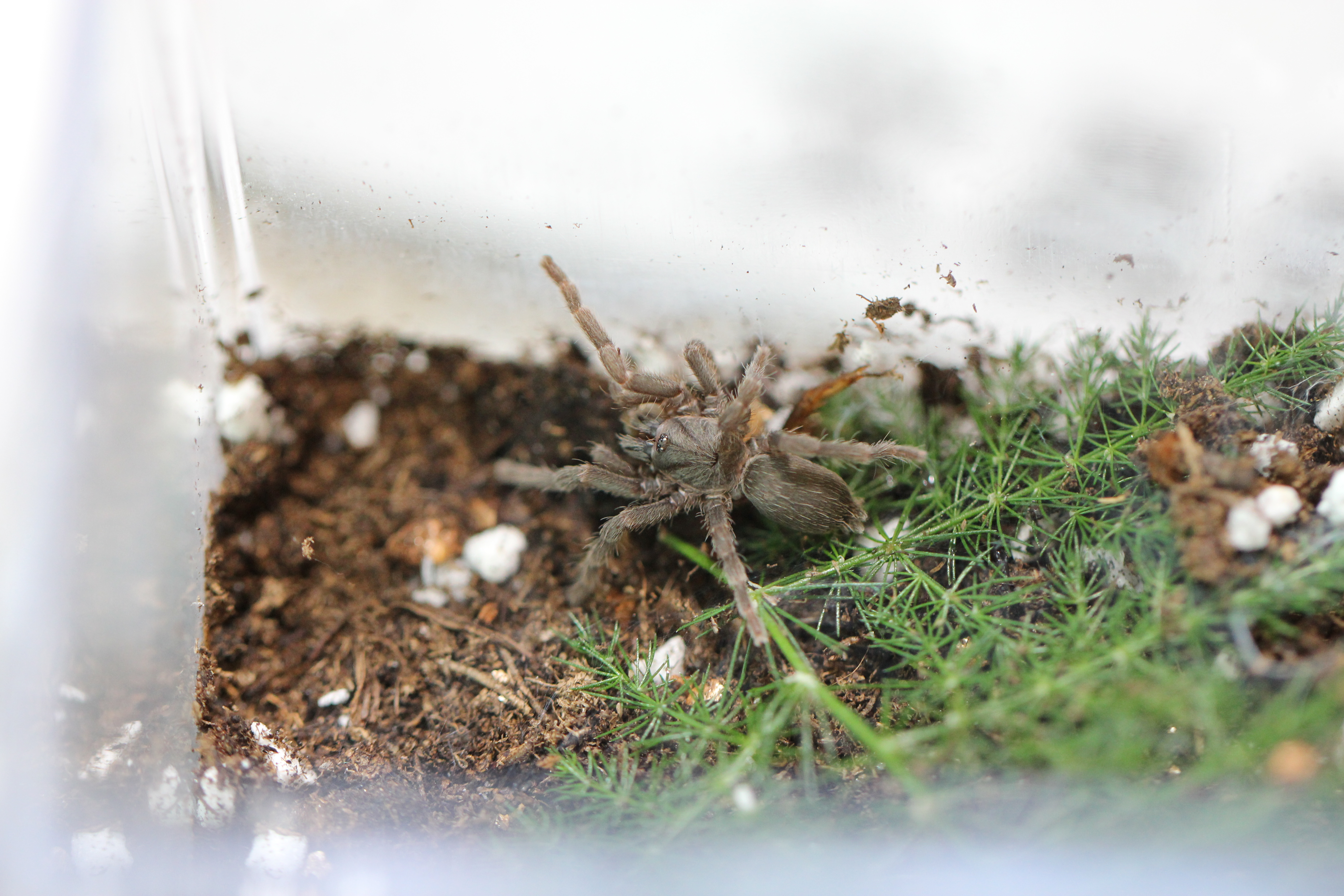
- A young spiderling

Scientific classification
- Kingdom: Animalia
- Phylum: Arthropoda
- Subphylum: Chelicerata
- Class: Arachnida
- Order: Araneae
- Infraorder: Mygalomorphae
- Family: Theraphosidae
- Genus: Phlogiellus
- Species: P. xinping

Binomial name
- Phlogiellus xinping (Zhu & Zhang, 2008)

= Phlogiellus xinping =

Species of spider

Phlogiellus xinping, the Hong Kong tarantula, is a small species of terrestrial tarantula in the genus Phlogiellus first documented in 2008. It is quite peaceful and often stays in its own burrow. It is covered with dense hair, less on the carapace. It is only found in Hong Kong.
