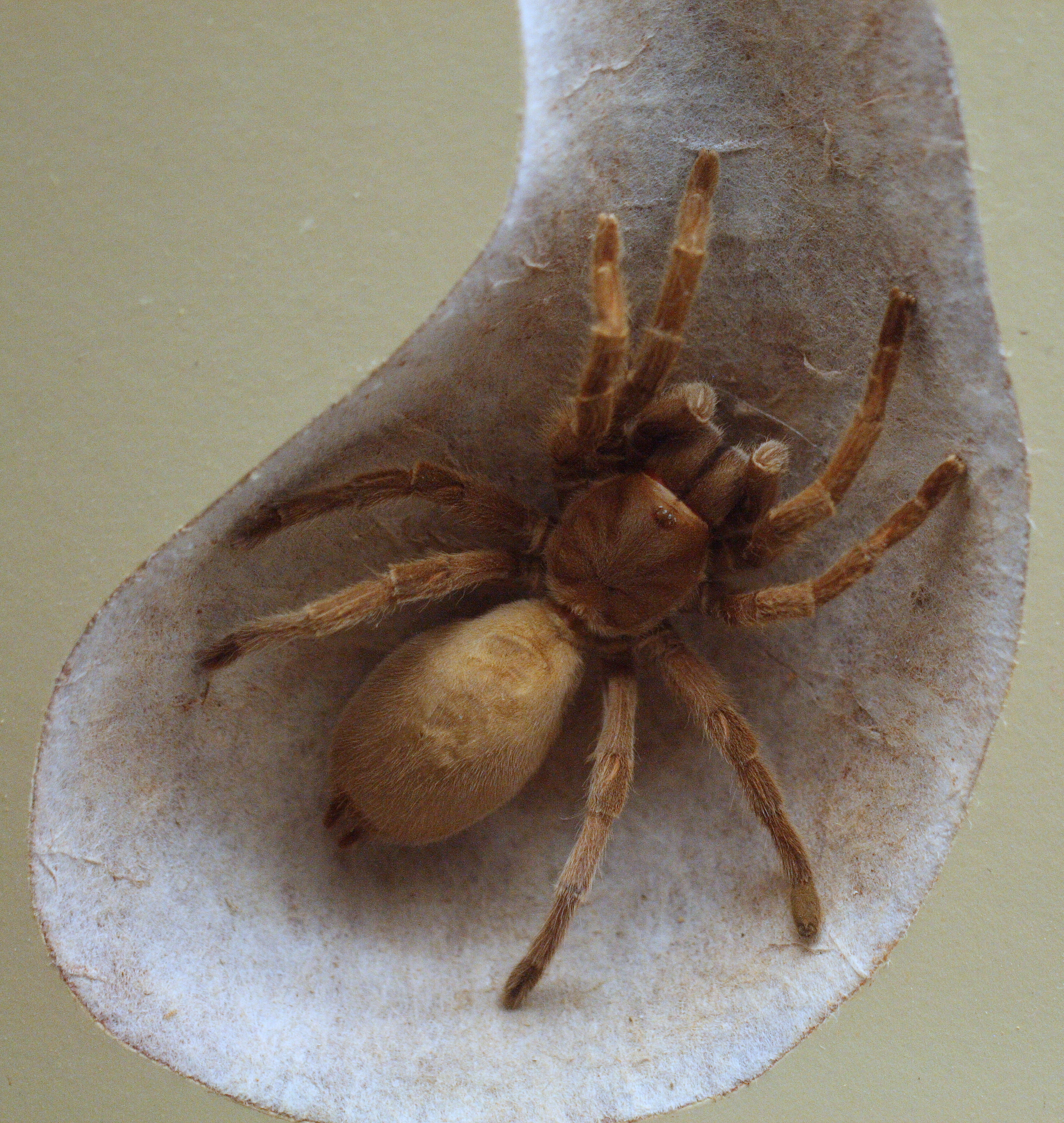
- Selenocosmia stirlingi

Scientific classification
- Kingdom: Animalia
- Phylum: Arthropoda
- Subphylum: Chelicerata
- Class: Arachnida
- Order: Araneae
- Infraorder: Mygalomorphae
- Clade: Avicularioidea
- Family: Theraphosidae
- Subfamily: Selenocosmiinae; Simon, 1889

= Selenocosmiinae =

Subfamily of tarantulas

The Selenocosmiinae are a subfamily of tarantulas (Mygalomorphae: Theraphosidae) found throughout South-East Asia and Australia. This subfamily is defined by the presence of a lyra on the maxillae and strikers on the chelicerae, allowing these spiders to stridulate and produce a "hissing" sound. However some species within Phlogiellus may have secondary lost their lyra but retain their strikers. The monophyly of the subfamily has been only tested using genetic data with a handful of genera or species in a few studies. However, these studies found genera that had been previously placed in this subfamily were actual their own separate subfamily (Poecilotheria) and that Selenocosmiinae is most closely related to the Indian Thrigmopoeinae. As of 2025, Selenocosmiinae contains 13 genera.

== Genera ==
- Birupes Gabriel & Sherwood, 2019
- Chilobrachys Karsch, 1891
- Chilocosmia Schmidt & von Wirth, 1992
- Coremiocnemis Simon, 1892
- Haplocosmia Schmidt & von Wirth, 1996
- Lyrognathus Pocock, 1895
- Orphnaecus Simon, 1892
- Phlogiellus Pocock, 1897
- Psednocnemis West, Nunn & Hogg, 2012
- Selenobrachys Schmidt, 1999
- Selenocosmia Ausserer, 1871
- Selenotholus Hogg, 1902
- Selenotypus Pocock, 1895
