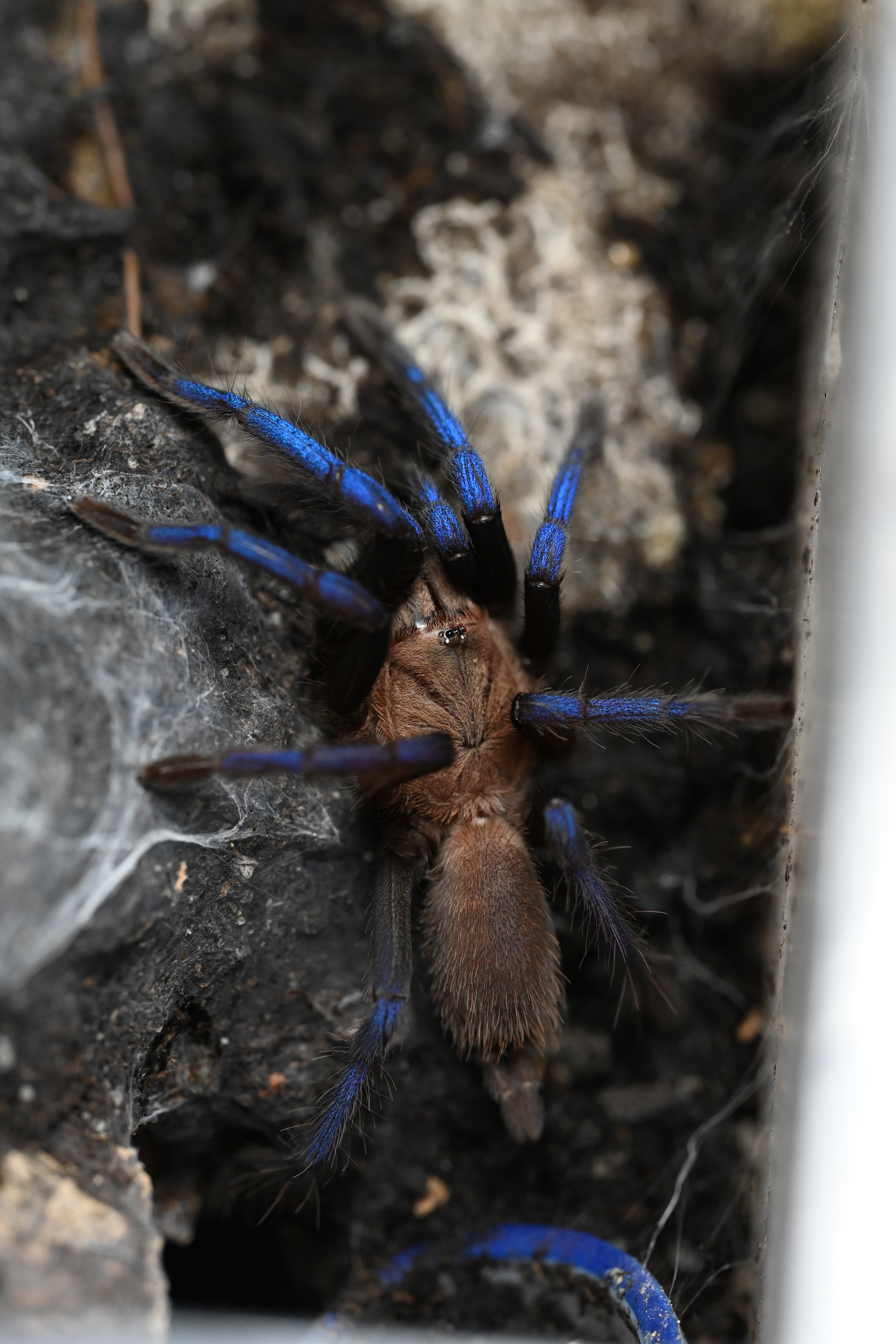
- Juvenile

Scientific classification
- Kingdom: Animalia
- Phylum: Arthropoda
- Subphylum: Chelicerata
- Class: Arachnida
- Order: Araneae
- Infraorder: Mygalomorphae
- Family: Theraphosidae
- Genus: Birupes; Gabriel & Sherwood, 2019
- Species: B. simoroxigorum

Binomial name
- Birupes simoroxigorum Gabriel & Sherwood, 2019

= Birupes =

Genus of tarantulas

Birupes is a monotypic genus of southeast Asian tarantulas containing the single species, Birupes simoroxigorum. It was first described by R. Gabriel and D. Sherwood in 2019, and it has only been found in Malaysian Borneo.
