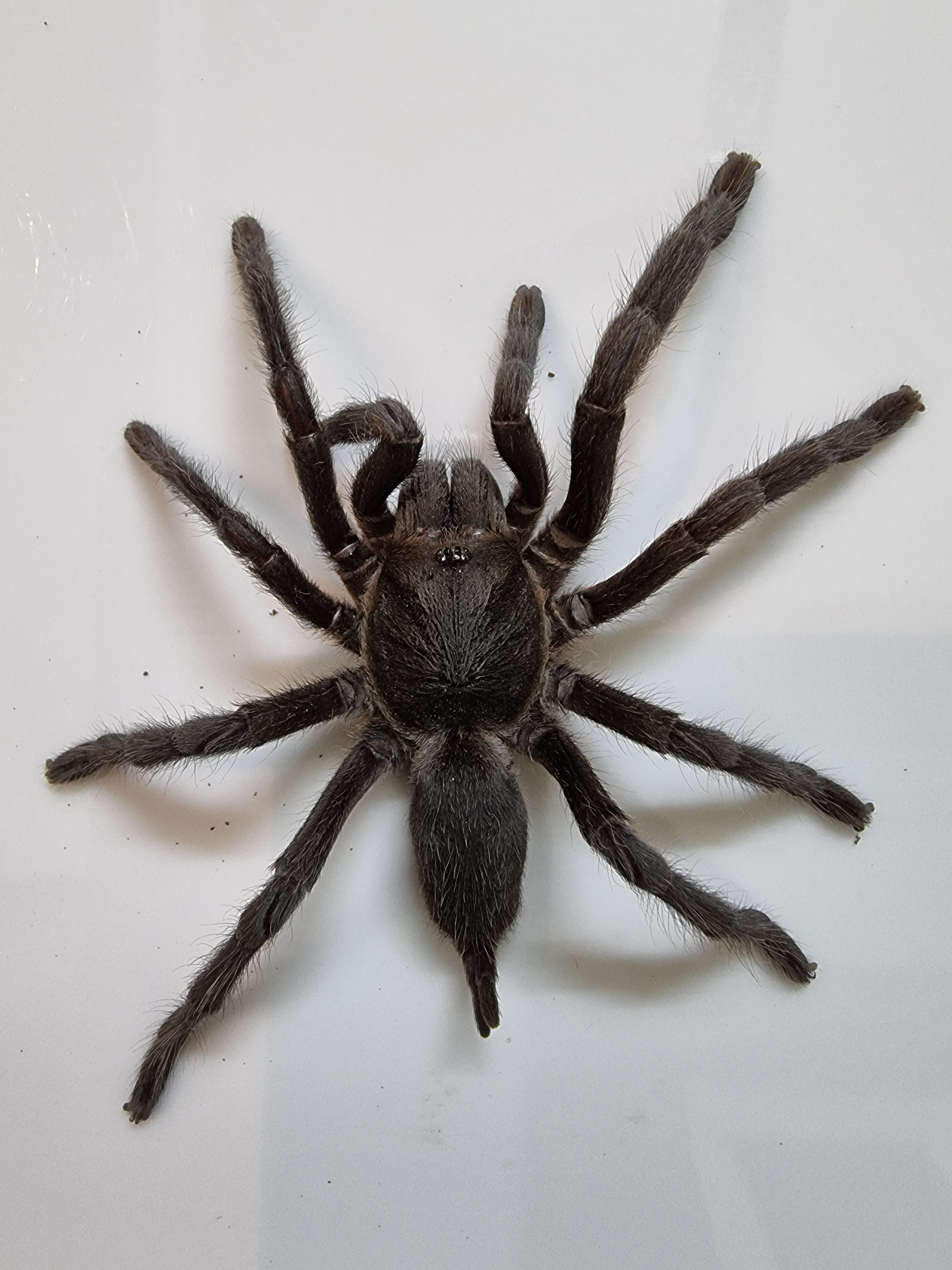
- Selenocosmia crassipes

Scientific classification
- Kingdom: Animalia
- Phylum: Arthropoda
- Subphylum: Chelicerata
- Class: Arachnida
- Order: Araneae
- Infraorder: Mygalomorphae
- Family: Theraphosidae
- Subfamily: Selenocosmiinae
- Genus: Selenocosmia; Ausserer, 1871

Type species
- S. javanensis (Walckenaer, 1837)

Species
- 36, see text

Synonyms
- Phlogius Simon, 1887; Phrictus L. Koch, 1874; Selenopelma Schmidt & Krause, 1995

= Selenocosmia =

Genus of spiders

Selenocosmia is a genus of tarantulas that was first described by Anton Ausserer in 1871. The genus is found in China, New Guinea, Australia, Indonesia, Myanmar, Malaysia, Laos, Vietnam, Philippines, India and Pakistan. They are commonly referred to as whistling or barking spiders, due to their ability to stridulate using lyra hairs.

== Diagnosis ==
Selenocosmia crassipes

In a 2022 paper it was stated that "They can be distinguished from all other tarantula genera by the reduced and shallow apical keel. There is also an absence of dense tufts of retrolateral bristlelike hairs on the tibia and metatarsus of the fourth leg. They stridulate using the maxillae which have lyra hairs, which look somewhat like a scimitar.", citing another article from the previous year. However neither study compare against all Selenocosmia species, therefore it is unknown if this diagnosis holds for all Selenocosmia species.

== Species ==
As of July 2022 the genus contains thirty-six species and four subspecies, found in Asia, Australia, and Papua New Guinea:

- Selenocosmia anubis Yu, S. Y. Zhang, F. Zhang, Li & Yang, 2021 - China
- Selenocosmia arndsti (Schmidt & von Wirth, 1991) – New Guinea
- Selenocosmia aruana Strand, 1911 – Indonesia (Aru Is.)
- Selenocosmia barensteinerae (Schmidt, Hettegger & Matthes, 2010) – Borneo
- Selenocosmia compta Kulczyński, 1911 – New Guinea
- Selenocosmia crassipes (L. Koch, 1874) – Australia (Queensland)
- Selenocosmia deliana Strand, 1913 – Indonesia (Sumatra)
- Selenocosmia effera (Simon, 1891) – Indonesia (Moluccas)
- Selenocosmia fuliginea (Thorell, 1895) – Myanmar
- Selenocosmia hasselti Simon, 1891 – Indonesia (Sumatra)
- Selenocosmia hirtipes Strand, 1913 – Indonesia (Moluccas), New Guinea
- Selenocosmia honesta Hirst, 1909 – New Guinea
- Selenocosmia insignis (Simon, 1890) – Indonesia (Sumatra)
- Selenocosmia javanensis (Walckenaer, 1837) (type) – Malaysia to Indonesia (Sulawesi)
  - Selenocosmia j. brachyplectra Kulczyński, 1908 – Indonesia (Java)
  - Selenocosmia j. dolichoplectra Kulczyński, 1908 – Indonesia (Java)
  - Selenocosmia j. fulva Kulczyński, 1908 – Indonesia (Java)
  - Selenocosmia j. sumatrana Thorell, 1890 – Indonesia (Sumatra)
- Selenocosmia jiafu Zhu & Zhang, 2008 – China, Laos
- Selenocosmia kovariki (Schmidt & Krause, 1995) – Vietnam
- Selenocosmia kulluensis Chamberlin, 1917 – India
- Selenocosmia lanceolata Hogg, 1914 – New Guinea
- Selenocosmia lanipes Ausserer, 1875 – Indonesia (Moluccas), New Guinea
- Selenocosmia longiembola Yu, S. Y. Zhang, F. Zhang, Li & Yang, 2021 - China
- Selenocosmia mittmannae (Barensteiner & Wehinger, 2005) – New Guinea
- Selenocosmia papuana Kulczyński, 1908 – New Guinea
- Selenocosmia peerboomi (Schmidt, 1999) – Philippines
- Selenocosmia pritami Dyal, 1935 – Pakistan
- Selenocosmia qiani Yu, S. Y. Zhang, F. Zhang, Li & Yang, 2021- China
- Selenocosmia raciborskii Kulczyński, 1908 – Indonesia (Java)
- Selenocosmia samarae (Giltay, 1935) – Philippines
- Selenocosmia similis Kulczyński, 1911 – New Guinea
- Selenocosmia stirlingi Hogg, 1901 – Australia
- Selenocosmia strenua (Thorell, 1881) – New Guinea, Australia (Queensland)
- Selenocosmia strubelli Strand, 1913 – Indonesia (Java, Moluccas) and New Guinea
- Selenocosmia sutherlandi Gravely, 1935 – India
- Selenocosmia tahanensis Abraham, 1924 – Malaysia
- Selenocosmia valida (Thorell, 1881) – New Guinea
- Selenocosmia xinhuaensis Zhu & Zhang, 2008 – China
- Selenocosmia zhangzhengi Lin, 2022 - China

Formerly included:

- Selenocosmia dichromata (Schmidt & von Wirth, 1992) → Orphnaecus dichromatus
- Selenocosmia hainana Liang, Peng, Huang & Chen → Cyriopagopus hainanus
- Selenocosmia himalayana Pocock, 1899 → Haplocosmia himalayana
- Selenocosmia huwena Wang, Peng & Xie, 1993 → Cyriopagopus schmidti
- Selenocosmia imbellis (Simon, 1891) → Psednocnemis imbellis
- Selenocosmia insulana Hirst, 1909 → Phlogiellus insulanus
  - Selenocosmia insulana borneoensis Schmidt, 2015 → Phlogiellus insulanus borneoensis
- Selenocosmia nigroventris Marx, 1893 → Phoneyusa nigroventris (Nomen dubium)
- Selenocosmia obscura Hirst, 1909 → Phlogiellus obscurus
- Selenocosmia orophila (Thorell, 1897) → Phlogiellus orophilus
- Selenocosmia xinping Zhu & Zhang, 2008 → Phlogiellus xinping

Nomina dubia

- Selenocosmia lyra Strand, 1913
- Selenocosmia subvulpina Strand, 1907
