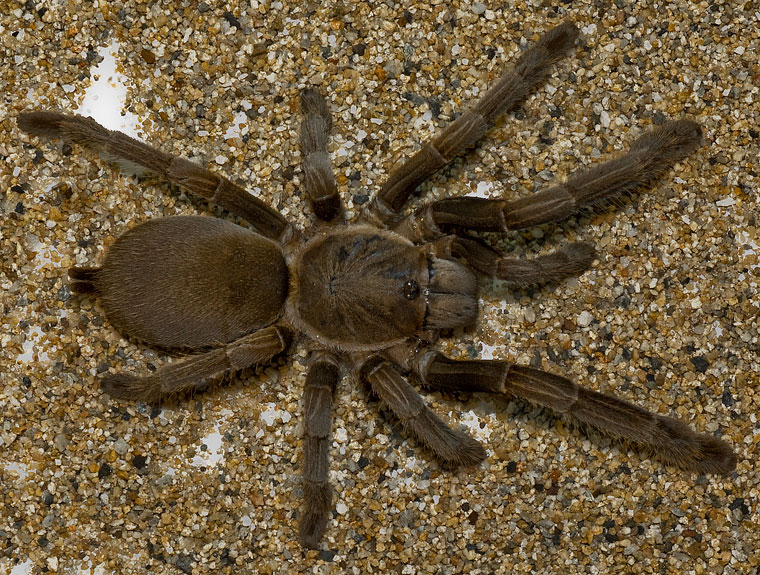

Scientific classification
- Kingdom: Animalia
- Phylum: Arthropoda
- Subphylum: Chelicerata
- Class: Arachnida
- Order: Araneae
- Infraorder: Mygalomorphae
- Family: Theraphosidae
- Genus: Selenocosmia
- Species: S. crassipes

Binomial name
- Selenocosmia crassipes (L. Koch, 1874)
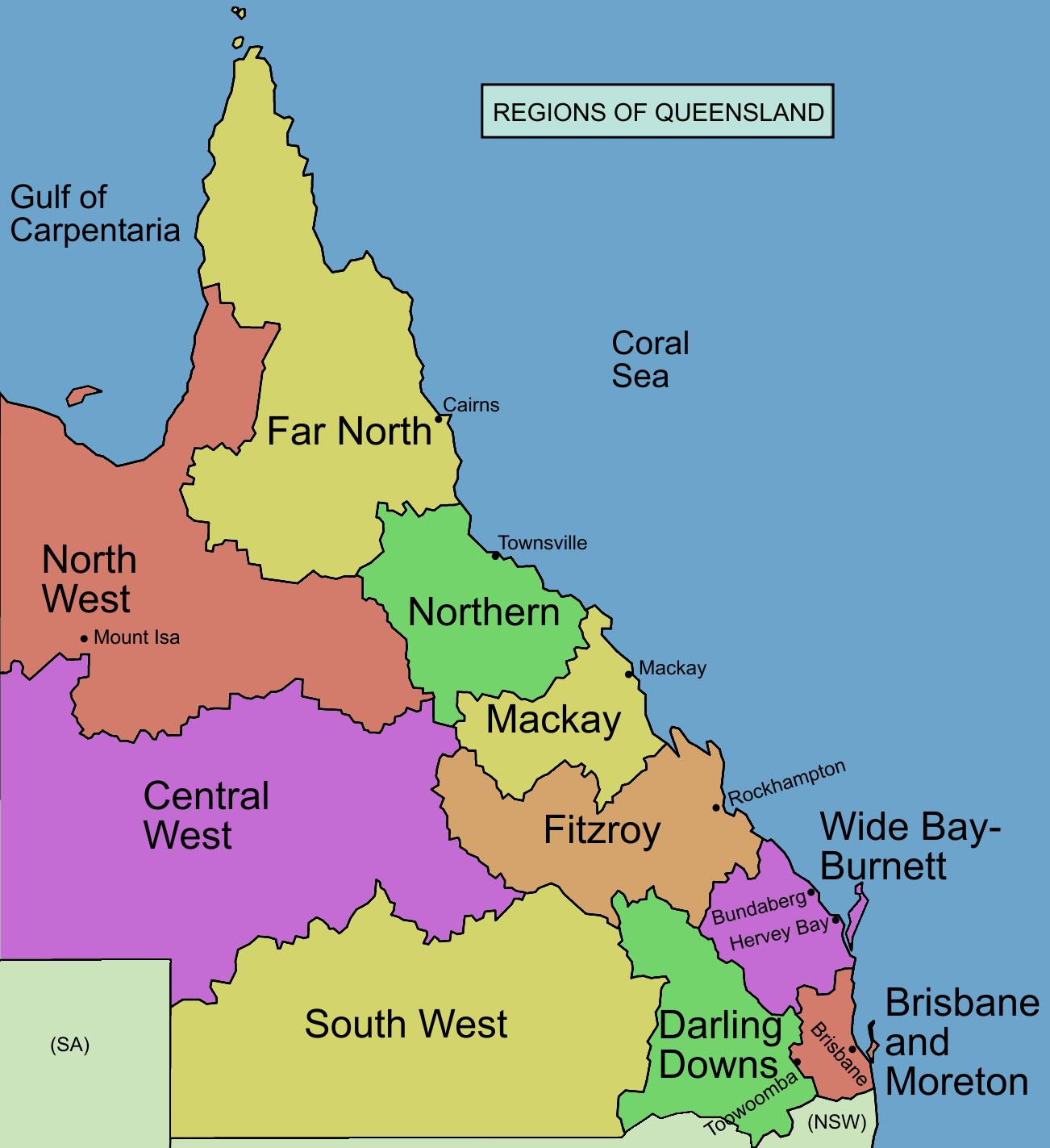

Synonyms
- Phrictus crassipes L. Koch, 1874; Ischnocolus lucubrans L. Koch, 1874; Phlogius crassipes (L. Koch, 1874); Selenocosmia vulpina Hogg, 1901

= Selenocosmia crassipes =

Queensland whistling tarantula

Species of spider

Selenocosmia crassipes, synonym Phlogius crassipes, also known as the Queensland whistling tarantula, barking spider or bird-eating tarantula is a species of tarantula native to the east coast of Queensland, Australia. The name "whistling tarantula" comes from its ability to produce a hissing noise when provoked, a trait it shares with other Australian theraphosids. This hissing is produced by the spider stridulating a patch of setae associated with its chelicerae. It has also been called the eastern tarantula. The species name crassipes is Latin for "fat leg" referring to the relatively fat front legs.

Selenocosmia crassipes can attain legspans of up to 22 cm (8.7 in). Its body length, from eyes to the rear of its abdomen, measures between 6 and 9 cm (2.4 and 3.5 in), making it the largest Australian tarantula.

== Description ==
The thick footed tarantula has powerful long venomous fangs that can grow up to 1 centimetre (0.39 in) long. Its body is 6 centimetres (2.4 in) with a leg span of 16 centimetres (6.3 in) so smaller than the size of a man's hand. Identification is relatively simple as this very large spider has thicker front legs than back legs. It is recognized as the largest spider in Australia. Due to the hissing sound the spider makes when approached, it has acquired the nickname "barking spider", sometimes "hissing spider". This species is quite shy and normally does not wander far from its burrow. Females live up to thirty years, males up to eight years.

=== Venom ===
The bite from an Eastern tarantula is not fatal to a human, but can cause up to six hours of vomiting. The venom can cause death to a dog or cat within thirty minutes.

In May 2010 a scientist living near Cooktown, Queensland, was bitten on her right index finger and experienced symptoms never reported before in research literature. The finger became swollen and very sensitive to touch within one hour. "The pain was so intense that sleep that night was impossible. Fifteen hours post-bite, the adjoining finger and upper hand were also swollen and painful." The pain and swelling were limited to the hand and lower arm only (and not systemic as previously reported) and she reported that they had both eased after 26 hours. Photos were taken at various stages of the swelling.

=== Diet ===
Despite the sometimes used common names bird-eating spider and bird spider, this nocturnal ground dwelling species is not likely to ever encounter or feed on birds. These spiders predominantly feed upon invertebrates including insects and other spiders. Small vertebrates such as geckos, skinks and frogs are also part of the diet.

== Taxonomy ==
Selenocosmia crassipes was first described by Ludwig Koch in 1874, as Phrictus crassipes. It was subsequently transferred to the genus Phlogius by Simon in 1887 as the genus name Phrictus was already applied to a group of lanternflies. However Simon did not change the diagnosis or description, just gave the species a unique genus name. In 1895, Pocock did not show a way to differentiate Phlogius and Selenocosmia, then in 1900, Pocock labelled Phlogius as a synonym of Selenocosmia. In 1982, the Australian arachnologist Barbara York Main recognised the Australian taxa as Selenocosmia. In 1995, Günter Schmidt transferred the species back to the genus Phlogius, however the transfer of the Australian fauna from Selenocosmia to Phlogius was rejected by Raven 2000, argued that Schmidt had not compared the holotype specimens of both genera. Therefore the World Spider Catalog only recognises Phlogius as a junior synonym. As all previous taxonomic revisions of this group have been based on morphology only, molecular data will likely be required to settle this debate.

== Distribution and habitat ==
Selenocosmia crassipes is found throughout North Queensland and is a burrowing arachnid, living underground in burrows, which can be up to 1 metre (3.3 ft) deep, but might be forced into the open during periods of heavy rain. Young spiders find natural burrows under rocks or roots. Adults expand their burrows up to 2 metres (6.6 ft) lined with silk with a tunnel off the main tunnel going upwards to a chamber with an air pocket sufficient to last a few days. It lives in rainforests and gullies or other sheltered cooler spots in open forests along the Queensland Central coast. It is also found in and around gardens or other plant life.

== As a pet ==
Selenocosmia crassipes is a fast-growing spider and widely sought after as a pet. It is harvested from the wild, often illegally, which is a threat to its natural population.
