= Chilobrachys guangxiensis =

Scientific classification
- Kingdom: Animalia
- Phylum: Arthropoda
- Subphylum: Chelicerata
- Class: Arachnida
- Order: Araneae
- Infraorder: Mygalomorphae
- Family: Theraphosidae
- Genus: Chilobrachys
- Species: C. guangxiensis

Binomial name
- Chilobrachys guangxiensis (Yin & Tan, 2000)

Synonyms
- Plesiophrictus guangxiensis

Species of spider

Chilobrachys guangxiensis (known as the "Chinese fawn tarantula") is a species of tarantula native to China, in Hainan. Despite the name, the spider probably does not occur in Guangxi.

Note that species Chilobrachys jingzhao, identified in 2001, was found to be a synonym of Chilobrachys guangxiensis in 2008.
