= Stromatoxin =

Spider toxin

Stromatoxin is a spider toxin that blocks certain delayed-rectifier and A-type voltage-gated potassium channels.

== Etymology ==
Stromatoxin was first identified in the venom of the African tarantula Stromatopelma calceatum (the featherleg baboon spider), from which it derives its name. The technical abbreviation for the toxin is ScTx1. (Escoubas et al. 2002)

== Chemistry ==
Stromatoxin is a peptide consisting of 34 amino acids that belongs to the structural family of ‘inhibitor cystine knot’ spider peptides. The toxin was identified using a systematical screening of the effects of toxins of several species of tarantulas on Kv2-channels of Xenopus laevis (the African clawed frog) (Escoubas et al. 2002). Bioassay guided fractionation and chromatography identified stromatoxin as the functional component. The full sequence of the venom was obtained in a single run of Edman sequencing and confirmed by mass spectrometry. The sequence of this toxin is ‘dctrmfgacr rdsdccphlg ckptskycaw dgti’, for an explanation of these symbols, see the list of standard amino acids.

== Target ==
Stromatoxin blocks the delayed-rectifier type potassium channels Kv2.1, Kv2.2, Kv2.1/9.3 and the A-type potassium channel Kv4.2, with affinity (IC_{50}) of 12.7 nM, 21.4 nM, 7.2 nM and 1.2 nM, respectively. No activity on Kv4.1 and Kv4.3 has been observed (Escoubas et al. 2002).

== Mode of action ==
Escoubas et al. (2002) showed that the effect of stromatoxin on potassium channels is voltage-dependent, maximal inhibition is reached between –30 and 0 mV, while inhibition is only partial at values more positive than +10 mV. The toxin therefore acts as a gating modifier, shifting the activation of the channel to more depolarized potentials. Although the channel can still be activated, a much larger depolarization is needed.

By blocking potassium channels, stromatoxin has a wide range of actions. Its target channels can be found in cardiac tissue, neurons and smooth muscle cells. In cardiac cells, their role more specifically concerns the height and duration of the plateau phase of the action potential, repolarization of cell membranes, cardiac refractoriness and automaticity. In the nervous system, A-type and delayed rectifier voltage-gated potassium channels determine the membrane resting potential, the firing pattern, action potential duration and repolarization. Thus, they are implicated in membrane excitability, hormone release, and signal transduction and processing (Escoubas et al. 2002), (Shiau et al. 2003), (Wang et al. 2006).

The effect of the toxin strongly varies with the tissue in which the channels are expressed. Stromatoxin for example prohibits apoptosis in enterocytes (Grishin et al. 2005) and enhances myogenic constriction in (rat) cerebral arteries (Amberg et al. 2006).

== Toxicity ==
No toxic effects of stromatoxin have been recorded in vivo. (Escoubas et al. 2002) injected stromatoxin in mice, but observed no neurotoxicity.
