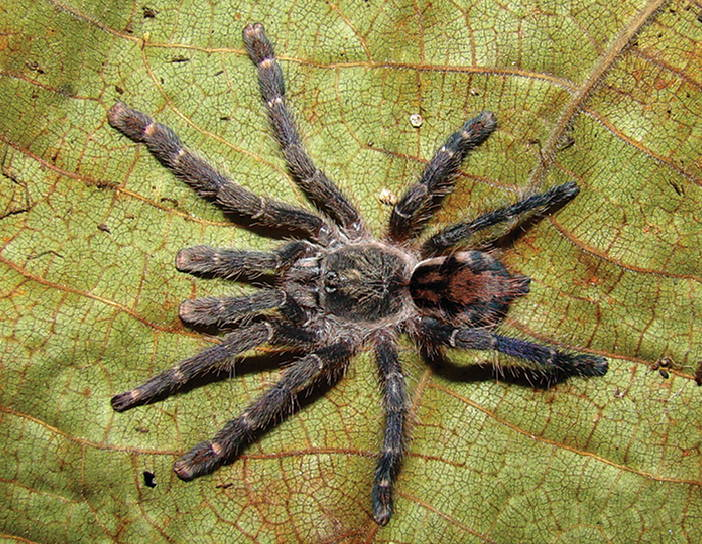
- Female Ybyrapora gamba

Scientific classification
- Kingdom: Animalia
- Phylum: Arthropoda
- Subphylum: Chelicerata
- Class: Arachnida
- Order: Araneae
- Infraorder: Mygalomorphae
- Family: Theraphosidae
- Genus: Ybyrapora; Fukushima & Bertani, 2017

Type species
- Avicularia sooretama Bertani & Fukushima, 2009
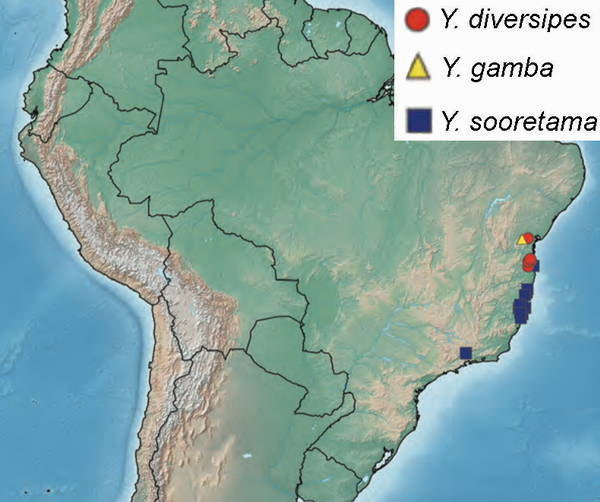

= Ybyrapora =

Genus of spiders

Ybyrapora is a genus of spiders in the family Theraphosidae (tarantulas), found in Brazil. Its species were formerly placed in the genus Avicularia.

== Description ==
Ybrapora consists of species that are smaller than most aviculariines. Females have strongly curved, almost non-sclerotized (i.e. non-hardened) spermathecae. The tibial apophysis (outgrowth) on the first leg is absent or small. Individuals show major colour changes as they mature. Immature spiders have a central reddish mark with jagged edges running along the centre of the abdomen, surrounded by a dark area connected to similarly dark coloured stripes running across the abdomen. These patterns become duller or disappear in adults, particularly females.

Colour patterns

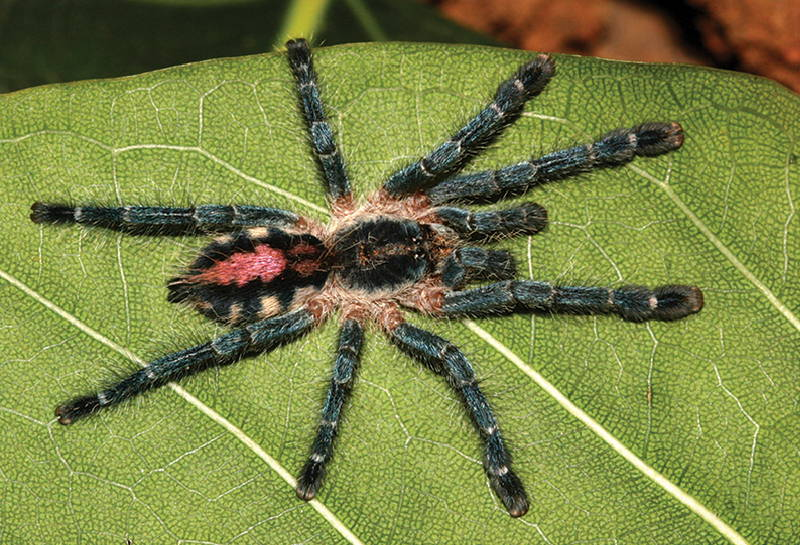
Immature Y. gamba

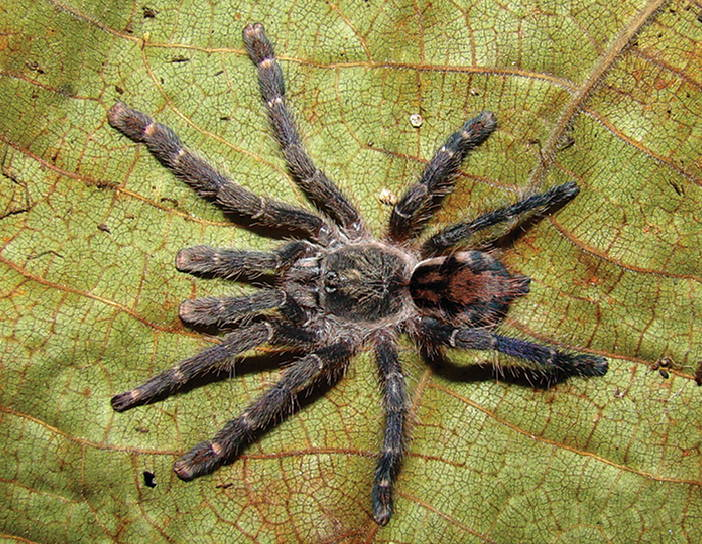
Adult female Y. gamba

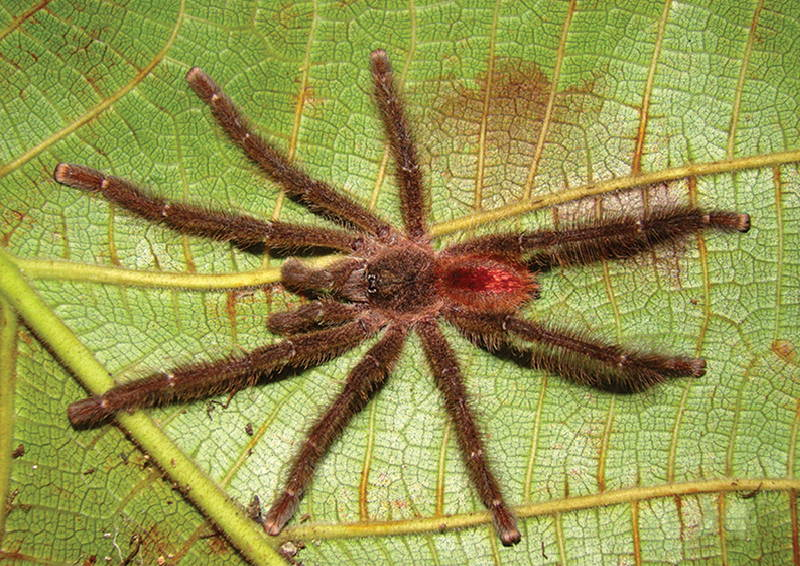
Adult male Y. gamba

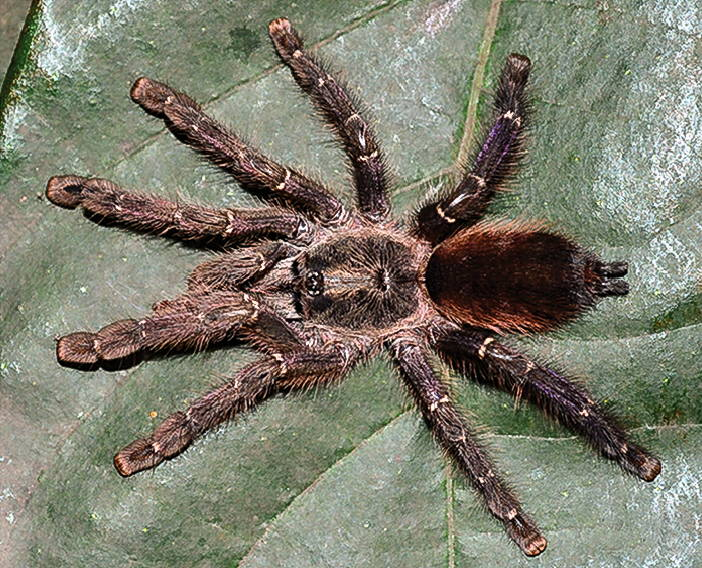
Adult female Y. sooretama

== Taxonomy ==
The genus was erected by Caroline Sayuri Fukushima and Rogério Bertani in 2017 for three species formerly placed in Avicularia which they regarded as distinct, both in their morphology and distribution. The genus name is derived from the Tupi language and means "tree dweller", referring to the arboreal habit of the genus.

=== Phylogeny ===
A morphological phylogenetic study in 2017 suggested that the genus is most closely related to Iridopelma, forming a clade with Antillena, Caribena, Iridopelma and Pachistopelma, distinct from Avicularia:

- - Avicularia
  - - Antillena
    - - - Caribena
        - - Iridopelma marcoi
          - Pachistopelma
      - - Ybyrapora
        - Iridopelma

== Species ==
As of March 2017, the World Spider Catalog accepted the following species, all transferred from Avicularia:

- Ybyrapora diversipes (C.L. Koch, 1842) – Brazil
- Ybyrapora gamba (Bertani & Fukushima, 2009) – Brazil
- Ybyrapora sooretama (Bertani & Fukushima, 2009) (type species) – Brazil

== Distribution and habitat ==
Ybrapora species are found in the Atlantic rainforest of Brazil, from Bahia to the south of Rio de Janeiro.
