= Urticating hair =

Bristles on plants and animals that cause physical irritation when embedded

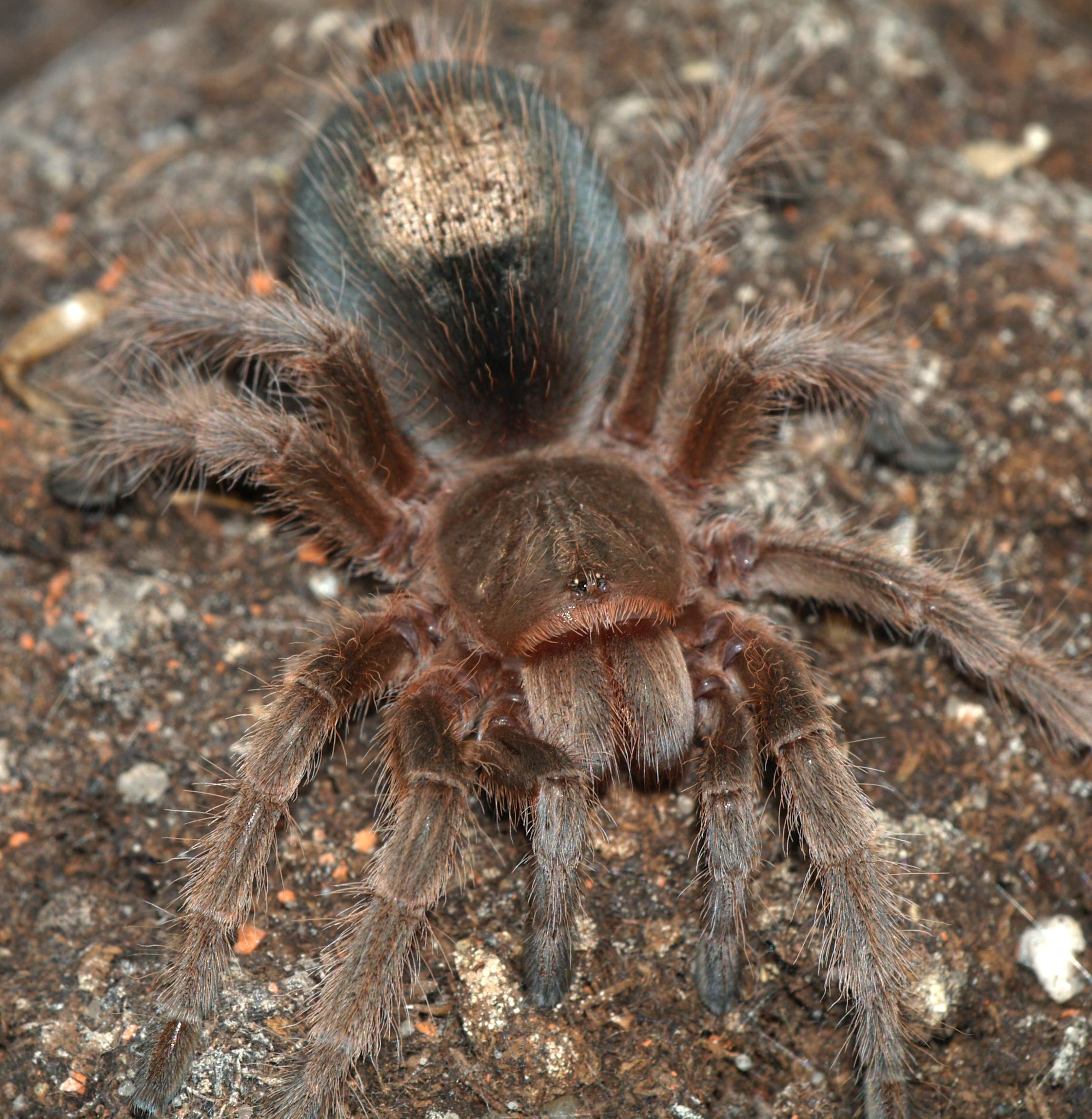
Young Grammostola rosea showing patch of urticating hairs, reflecting a camera flash

Urticating hairs or urticating bristles are one of the primary defense mechanisms used by numerous plants, almost all New World tarantulas, and various lepidopteran caterpillars. Urtica is Latin for "nettle" (stinging nettles are in the genus Urtica), and bristles that urticate are characteristic of this type of plant, and many other plants in several families. This term also refers to certain types of barbed bristles that cover the dorsal and posterior surface of a tarantula's or caterpillar's abdomen. Many tarantula species eject bristles from their abdomens, directing them toward potential attackers. These bristles can embed themselves in the other animal's skin or eyes, causing physical irritation, usually to great discomfort. The term "hairs" is technically a misnomer, as only mammals possess true hairs. The hairs on arthropods are called setae.

== In plants ==
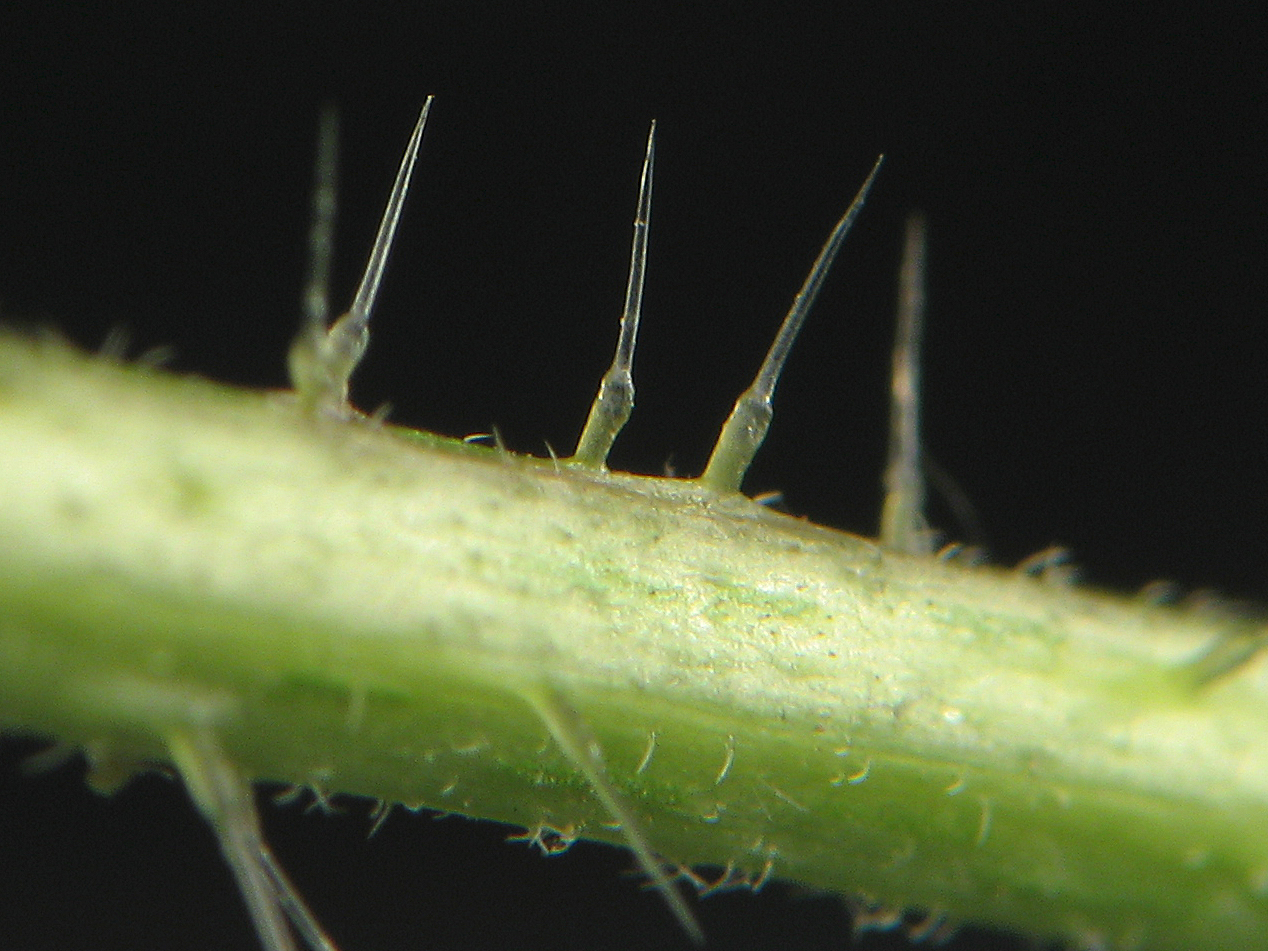
Urticating hairs of a stinging nettle

The most common form of urticating hairs in plants are typified by nettles, which possess sharp-pointed hollow bristles seated on a gland that secretes an acrid fluid. The points of these bristles usually break off in the wound, and the acrid fluid is pressed into it. Various plants unrelated to true nettles (Urtica species) possess similar defensive bristles, and the common names often reflect this (e.g. "bull nettle").

Many cacti of the sub-family Opuntioideae feature fine, loosely attached short spines called glochids. When the plant is disturbed many of these spines fall off and penetrate the skin, causing irritation. Many glochidia are barbed, complicating their removal and enhancing their persistence in the skin. Exposure to glochidia is an occupational hazard to fruit pickers and other outside workers in areas where Opuntioideae thrive, as the spines can persist in clothing and gloves and can become airborne under the right conditions.

== In Lepidoptera ==
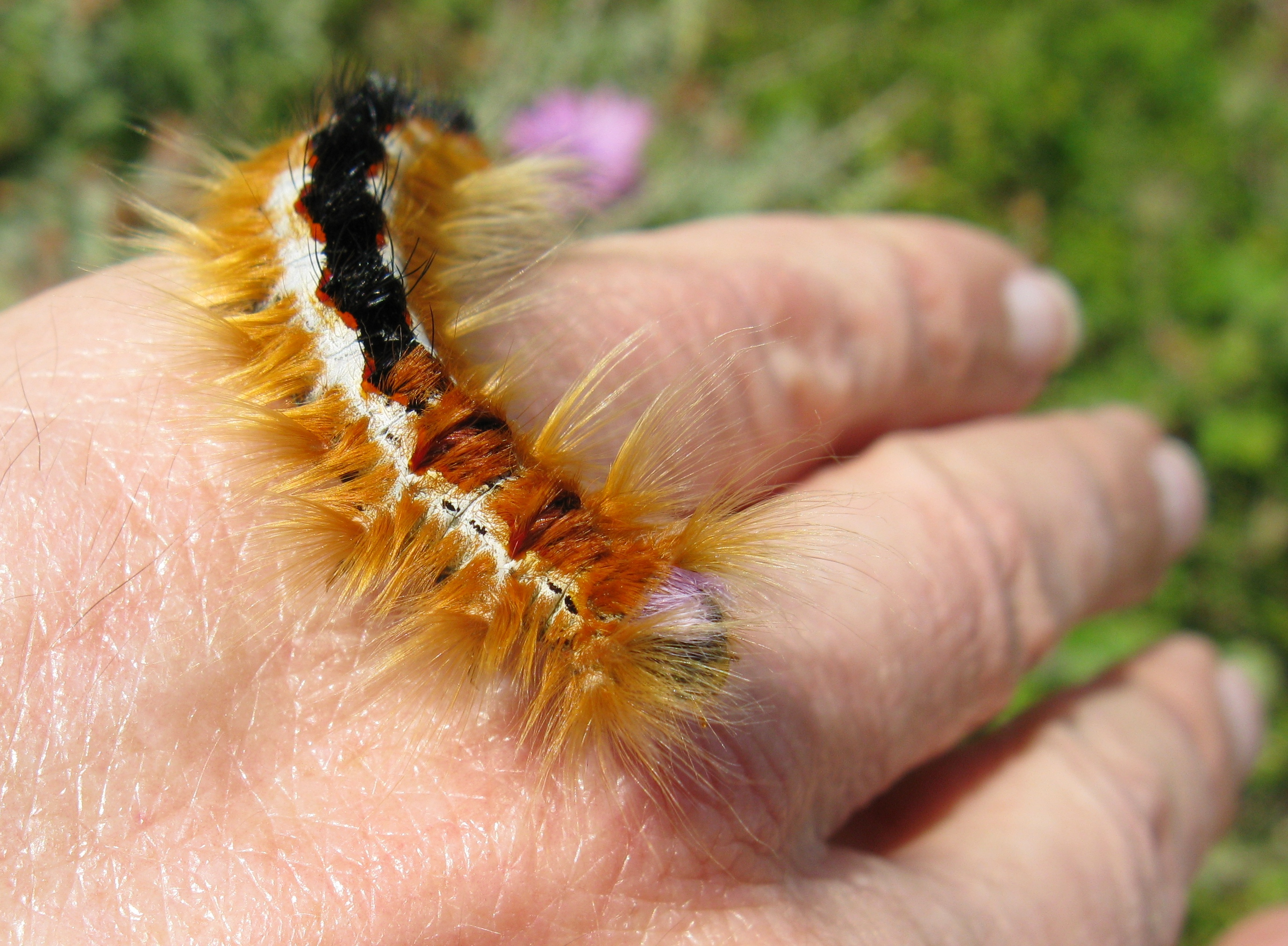
The larvae of Eutricha capensis (family Lasiocampidae) are practically covered with urticating hairs; the most potent are the stiff, short, orange-maroon bands across the thorax.

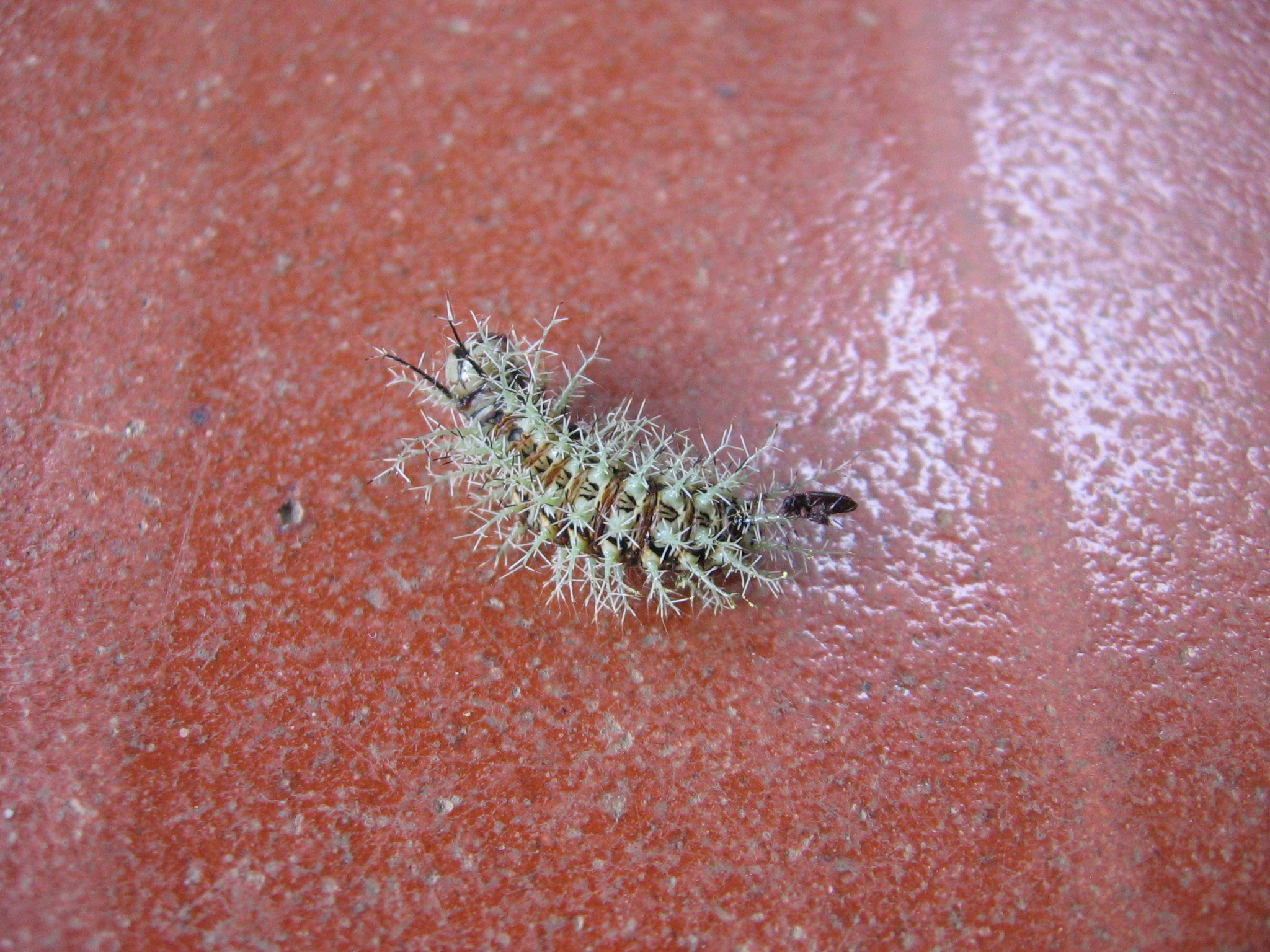
Larva of Lonomia obliqua, the most toxicologically-significant species, to mammals, of its genus; stings are a medical emergency and require treatment with antivenom.

Several lepidopteran families include species whose larvae bear urticating hairs. Families prominent in this respect include the following:

- Anthelidae
- Bombycidae
- Erebidae
- Eupterotidae
- Lasiocampidae
- Limacodidae
- Megalopygidae
- Noctuidae
- Notodontidae
- Nymphalidae
- Saturniidae

Adults of some species also have urticating scales, and some species shed some of their urticating hairs as defense for their pupae and eggs.

The urticating setae, or spines, can cause irritation when they break off and lodge in the skin of larger animals or humans. In some species, the setae are hollow, connecting to venom-producing cells, like a hypodermic needle. Generally, setae are only externally irritating, but may be more dangerous if contact is made with mucous membranes or if ingested; some can cause severe skin necrosis, eczema-like symptoms and shedding. Certain species of Lonomia (family Saturniidae) can inject venom that is life-threatening to humans.

Stings do not often occur as a defense, but are mainly the result of brushing against the spines. However, many species, whose larvae are armed with these bristles, have evolved to utilize them as a defense mechanism against any perceived threat. For example, many larvae in the family Lasiocampidae bear dense bands of short, stinging bristles across their thoracic segments. The bristles are normally retracted into folds in the skin, but, if the caterpillar is disturbed, it will display its bristles, which are usually of contrasting colors; in nature, bright and/or contrasting colors are used by many invertebrates, amphibians, reptiles, fungi and plants as visual warnings for predators, indicating the presence of toxicity, venom or poison. The same defensive adaptation may also be seen as a 'bluff' technique in certain harmless species, in which they mimic the appearance of a similar-looking, toxic, species as a means of protection. For example (in reptiles), the coral snakes (family Elapidae) are well-known as venomous, while the non-venomous milk snakes (Colubridae) appear visually very similar, utilizing mimicry to their advantage.

If roughly stimulated or held, lasiocampid larvae are likely to writhe and lash about, forcing the stinging bristles into any vulnerable surface they can. Many other species of larvae lack any such localized concentrations of bristles and are armed more generally with urticating hairs; even so, they too will lash about frantically if disturbed, making them difficult to handle without suitable equipment. Toxins from the broken bristles may spill out, causing dermatitis on the surface of the skin. For brown-tail moths (Euproctis chrysorrhoea) native to Europe and invasive in other parts of the world, bristles are shed or broken off during molts and can be wind-borne, so that direct contact with live or dead larvae is not required to trigger a rash.

In spite of such defenses, some species of birds feed avidly on "hairy" caterpillars, grabbing them in their beaks and scrubbing them on the ground until the majority of the bristles have been stripped or damaged; at least a few species of cuckoos, apparently, collect the bristles in their digestive tracts until they form 'pellets' to be regurgitated. Examples of predators other than cuckoos that feed on "hairy" caterpillars include several reptiles and insectivorous mammal species, from several continents.

== In tarantulas ==
Urticating hairs (setae) are found in about 90% of the species of tarantula (spiders of the family Theraphosidae) found in the New World. They are not found in tarantulas from other parts of the world.

=== Development ===
Urticating hairs do not appear at birth but form with each consecutive molt, widening from molt to molt and outwardly presenting themselves around areas of more dark bristles on the upper back part of the abdomen of juveniles. In elder ages their coloration shifts to match the main tone of abdomen. Despite this shift, urticating hairs nonetheless retain unique characteristics that render them visually distinct from abdominal bristles, such as their tendency to cover only a portion instead of the entirety of the opisthosoma.

=== Types ===
There are seven different types of urticating hair known in tarantulas, varying in size and shape, particularly the distribution of barbs.

- Type I (0.2–0.6 mm)
- Type II (0.5–1.5 mm)
- Type III (0.3–1.2 mm)
- Type IV (0.06–0.2 mm)
- Type V
- Type VI
- Type VII

Each type of urticating hair is believed to target different enemies. Defined targets for some bristle types are unknown.

Type II is usually not kicked off by the tarantula, rather delivered by direct contact. However, there is at least one aviculariine species—Caribena versicolor—which can kick type II urticating hairs off of the abdomen, similarly to species from the subfamily Theraphosinae. Tarantulas from the genera Avicularia, Pachistopelma and Iridopelma possess Type II hairs (Hoover, 1997).

Type III urticating hairs are most efficient for defense against vertebrates and invertebrates. Types III and IV are the most irritating to mammalian predators.

=== Types particular to species ===
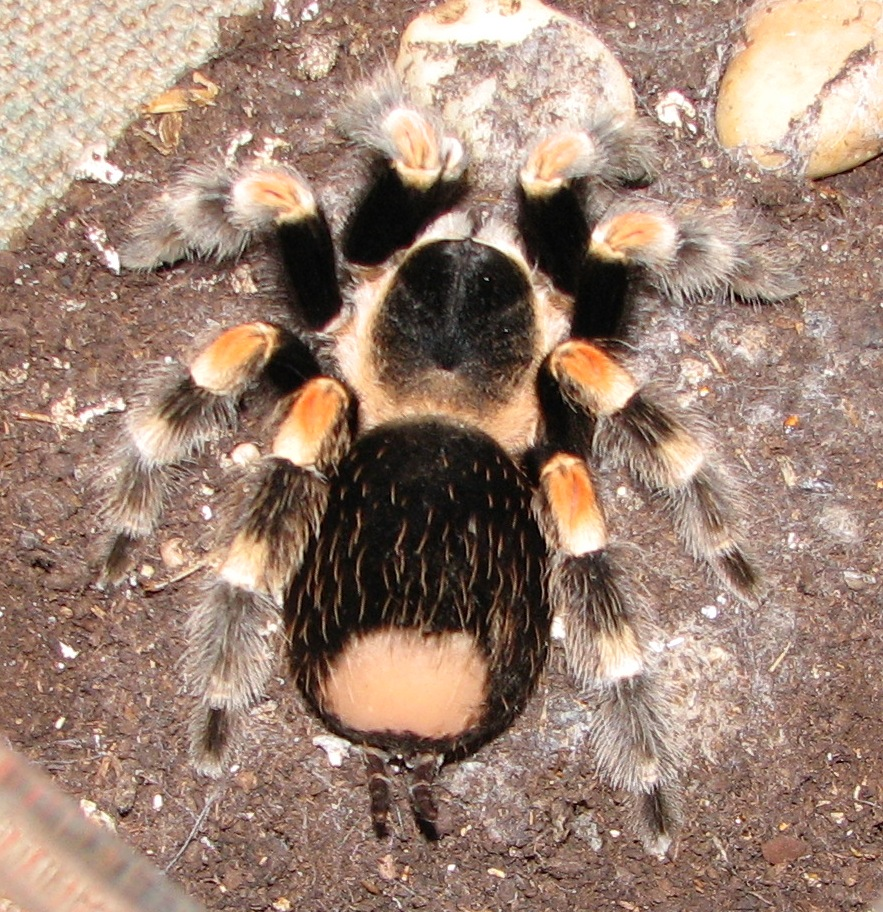
An adult female of a Brachypelma species, showing a bald patch after kicking bristles off her abdomen. After molting, the bristles will grow again.

Not all urticating hair types are exhibited by each species of tarantula. Type II urticating hairs can be found in the genera Avicularia, Iridopelma and Pachistopelma (subfamily Aviculariinae). Type I and III urticating hairs are representative on a wide diversity of large bodied genera in the subfamily Theraphosinae: Lasiodora, Acanthoscurria, Nhandu, Megaphobema, Sericopelma, Eupalaestrus, Proshapalopus, Brachypelma, Cyrtopholis, and others, although some only have Type I in mature males. Unusually, Type III urticating hairs are found only on the species of Theraphosa, but these otherwise are similar to many species that also have Type I hairs.

Type III alone is found in many "dwarf" New World genera, e.g. Hapalopus. Type IV is found in several South American genera, e.g. Grammostola, Euathlus etc. (exhibits types III and IV). Type V urticating hairs are typical of the species of the genus Ephebopus. They are located on the pedipalps. They are much shorter and lighter in contrast with other types of urticating hair. These are easily thrown by the spider into the air. Type VI urticating hairs are found in the genus Hemirrhagus.

Genera with the most urticating hairs are Lasiodora, Grammostola and Acanthoscurria.

=== Defensive behavior ===
New World tarantulas will, at the moment of danger, turn toward the attacker and briskly rub their hind legs against the opisthosoma, throwing the urticating hairs in the direction of the enemy. The cloud of small bristles can get into the mucous membrane of small mammals and cause edema, which can be fatal. The bristles cause both mechanical and chemical harm to the skin and membranes.

Humans' reaction and the degree of irritation to a defensive urticating hair barrage can vary tremendously, based on the species in question. Some, such as those of the Chilean rose tarantula (Grammastola rosea) and the pinktoe tarantula (Avicularia avicularia), are fairly mild and innocuous to humans. Others, such as those of the Brazilian giant white knee tarantula (Acanthoscurria geniculata), are moderately irritating. Still others, such as the Goliath birdeater (Theraphosa blondi), are far more severe. These bristles can result in painful rashes, and have been likened to sharp shards of fiberglass.

After kicking urticating hairs, the tarantula will have a bald spot on its abdominal region.

=== As territorial markings ===
Urticating hairs are not just thrown at an enemy as a first line defense, but are also used as an indication of territory. They can be found on and around the burrow entrance and in webbing for protection (for example, some subfamily Theraphosinae species include these bristles in cocoon silk).

Urticating hairs protect tarantula egg sacs (Avicularia spp. and Theraphosa blondi, respectively). This is thought to discourage fly larvae from consuming their eggs and young.

== Human reactions ==
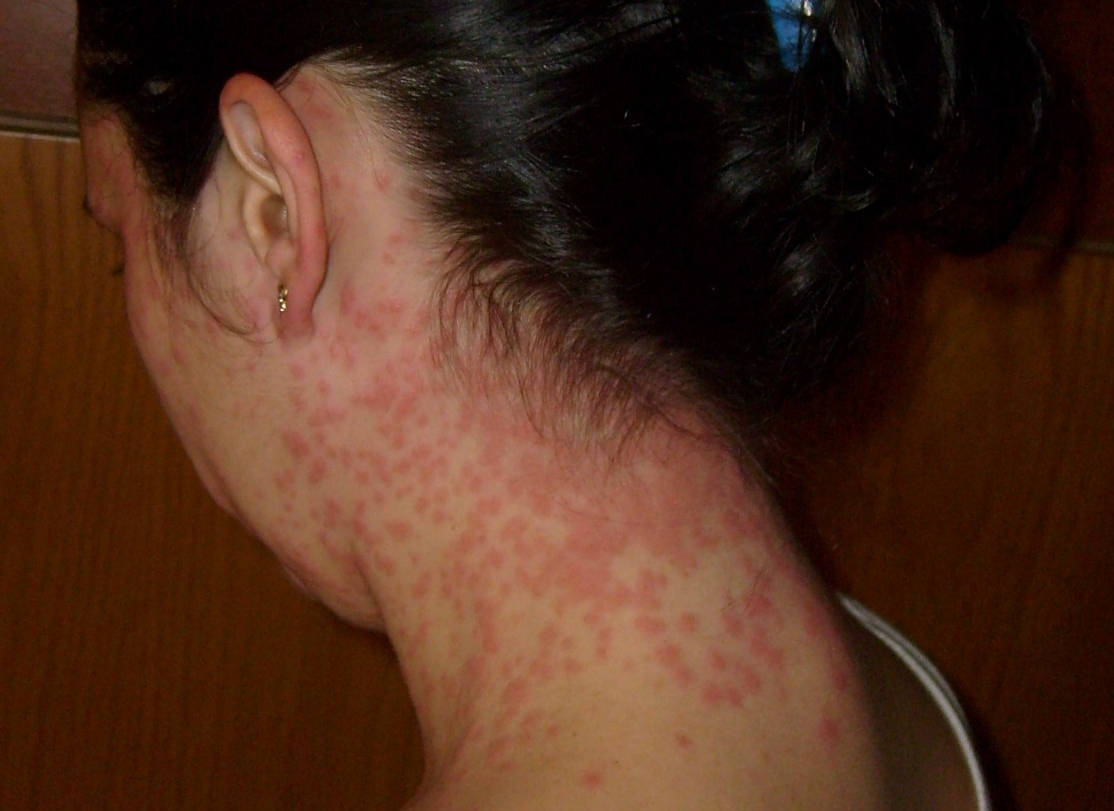
Skin rash caused by the exposure to bristles shed by brown-tail moth larvae

In humans, urticating hairs can cause allergic skin reactions which can manifest as inflammation, rash and itching. The reactions can last from several hours to weeks. Ophthalmia nodosa, an irritation reaction, can result when the barbed bristles lodge in the cornea. Handlers are advised to wear eye protection.
