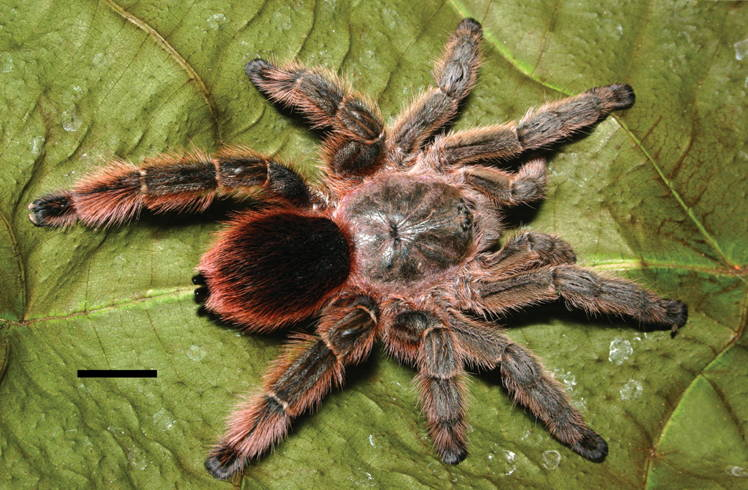

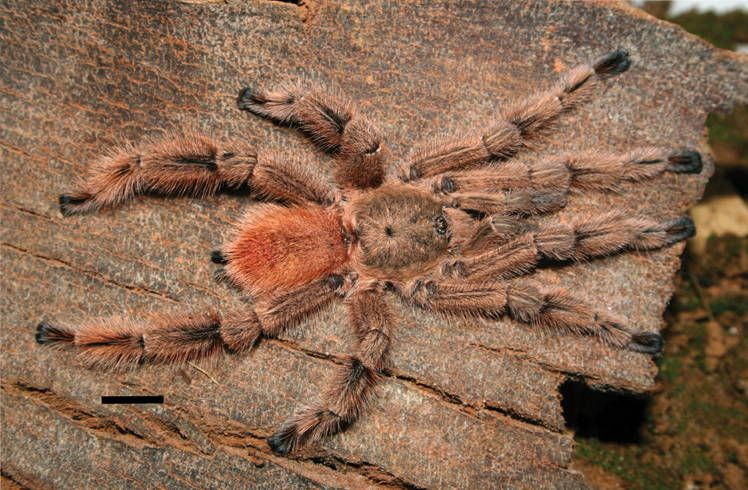
- Above – female, below – male; scale bar = 10 mm

Scientific classification
- Kingdom: Animalia
- Phylum: Arthropoda
- Subphylum: Chelicerata
- Class: Arachnida
- Order: Araneae
- Infraorder: Mygalomorphae
- Family: Theraphosidae
- Genus: Pachistopelma
- Species: P. rufonigrum

Binomial name
- Pachistopelma rufonigrum Pocock, 1901

Synonyms
- Dolichothele scintillans Mello-Leitão, 1929; Avicularia pulchra Mello-Leitão, 1933; Avicularia recifiensis Struchen & Brändle, 1996

= Pachistopelma rufonigrum =

Species of spider

Pachistopelma rufonigrum is a species of theraphosid, contained within the Aviculariinae subfamily. It is endemic to Brazil.

== Characteristic features ==
This tarantula differs from P. bromelicola by having a slender fourth metatarsus, without stiff bristles, and pink coloured legs with black tarsi.

Juveniles are almost completely metallic green, except for a pattern on dorsum of abdomen comprising a central longitudinal black stripe connected with five lateral black stripes. In larger individuals carapace border and dorsum of chelicerae, coxae and trochantera are light brown. Dorsum of abdomen is light brown with a reddish area posteriorly. The black stripes remain. In a next stage carapace is completely pink, as well as dorsum of coxae, trochantera and most femora. Remaining parts of legs retain the metallic green. The clear part of abdomen is now of a vivid red, and the black stripes remain. Subadults have carapace and legs brown with sparse pinkish long hairs. Dorsum of abdomen is still reddish, but the black stripes begin to fade. Adult female is completely brown with long pinkish setae on legs, carapace and chelicerae. Abdominal pattern is lacking or very inconspicuous. Adult male carapace, chelicerae and legs are brown and covered by pinkish setae, except for the tarsi and a stripe on metatarsi that are black. Abdomen is a vivid orange-red, there is no vestige of any pattern.
