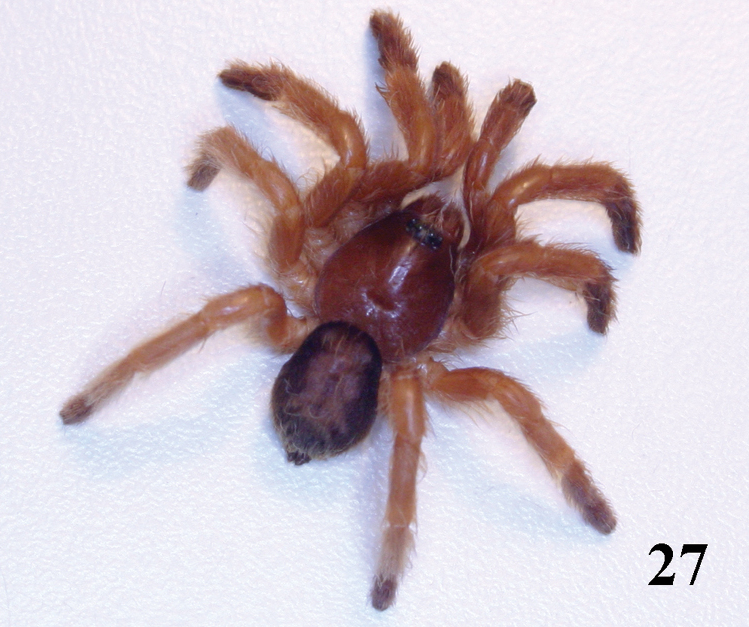
- Female

Scientific classification
- Kingdom: Animalia
- Phylum: Arthropoda
- Subphylum: Chelicerata
- Class: Arachnida
- Order: Araneae
- Infraorder: Mygalomorphae
- Family: Theraphosidae
- Genus: Typhochlaena
- Species: T. paschoali

Binomial name
- Typhochlaena paschoali Bertani, 2012

= Typhochlaena paschoali =

Species of spider

Typhochlaena paschoali is a species of tarantula (family Theraphosidae), in the subfamily Aviculariinae. It is native to Brazil.

== Taxonomy ==
The species was first described in 2012 by Rogério Bertani. The specific name honours Elbano Paschoal de Figueiredo Moraes, a Brazilian environmentalist who died early in April 2011. He was one of the founders of the non-governmental organization Grupo Ambientalista da Bahia (GAMBÁ), and was well known for his efforts in preserving the remnants of the Brazilian Atlantic forest in the state of Bahia, Brazil.

== Description ==
Typhochlaena paschoali is characterized mainly by its short, wide, straight, and multi-lobular spermathecae. It also has a brown cephalothorax and black abdomen with the dorsum (dorsal part of the abdomen) white with a zig-zag border. It is only known from the female.
