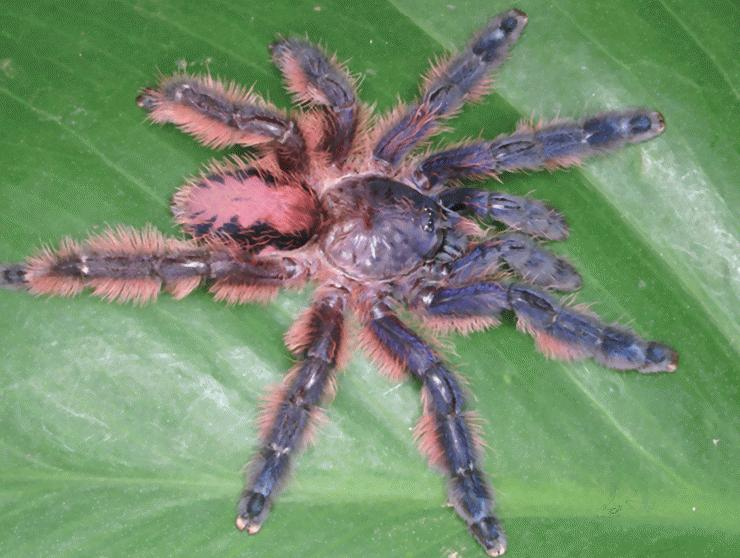
- Female

Scientific classification
- Kingdom: Animalia
- Phylum: Arthropoda
- Subphylum: Chelicerata
- Class: Arachnida
- Order: Araneae
- Infraorder: Mygalomorphae
- Family: Theraphosidae
- Genus: Typhochlaena
- Species: T. amma

Binomial name
- Typhochlaena amma Bertani, 2012

= Typhochlaena amma =

Species of spider

Typhoclaena amma is a species of the Aviculariinae, a subfamily of the Theraphosidae. The specific name refers to the project AMMA – arachnids and myriapods from Brazilian Atlantic rainforest carried out by the arachnologists from Museu Nacional, Rio de Janeiro, who collected the types.

== Characteristics ==
The male is characterized by a medium length embolus, which is quite wide. The male also has a black carapace ventrally, which is pale dorsally. The female is distinguished from other species by strongly curved spermathecae, diverging at their basal portion. She is also more colourful than the male, being a dark, metallic blue with a black abdomen ventrally and pink dorsally. The borders between the two colours are zig-zagged.
