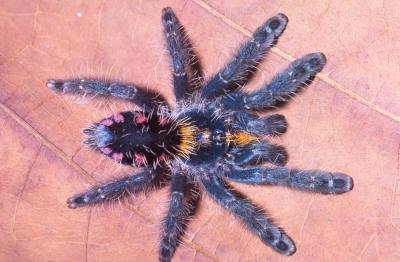

Scientific classification
- Kingdom: Animalia
- Phylum: Arthropoda
- Subphylum: Chelicerata
- Class: Arachnida
- Order: Araneae
- Infraorder: Mygalomorphae
- Family: Theraphosidae
- Genus: Typhochlaena
- Species: T. costae

Binomial name
- Typhochlaena costae Bertani, 2012

= Typhochlaena costae =

Species of spider

Typhochlaena costae is a species of tarantula in the family Theraphosidae, subfamily Aviculariinae. It is native to Palmas, Tocantins state, Brazil. The species shows an arboreal trapdoor lifestyle.

== Taxonomy ==
Typhochlaena costae was first described by Rogério Bertani in 2012. The specific name honors Miriam Costa, who collected the holotype and several other spider taxa during her several years at Instituto Butantan.

== Characteristics ==
Typhochlaena costae is known from males and females. The male has a thinner and shorter embolus than other Typhochlaena species. The female has non-spiraled spermathecae, which diverge in the basal sections and are quite long. In both genders the abdomen is black, with three red spots laterally. The chelicerae and the very most anterior dorsal edge of the cephalothorax (which is otherwise brown) have long, and very stiff setae.
