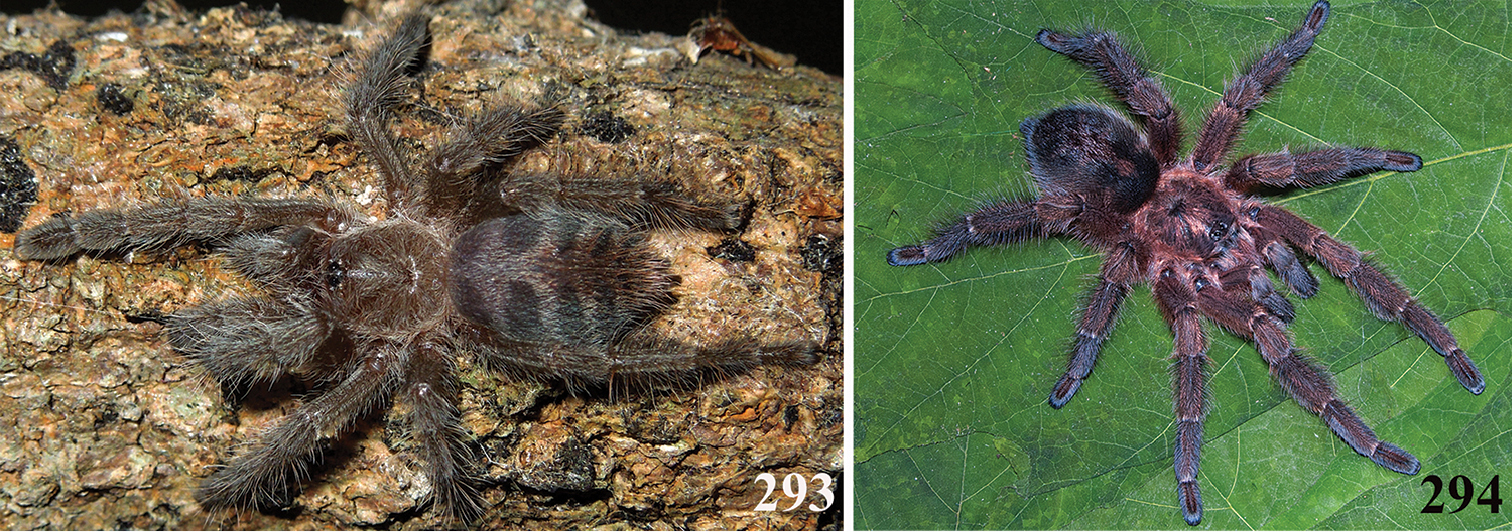

Conservation status
- Vulnerable (IUCN 3.1)

Scientific classification
- Kingdom: Animalia
- Phylum: Arthropoda
- Subphylum: Chelicerata
- Class: Arachnida
- Order: Araneae
- Infraorder: Mygalomorphae
- Family: Theraphosidae
- Genus: Antillena
- Species: A. rickwesti

Binomial name
- Antillena rickwesti (Bertani & Huff, 2013)

Synonyms
- Avicularia rickwesti Bertani & Huff, 2013

= Antillena rickwesti =

Species of spider

Antillena rickwesti is a species of spider belonging to the family Theraphosidae, the tarantulas. This species is endemic to the Dominican Republic.

== Taxonomy ==
Antillena rickwesti was first formally described in 2013 by Rogério Bertani and Jeremy Huff, as Avicularia rickwesti. Only the female was known. The specific name recognizes the contributions to the study of the family Theraphosidae by Rick C. West. At the time of description, it was noted that the species was "very distinct" from others in the genus Avicularia, but no alternative generic placement seemed better. A phylogenetic study published in 2017 suggested that the species was sufficiently distinct from Avicularia to be placed in a separate new genus, Antillena. A second species of Antillena spider, A. miguelangeli, was described in 2017, also from the Dominican Republic.

== Etymology ==
Antillena rickwesti is the type species of the genus Antillena, this name refers to the Antilles, where the species' only known locality, the Dominican Republic, is located. The specific name as an eponym, honoing the Canadian arachnologist Rick C. West for his contributions to te study of the taxonomy and biology of the spiders in the family Theraphosidae.

== Description ==
Antillena rickwesti was identified as a new species because it differed from other species in Avicularia the possessing two extremely short and broad spermathecae, each with a width approximately twice its length and a highly scleroticized outer half. The species also possesses spinelike setae on the leg coxae.

== Distribution ==
Antillena rickwesti is endemic to the Dominican Republic on Hispaniola. The holotype collected from Jaragua National Park in Pedernales Province, subsequently specimens have been collected from Independencia Province, Peravia Province, Azua Province and Barahona Province.
