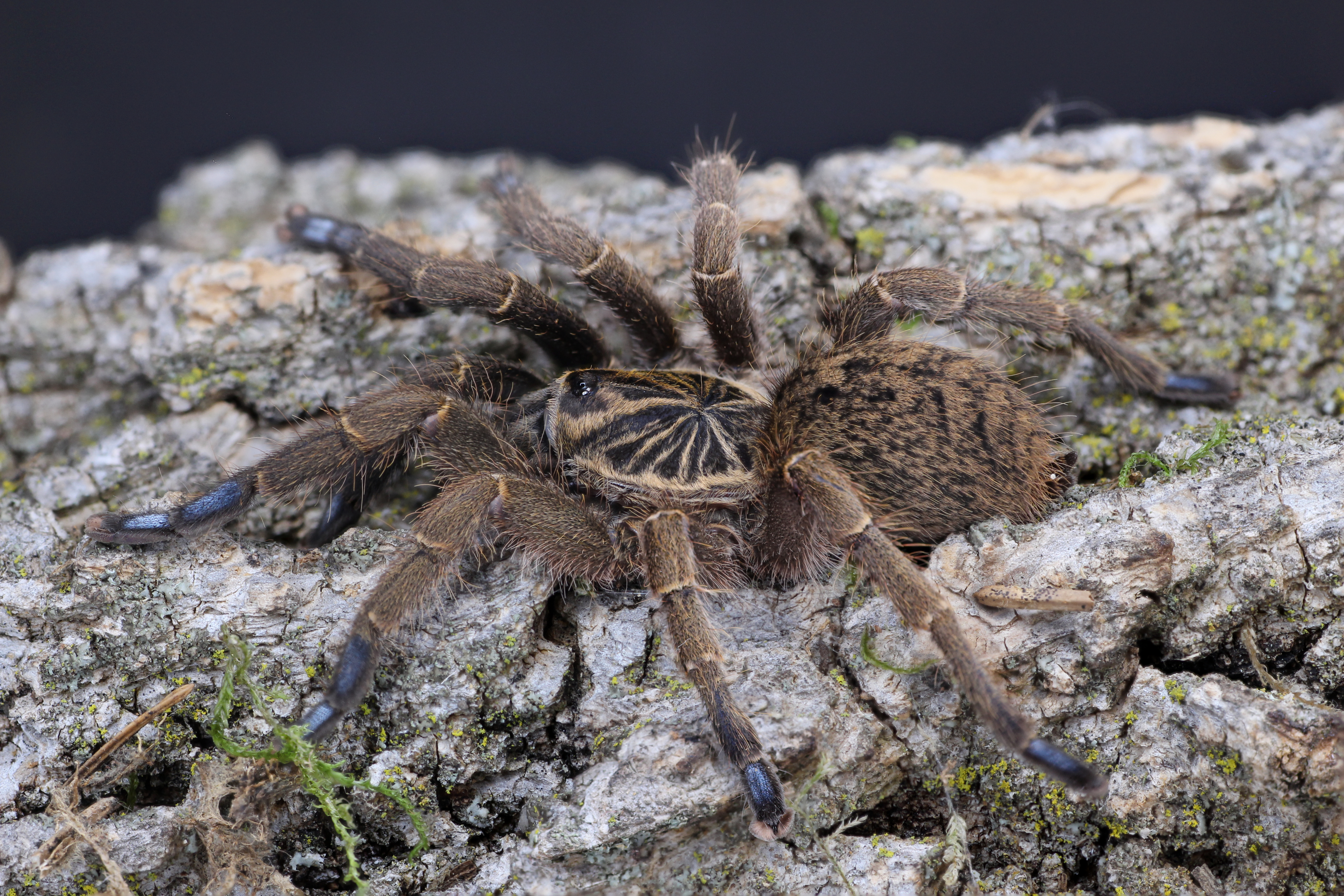
- Mature female
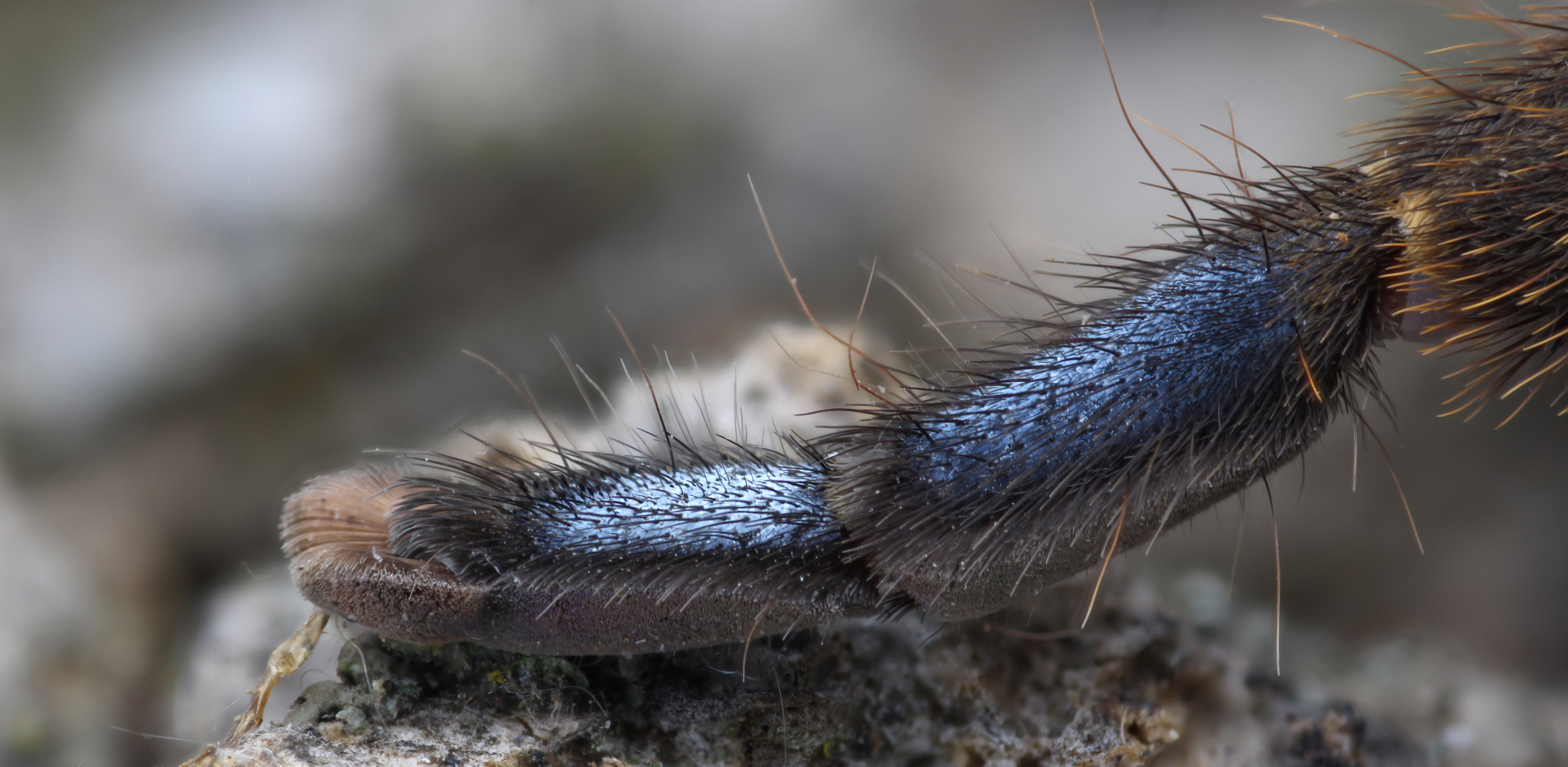
- Tarsus and metatarsus

Scientific classification
- Kingdom: Animalia
- Phylum: Arthropoda
- Subphylum: Chelicerata
- Class: Arachnida
- Order: Araneae
- Infraorder: Mygalomorphae
- Family: Theraphosidae
- Genus: Idiothele
- Species: I. mira

Binomial name
- Idiothele mira Gallon, 2010

= Idiothele mira =

Species of spider

Idiothele mira, also known as the blue-foot baboon is a species of fossorial tarantula endemic to South Africa. It has a striking blue coloration on the dorsal (upper) side of the tarsi and metatarsi on each leg. Furthermore, the species is well known for belonging to one of two described genera of theraphosids that build a trapdoor, the other being Typhochlaena. Its species epithet comes from the Latin for "wonderful", referring to the sky-blue coloration on the tarsi and metatarsi. This species is known from Ndumo and Tembe Elephant Game Reserves, South Africa.

== Taxonomy ==
I. mira was first described in 2010 by Richard C. Gallon. The holotype is stored in Pretoria.

== Description ==
Idiothele mira is a small species, with mature females reaching 4.5 inches in diagonal leg span. It is very reclusive, rarely leaving its burrow, usually only for mating purposes. This species is easily distinguished by its bright blue "toes" or tarsi and metatarsi. This readily distinguishes it from Idiothele nigrofulva. Recently moulted tarantulas of this species lack their namesake blue coloration, which develops soon after their molt. This coloration is caused by a farinaceous substance on their tarsi, instead of being caused by their setae. This beautiful coloration paired with a black and golden carapace, gold radiating within black in a "starburst" pattern, the abdomen is also golden with black speckling. Males have a smaller body size when compared to the leg span, and reach 3.5 inches on average.

== Ecology ==
This species construct dense silk linked tunnels beneath rocks or logs in lightly wooded habitats. The entrance to their burrow is usually sealed with a thin trapdoor made out of silk. Males mature in January and females produce a single hammock like egg sac which is suspended inside its tunnel. The eggsac of Idiothele mira commonly contains 25-45 spiderlings.
