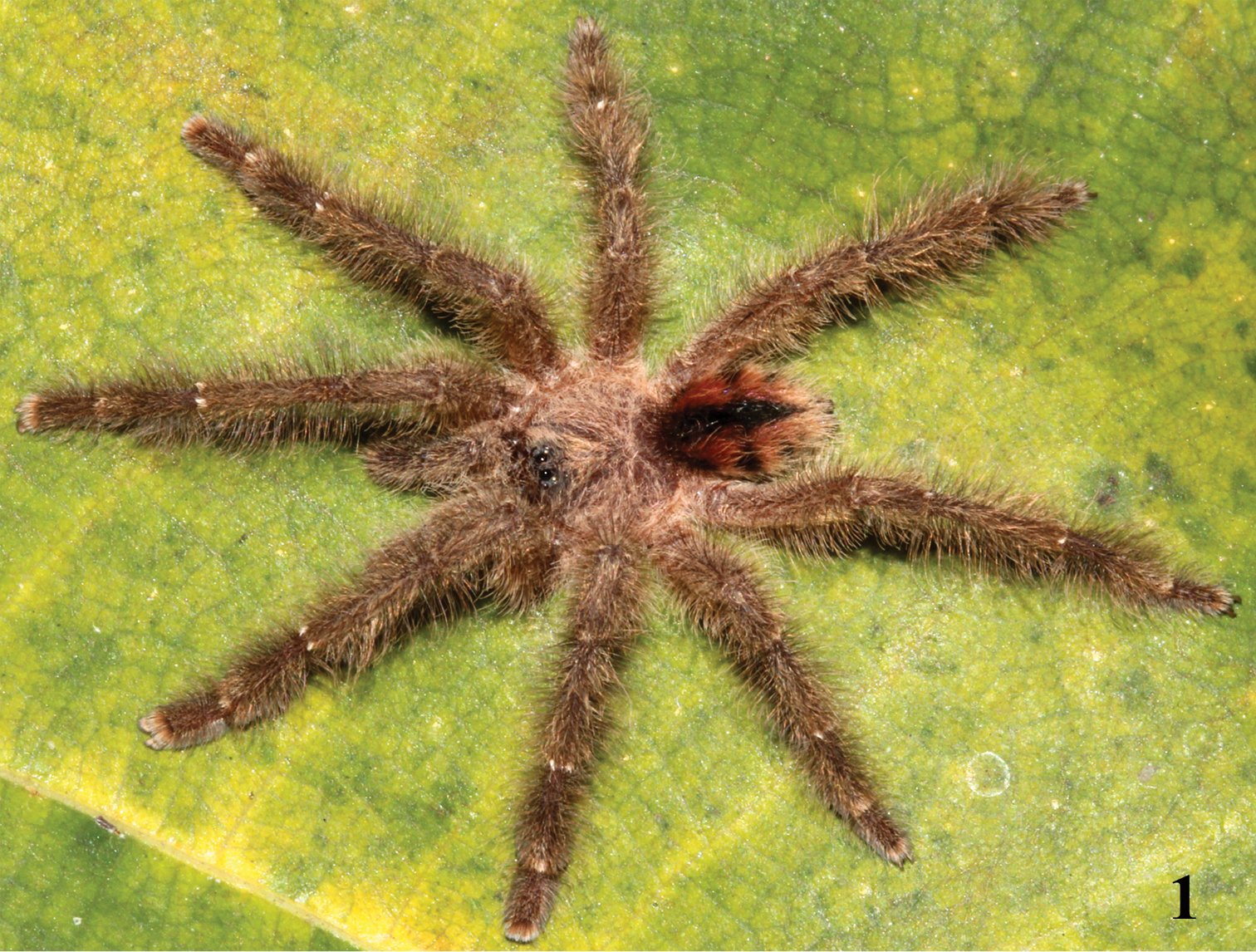

Scientific classification
- Kingdom: Animalia
- Phylum: Arthropoda
- Subphylum: Chelicerata
- Class: Arachnida
- Order: Araneae
- Infraorder: Mygalomorphae
- Family: Theraphosidae
- Genus: Typhochlaena
- Species: T. curumin

Binomial name
- Typhochlaena curumin Bertani, 2012
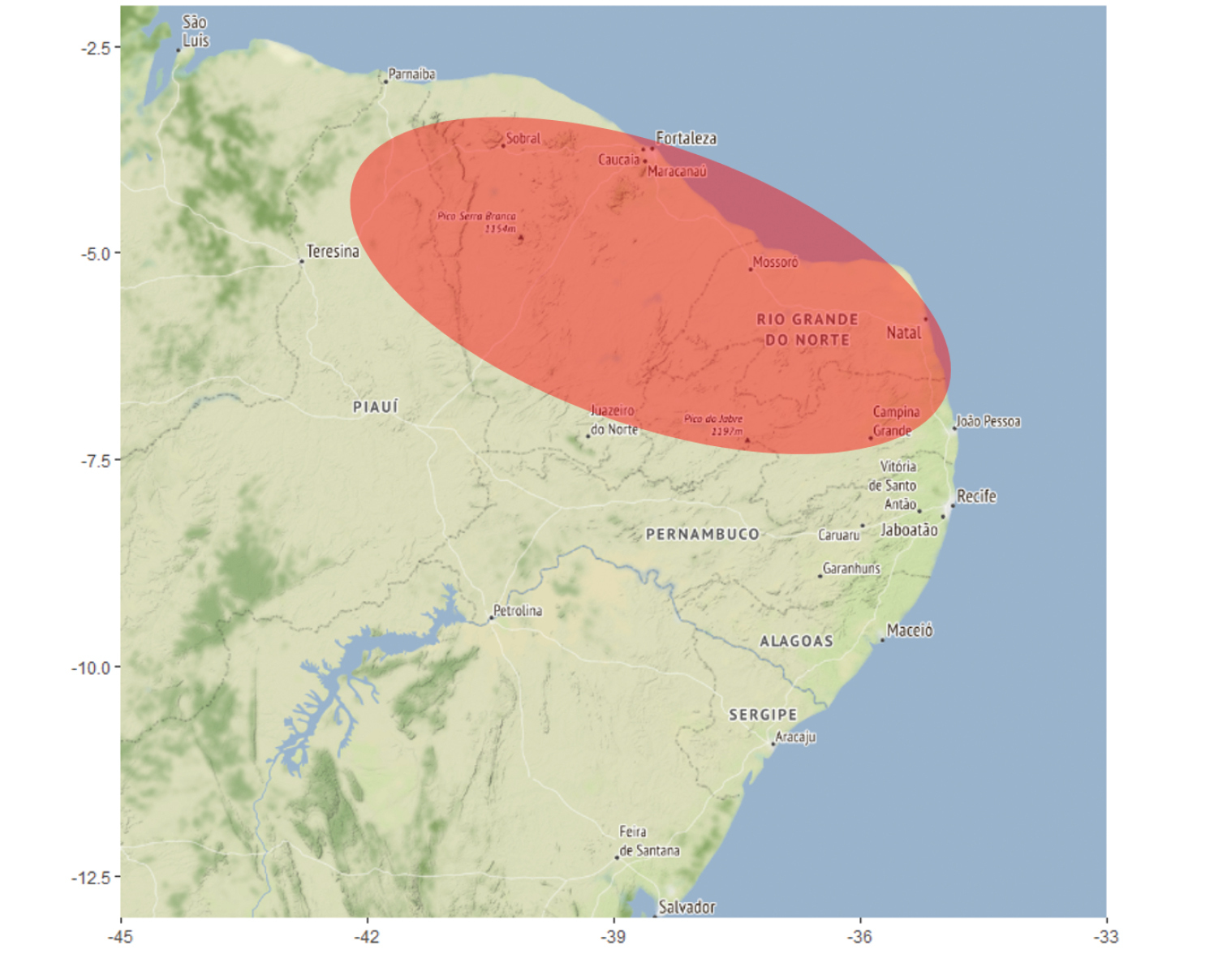

= Typhochlaena curumim =

Species of spider

Typhochlaena curumim is a species of tarantula, that is native to Mata do Pau-Ferro, Areia, in the state of Paraíba, Brazil. It is a member of the subfamily Aviculariinae.

== Etymology ==
The specific name is derived from the Brazilian indigenous Tupi language, meaning "child". It refers to the local children that found the type specimens high in a tree in Areia, State of Paraíba, Brazil, during an arachnological expedition.

== Characteristics ==
Typhochlaena curumim is only known from the female. It has a brown cephalothorax and legs, but the abdomen is metallic yellowish-green with a black dorsum with five black stripes extending laterally. It is characterized by the spermatheca, which is wide at the basal region but thins to a single or bifid spiralled region.
