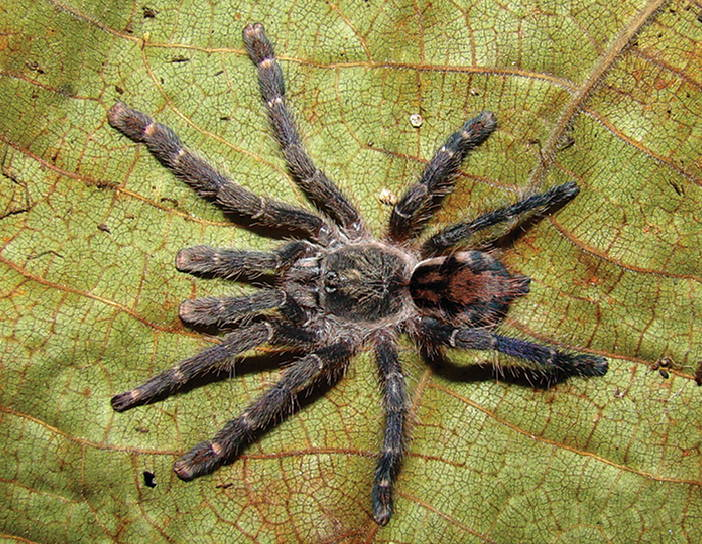
- Female
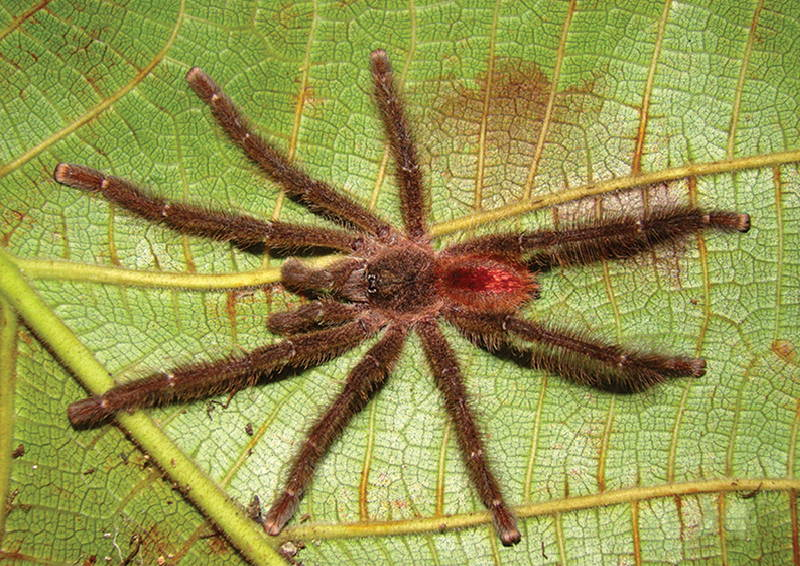
- Male

Scientific classification
- Kingdom: Animalia
- Phylum: Arthropoda
- Subphylum: Chelicerata
- Class: Arachnida
- Order: Araneae
- Infraorder: Mygalomorphae
- Family: Theraphosidae
- Genus: Ybyrapora
- Species: Y. gamba

Binomial name
- Ybyrapora gamba (Bertani & Fukushima, 2009)

Synonyms
- Avicularia gamba Bertani & Fukushima, 2009

= Ybyrapora gamba =

Species of spider

Ybyrapora gamba is a species of spider in the family Theraphosidae found in Brazil.
