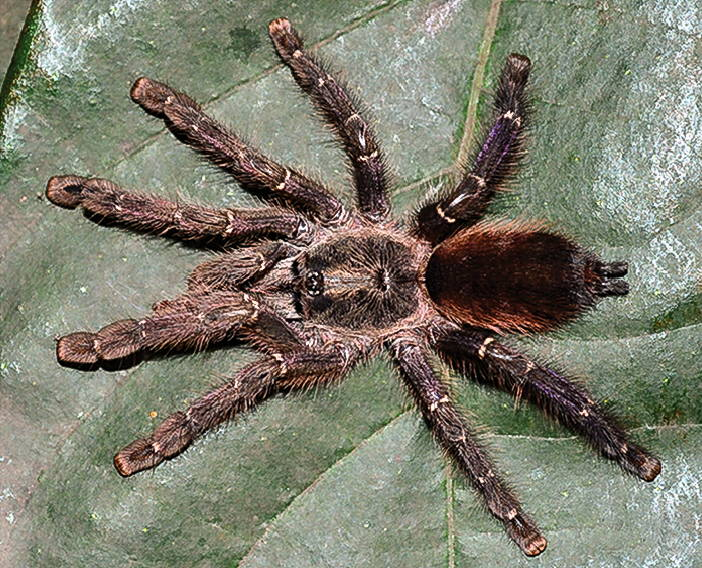
- Female

Scientific classification
- Kingdom: Animalia
- Phylum: Arthropoda
- Subphylum: Chelicerata
- Class: Arachnida
- Order: Araneae
- Infraorder: Mygalomorphae
- Family: Theraphosidae
- Genus: Ybyrapora
- Species: Y. sooretama

Binomial name
- Ybyrapora sooretama (Bertani & Fukushima, 2009)

Synonyms
- Avicularia sooretama Bertani & Fukushima, 2009

= Ybyrapora sooretama =

Species of spider

Ybyrapora sooretama is a species of spider in the family Theraphosidae, found in Brazil.

== Taxonomy ==
This species was described by Rogério Bertani and Caroline Sayuri Fukushima in 2009 as Avicularia sooretama. However, it was subsequently transferred into the genus Ybyrapora, making its currently accepted name Y. sooretama.
