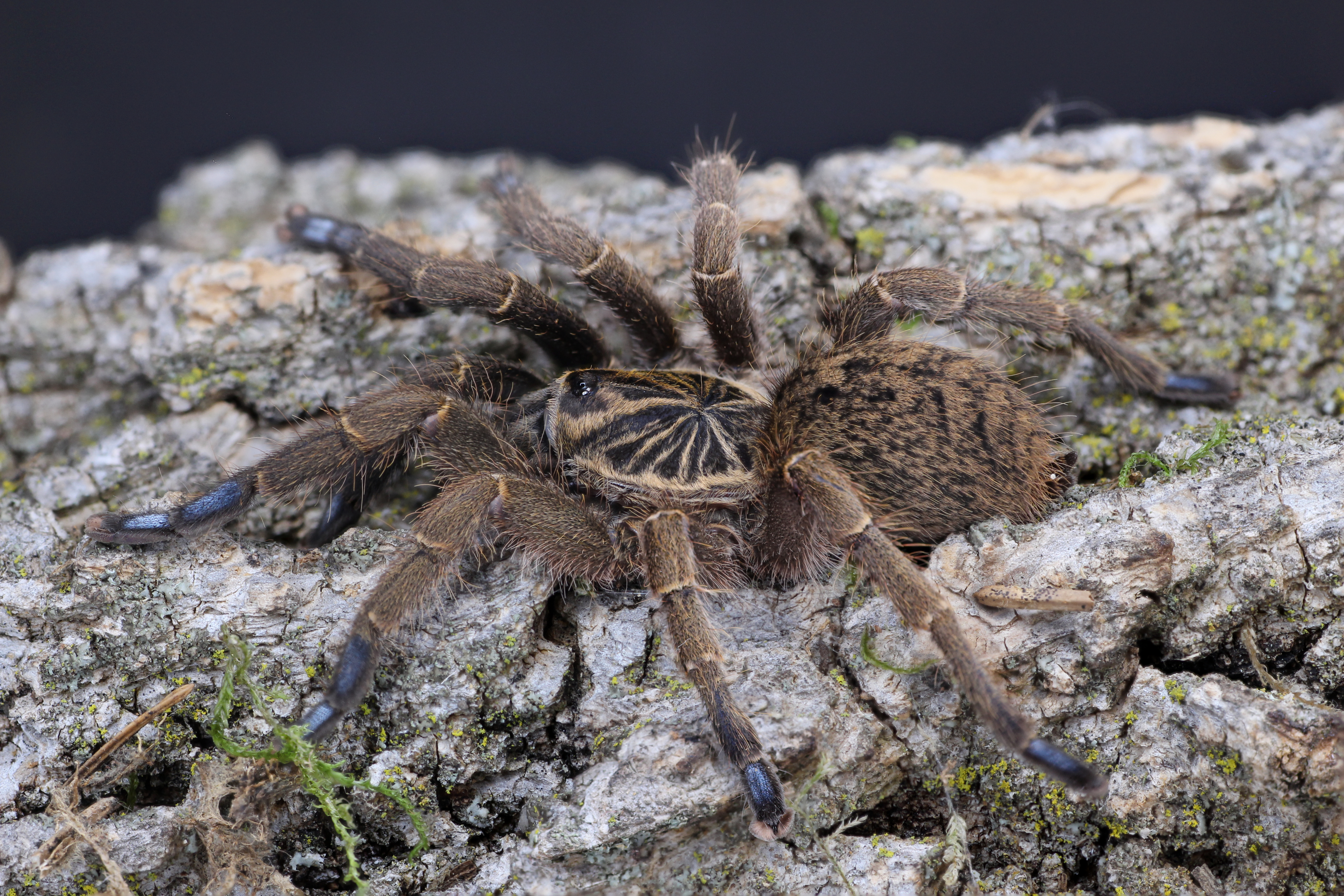
- Adult female Idiothele mira
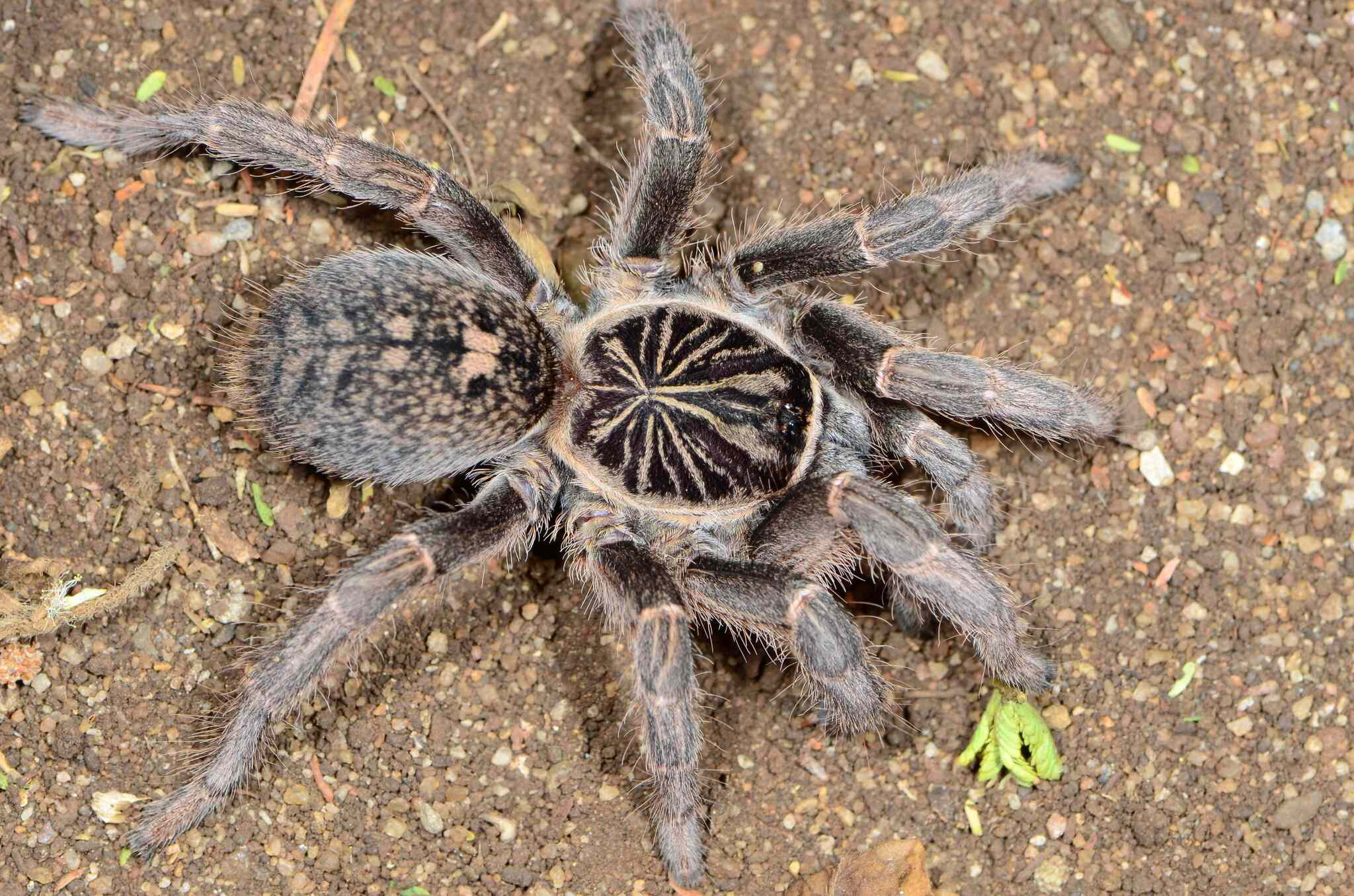
- Adult female Idiothele nigrofulva

Scientific classification
- Kingdom: Animalia
- Phylum: Arthropoda
- Subphylum: Chelicerata
- Class: Arachnida
- Order: Araneae
- Infraorder: Mygalomorphae
- Family: Theraphosidae
- Genus: Idiothele; Hewitt, 1919

Type species
- I. nigrofulva (Pocock, 1898)

Species
- I. mira Gallon, 2010; I. nigrofulva (Pocock, 1898)

= Idiothele =

Genus of spiders

Idiothele is a genus of African tarantulas that was first described by J. Hewitt in 1919. While originally described as their own genus, Idiothele was synonymized with Pterinochilus in 1985, due to similar morphological characteristics. This was later reversed by Richard C. Gallon in 2002, citing differences in both morphology and behavior.

Idiothele is the only genus of African tarantulas whose members make trap doors at the entrance of their burrow.

== Species ==
As of October 2025, this genus includes two species:

- Idiothele mira Gallon, 2010 – South Africa
- Idiothele nigrofulva (Pocock, 1898) – Namibia, Botswana, Zimbabwe, Mozambique, South Africa (type species)
