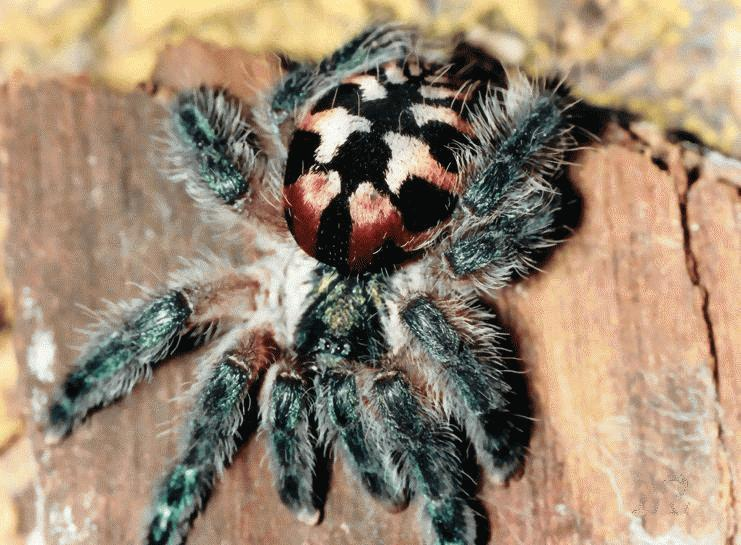
- Typhochlaena seladonia

Scientific classification
- Kingdom: Animalia
- Phylum: Arthropoda
- Subphylum: Chelicerata
- Class: Arachnida
- Order: Araneae
- Infraorder: Mygalomorphae
- Family: Theraphosidae
- Genus: Typhochlaena; C.L. Koch, 1850

= Typhochlaena =

Genus of spiders

Typhochlaena is a genus of small-bodied tarantulas with an arboreal trapdoor lifestyle. All the species except for T. seladonia were first described by Rogério Bertani in 2012.

== Characteristics ==
Typhochlaena differs from all other aviculariine species by having a domed, short distal segment on the posterior lateral spinneret; the sternum is as long as wide, truncated behind; they are also quite small, with type II urticating hairs.

== Species ==
As of January 2016, the World Spider Catalog accepted the following species:

- Typhochlaena amma Bertani, 2012 – Brazil
- Typhochlaena costae Bertani, 2012 – Brazil
- Typhochlaena curumim Bertani, 2012 – Brazil
- Typhochlaena paschoali Bertani, 2012 – Brazil
- Typhochlaena seladonia (C.L. Koch, 1841) (type species) – Brazil
