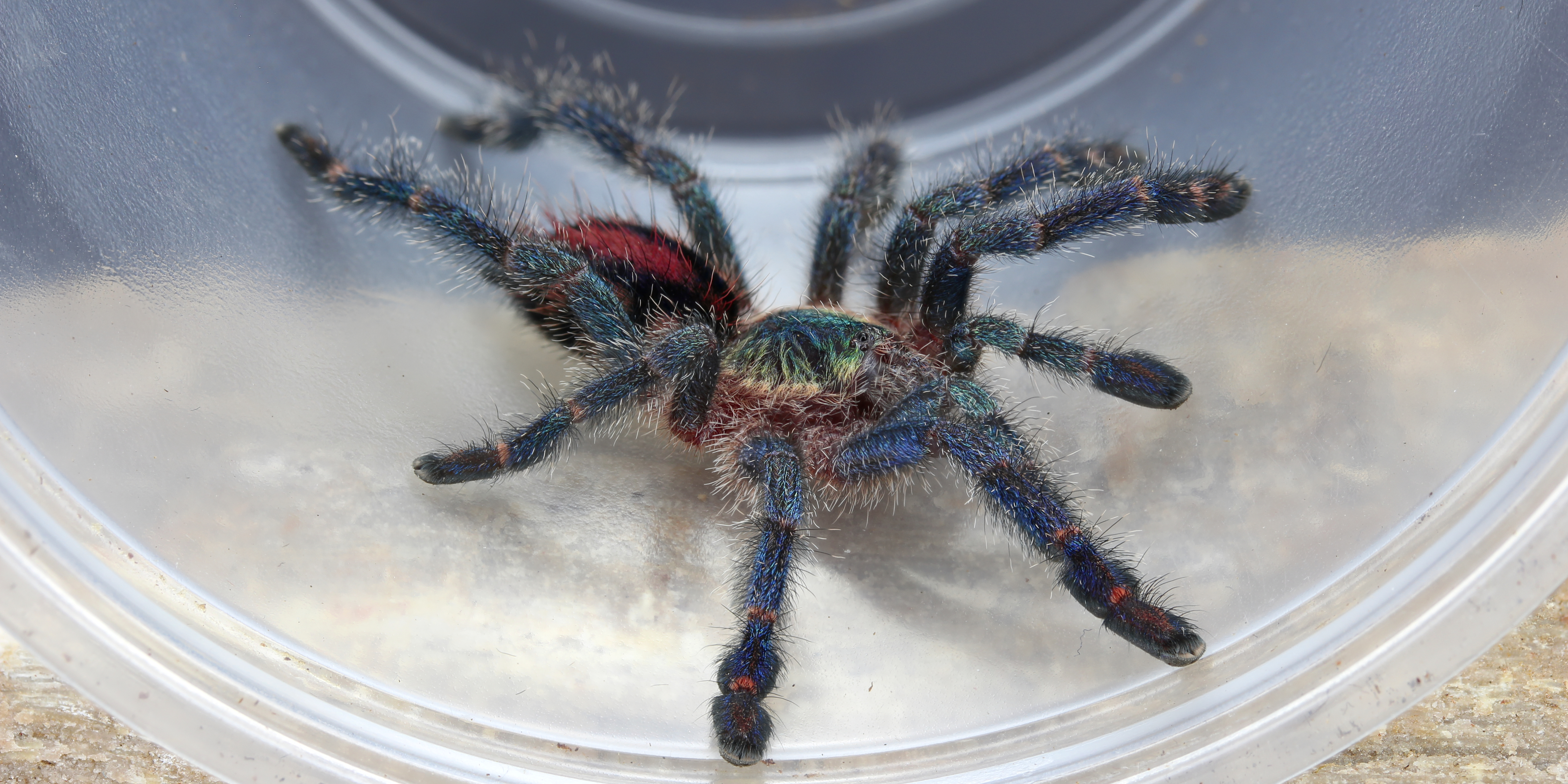
- Juvenile

Scientific classification
- Kingdom: Animalia
- Phylum: Arthropoda
- Subphylum: Chelicerata
- Class: Arachnida
- Order: Araneae
- Infraorder: Mygalomorphae
- Family: Theraphosidae
- Genus: Ybyrapora
- Species: Y. diversipes

Binomial name
- Ybyrapora diversipes (C.L. Koch, 1842)

Synonyms
- Mygale diversipes C.L. Koch, 1842; Eurypelma diversipes (C.L. Koch, 1842); Avicularia diversipes (C.L. Koch, 1842)

= Ybyrapora diversipes =

Species of spider

Ybyrapora diversipes is a species of spider in the family Theraphosidae found in Brazil.
