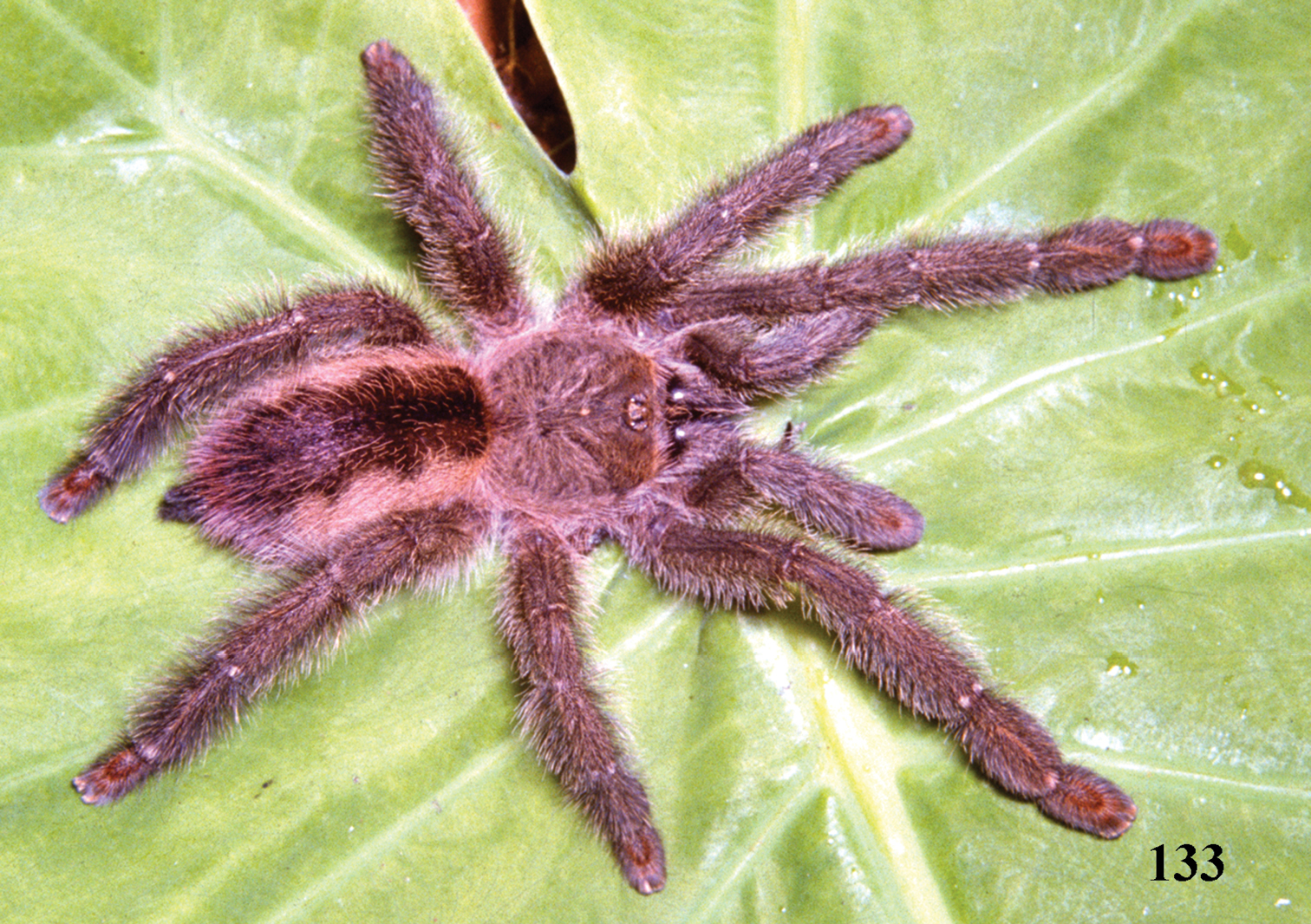
- Iridopelma vanini

Scientific classification
- Kingdom: Animalia
- Phylum: Arthropoda
- Subphylum: Chelicerata
- Class: Arachnida
- Order: Araneae
- Infraorder: Mygalomorphae
- Family: Theraphosidae
- Genus: Iridopelma; Pocock, 1901

Type species
- I. hirsutum Pocock, 1901

Species
- 6, see text

= Iridopelma =

Genus of spiders

Iridopelma is a genus of Brazilian tarantulas that was first described by Reginald Innes Pocock in 1901.

== Diagnosis ==
Males of this genus can be distinguished by the tibial spurs on leg 1 and 2, while females differ from most other genera by the anterior eye row, which is strongly curved forward. Avicularia and Typhochlaena both own the latter characteristics; however, Iridopelma can be distinguished from Avicularia by the spermatheca, which lacks a curvature, and from Typhochlaena by the spinnerets, which are finger-shaped.

== Species ==
As of March 2020 it contains six species, all found in Brazil:

- Iridopelma hirsutum Pocock, 1901 (type) – Brazil
- Iridopelma katiae Bertani, 2012 – Brazil
- Iridopelma marcoi Bertani, 2012 – Brazil
- Iridopelma oliveirai Bertani, 2012 – Brazil
- Iridopelma vanini Bertani, 2012 – Brazil
- Iridopelma zorodes (Mello-Leitão, 1926) – Brazil

=== In synonymy ===
- I. palmicola (Mello-Leitão, 1945) = Iridopelma hirsutum

=== Nomina dubia ===
- Iridopelma leporina (C. L. Koch, 1841) - Brazil
- Iridopelma plantaris (C. L. Koch, 1842) - Brazil

=== Transferred to other genera ===
- Iridopelma seladonium (C. L. Koch, 1841) → Typhochlaena seladonia
