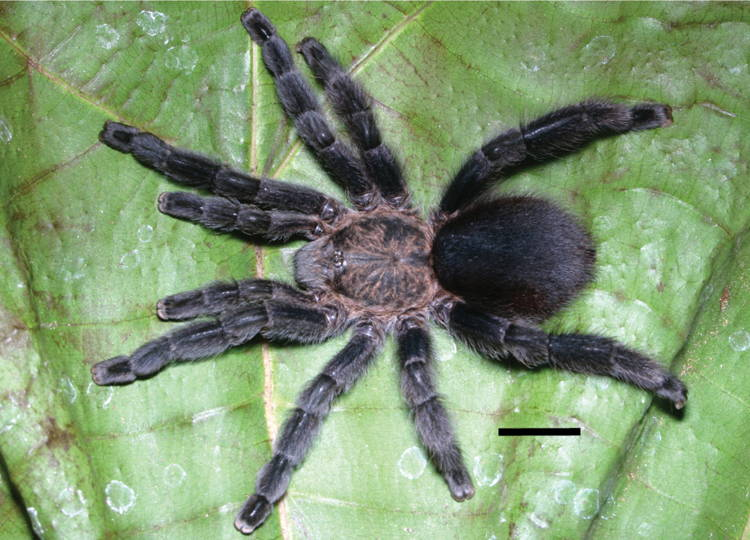

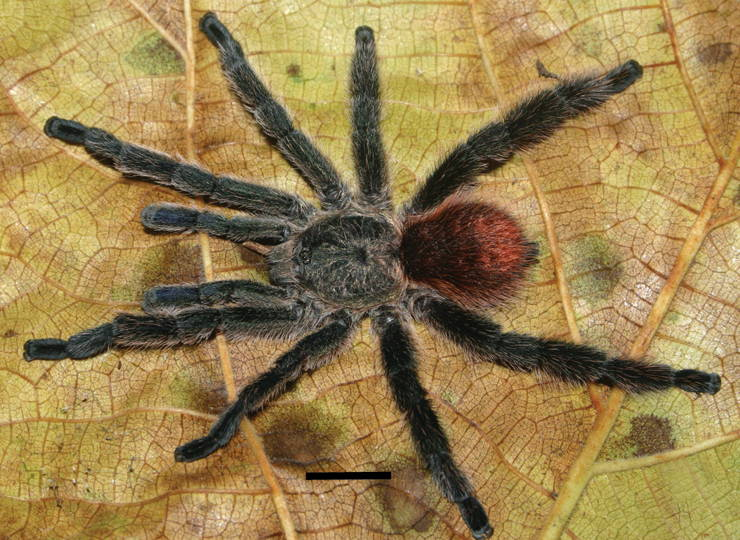
- Above – female, below – male; scale bar = 10 mm

Scientific classification
- Kingdom: Animalia
- Phylum: Arthropoda
- Subphylum: Chelicerata
- Class: Arachnida
- Order: Araneae
- Infraorder: Mygalomorphae
- Family: Theraphosidae
- Genus: Pachistopelma
- Species: P. bromelicola

Binomial name
- Pachistopelma bromelicola (Bertani, 2012)

= Pachistopelma bromelicola =

Species of spider

Pachistopelma bromelicola is a species of tarantula, contained within the Aviculariinae subfamily. It is endemic to Brazil.

== Etymology ==
This spider is most commonly found on bromeliads, "bromelicola" meaning "of bromeliads".

== Characteristic features ==
P. bromelicola males and females differ from others of its genus by having a thickened fourth metatarsus and having black leg colouration. The adult female is nearly completely black, apart from some brown setae on the abdomen. The adult male is also very black but the chelicerae, legs, and cephalothorax have whitish setae. Furthermore, the abdomen has long reddish setae, but shorter setae are black.

The younger spiders of this genus are much brighter in abdominal colouration, with a central longitudinal stripe of black and several other stripes of black meeting with the central stripe. The carapace is brown-black.
