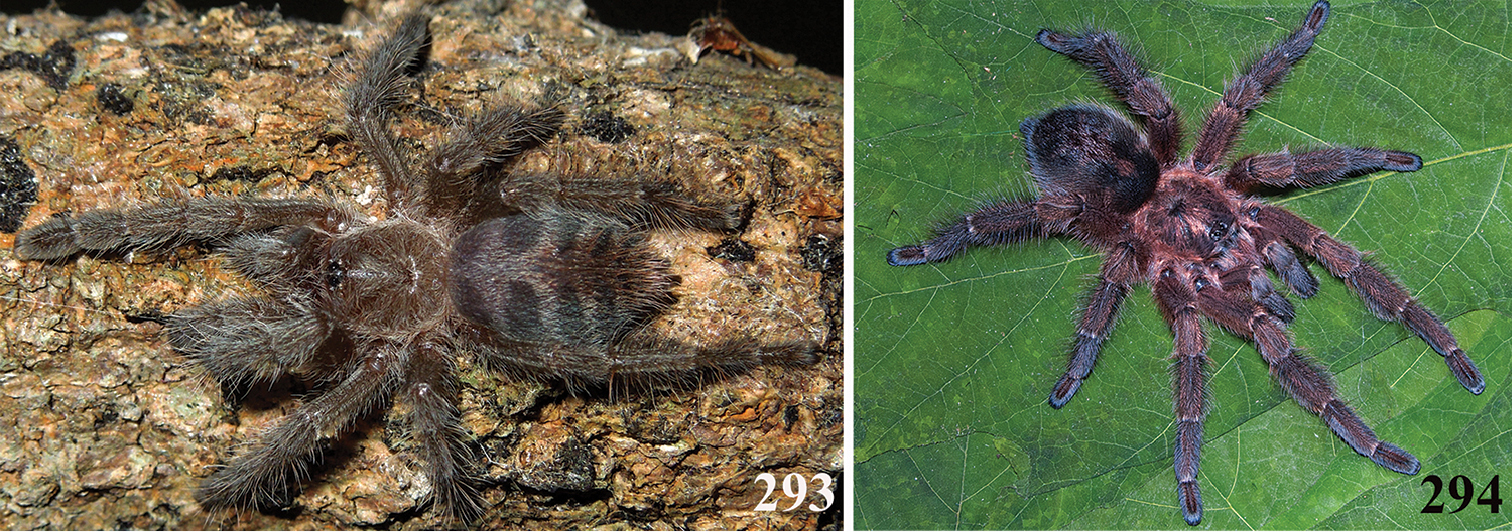
- Antillena rickwesti

Scientific classification
- Kingdom: Animalia
- Phylum: Arthropoda
- Subphylum: Chelicerata
- Class: Arachnida
- Order: Araneae
- Infraorder: Mygalomorphae
- Clade: Avicularioidea
- Family: Theraphosidae
- Genus: Antillena; Bertani, Hiff & Fukushima, 2017

Type species
- Avicularia rickwesti Bertani & Huff, 2013

= Antillena =

Genus of spiders

Antillena is a genus of spiders belonging to the family Theraphosidae, the tarantulas and related spiders. The species in this genus are endemic to the island of Hispaniola.

== Species ==
Antillena contains the following species:

- Antillena miguelangeli de los Santos & Bertani, 2024
- Antillena rickwesti (Bertrani & Huff, 2013)
