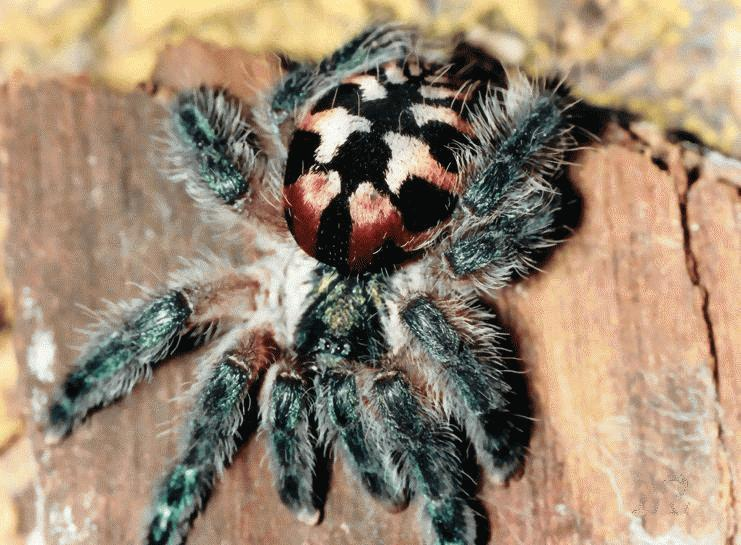
- Female

Scientific classification
- Kingdom: Animalia
- Phylum: Arthropoda
- Subphylum: Chelicerata
- Class: Arachnida
- Order: Araneae
- Infraorder: Mygalomorphae
- Family: Theraphosidae
- Genus: Typhochlaena
- Species: T. seladonia

Binomial name
- Typhochlaena seladonia Koch, 1841

= Typhochlaena seladonia =

Species of spider

Typhochlaena seladonia, known as the Brazilian jewel tarantula, is a New World tarantula that is endemic to the Atlantic Forest in northeastern Brazil. This species primarily inhabits the Brazilian states of Bahia and Sergipe. They are popular in the exotic pet trade due to their bright colors and unique arboreal trapdoor builds.

== Habitat ==
These spiders live in the humid rainforest of northeastern Brazil in crevices they find in tree bark. T. seladonia rely on their trapdoors to survive and remain hidden from predators. This species is arboreal, which means they inhabit trees throughout the forest, rather than the ground like other Theraphosidae tarantulas.

== Diet ==
In the wild, these tarantulas are opportunistic killers who catch small insects that land near the entrance to their trapdoors. Prey can be small flying insects, cockroaches, and other invertebrates.

In captivity, owners feed the spiders dependent upon their size. It is recommended that spiderlings are fed twice a week and 24-48 hours post-molt. Flightless fruit flies, flour beetles, and/or pre-killed crickets or cockroach nymphs are recommended. For juveniles, the recommended feeding frequency is every 7-10 days and 3-7 days post-molt. Medium crickets and dubia roaches are the recommended prey items. For adults, the recommended feeding frequency is 2-3 weeks as needed and 5-10 days post-molt. Large crickets and dubia roaches are recommended.

== Taxonomy ==
T. seladonia was originally described by Carl Ludwig Koch, in Brazil in 1841, as Mygale seladonia. It has since been placed in several genera. In 1850 Koch transferred the species to the genus Typhochlaena as Typhochlaena seladonia. Eugène Simon transferred it again to Avicularia seladonia. In 1928, Candido Mello-Leitão transferred the species back to Typhochlaena seladonia, but Andrew Smith in 1993 transferred it to Iridopelma seladonia. Lina Almeida-Silva corrected the species name to seladonium. Rogèrio Bertani finally restored the species to Typhochlaena in 2012.

== Characteristics ==
The female Typhochlaena seladonia has long, thin spermathecae, which are spiralled distally. The male has a very long embolus. Additionally, both genders have a greenish cephalothorax and a black dorsum with two row of six spots, the posterior pair being reddish and all others being yellowish.

These spiders are small. Adult males have body lengths ranging from 9.5–12.5 mm (0.37–0.49 in). Females can reach up to 21 mm (0.83 in).

== Laws and regulations ==
Keeping tarantulas as pets is a common practice. They are still kept and bred regularly in the US and Europe. However, according to the Lacey Act (18 U.S.C 42), "...any importation of injurious wildlife into the United States or its territories or possessions must be authorized under a permit issued by the U.S. Fish and Wildlife Service." Similarly, Brazil enacted its Environmental Crimes Law of 1999, which states "Whoever trades, puts up for sale, exports or acquires, keeps in captivity or in warehouses, uses or transports eggs, larva or species of the wildlife animals, native or on migratory routes, as well as products or objects derived from it, from a non-authorized breeding area or without the appropriate permission, license or authorization from the competent authority."
