= Ophthalmia nodosa =

- Specialty: Dermatology

Ophthalmia nodosa is a cutaneous condition characterized by inflammation of the eye due to lodging of (for example) caterpillar hairs in the conjunctiva, cornea, or iris.

== See also ==
- Bristleworm sting
- List of cutaneous conditions
