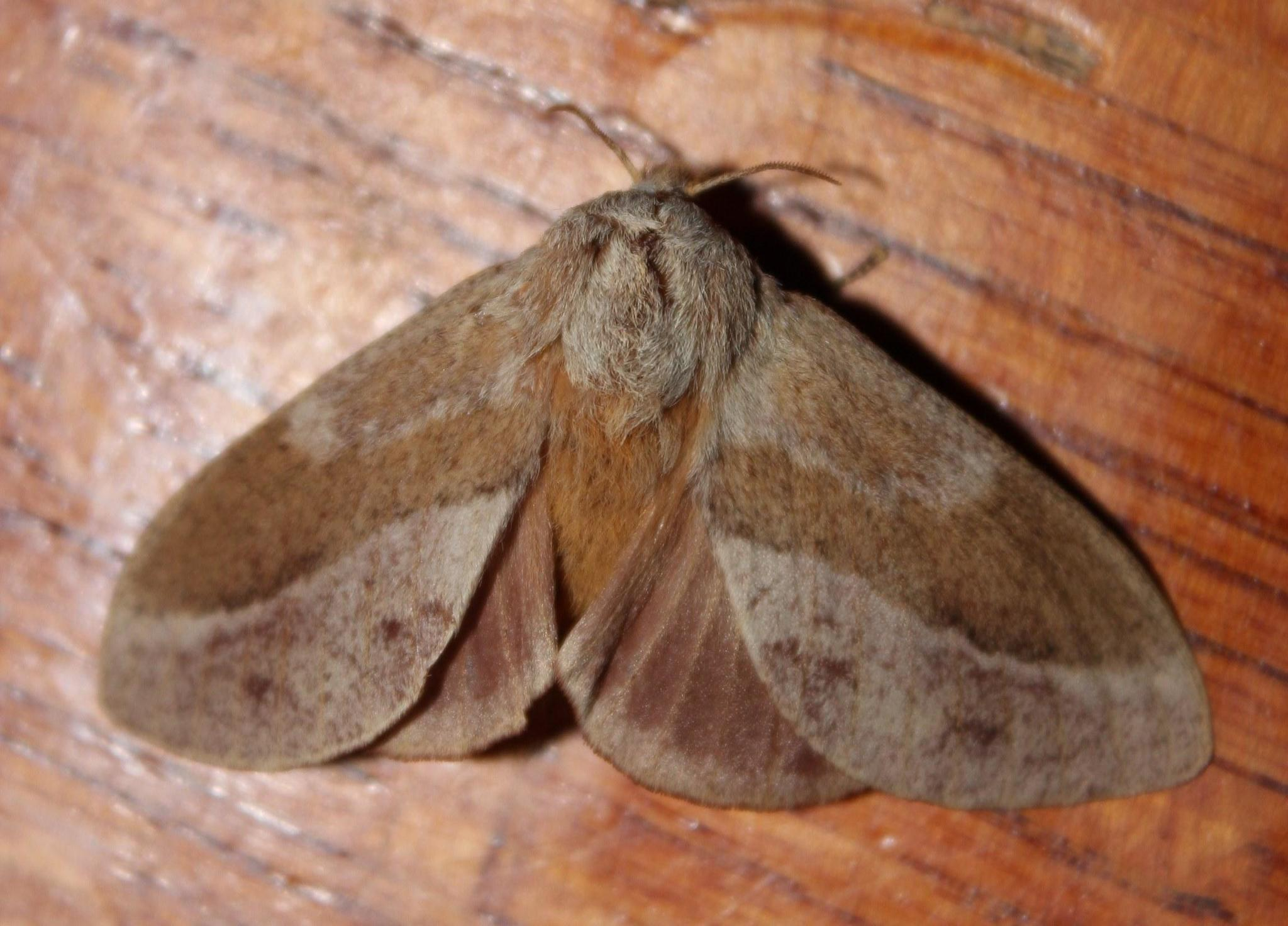

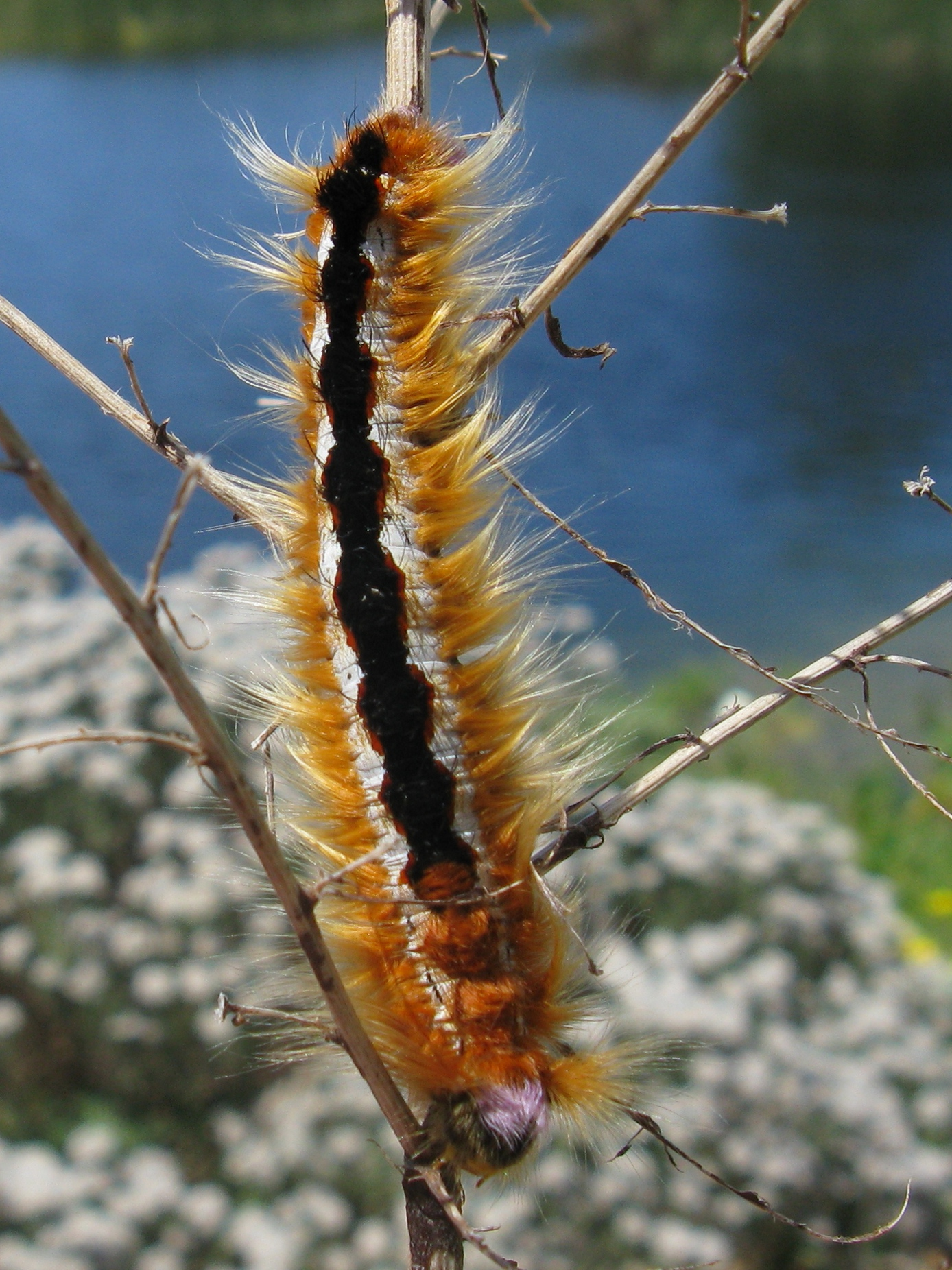
- Adult (top), larva (bottom)

Scientific classification
- Kingdom: Animalia
- Phylum: Arthropoda
- Class: Insecta
- Order: Lepidoptera
- Family: Lasiocampidae
- Genus: Dendrolimus
- Species: E. capensis

Binomial name
- Eutricha capensis (Linnaeus, 1767)

Synonyms
- Phalaena capensis Linnaeus 1767; Pachypasa obscura Walker 1855; Phalaena pithyocampa Stoll 1780; Eutricha aluco (Fabricius, 1781); Eutricha pithyocampa (Stoll, 1781); ?Eutricha bifascia Walker 1855

= Eutricha capensis =

Species of moth

Eutricha capensis, the Cape lappet moth, is a species of moth in the family Lasiocampidae primarily found in South Africa. During the larval stage, Cape lappets feed on a wide variety of African plants and can often be found aggregating in gardens. The caterpillars are brightly coloured and conspicuously hairy, while the bulky adult moths are mostly brown and much less striking in appearance.

== Description ==
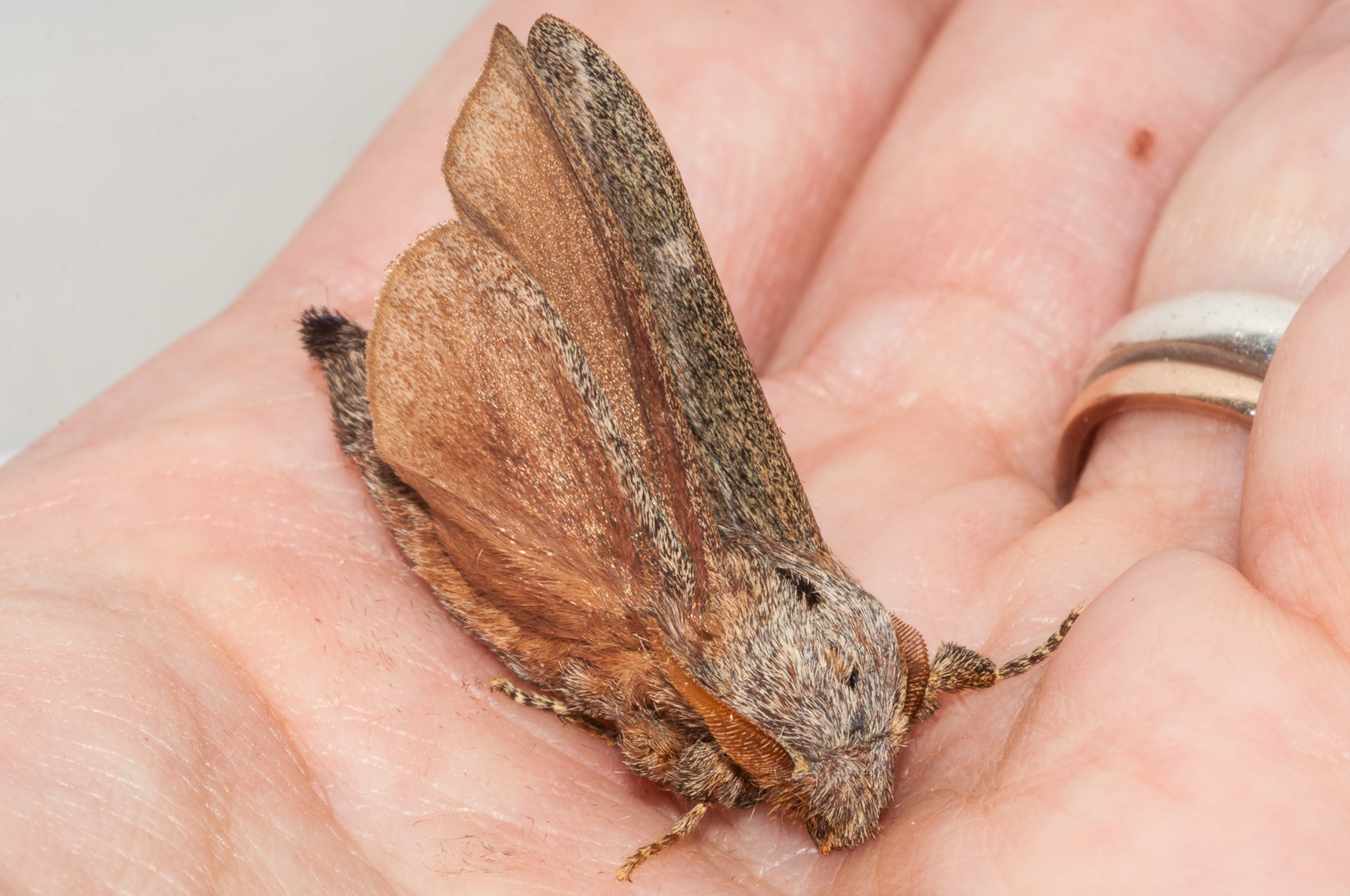

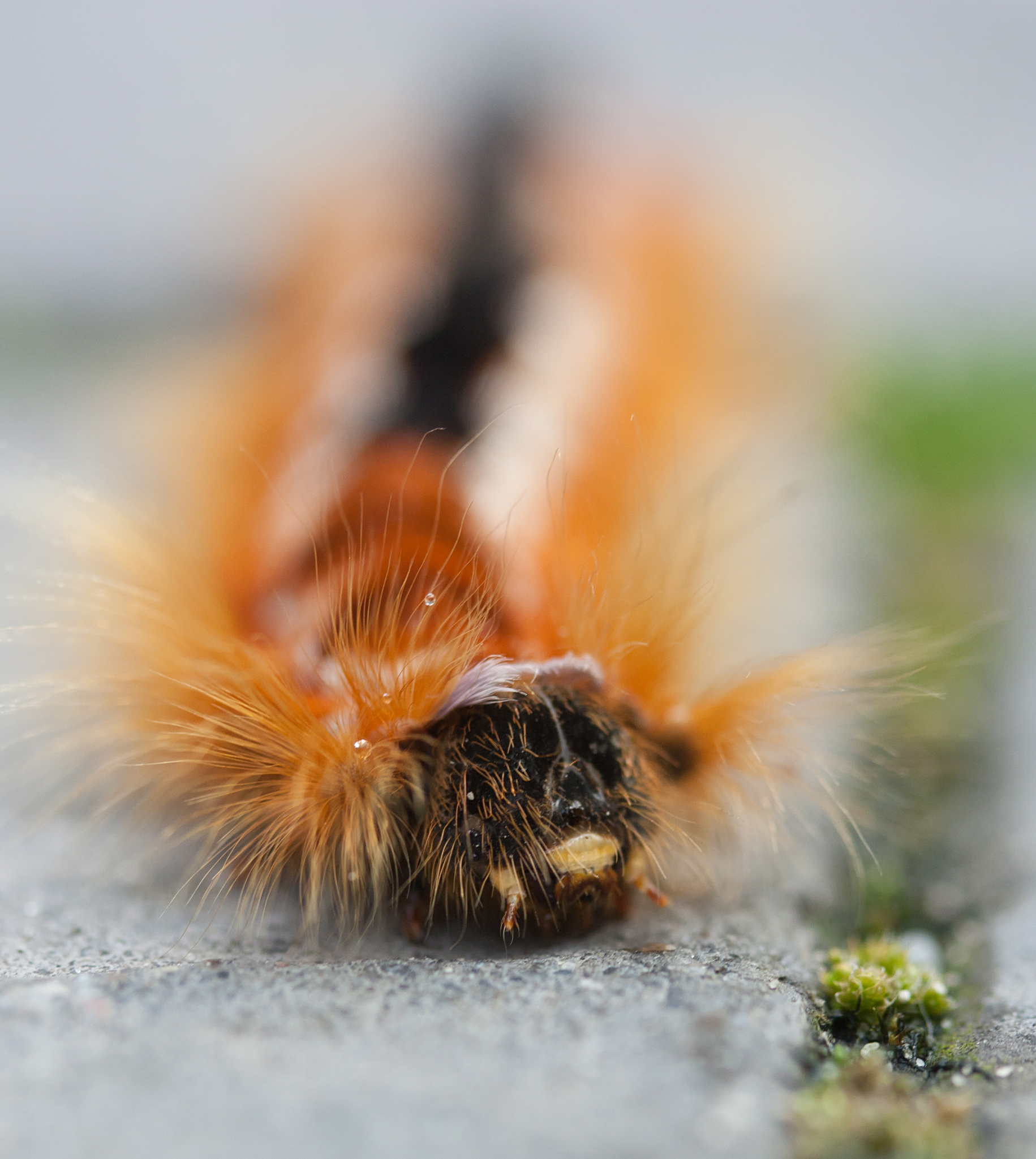
Head of Cape lappet caterpillar

The adults are large and stocky, with an average wingspan of about 70 mm (2.8 in). Both hind wings and fore wings are reddish brown. The fore wings are flecked with yellow and bear three wavy white stripes. Females are typically paler in colour and larger than males. Adult moths lack developed mouthparts and therefore do not feed. The antennae of females are deeply pectinate and are the length of the thorax.

The larvae are distinctly hairy with rows of orange tufts of long hair along the sides of the body. Arranged at the head are three large coppery tufts and two smaller purple tufts. Along the dorsal side of the caterpillars is a row of black triangles flanked either side by white.

== Distribution and habitat ==
There is little agreement regarding the extent of the Cape lappet moth's range in southern Africa. While all sources agree that its primary geographical home is South Africa, varied sources also state Malawi, Mozambique, and Tanzania. Being able to feed on a wide variety of plants, the caterpillars are common in domestic gardens and also in more remote and wild areas.

== Behaviour and life cycle ==
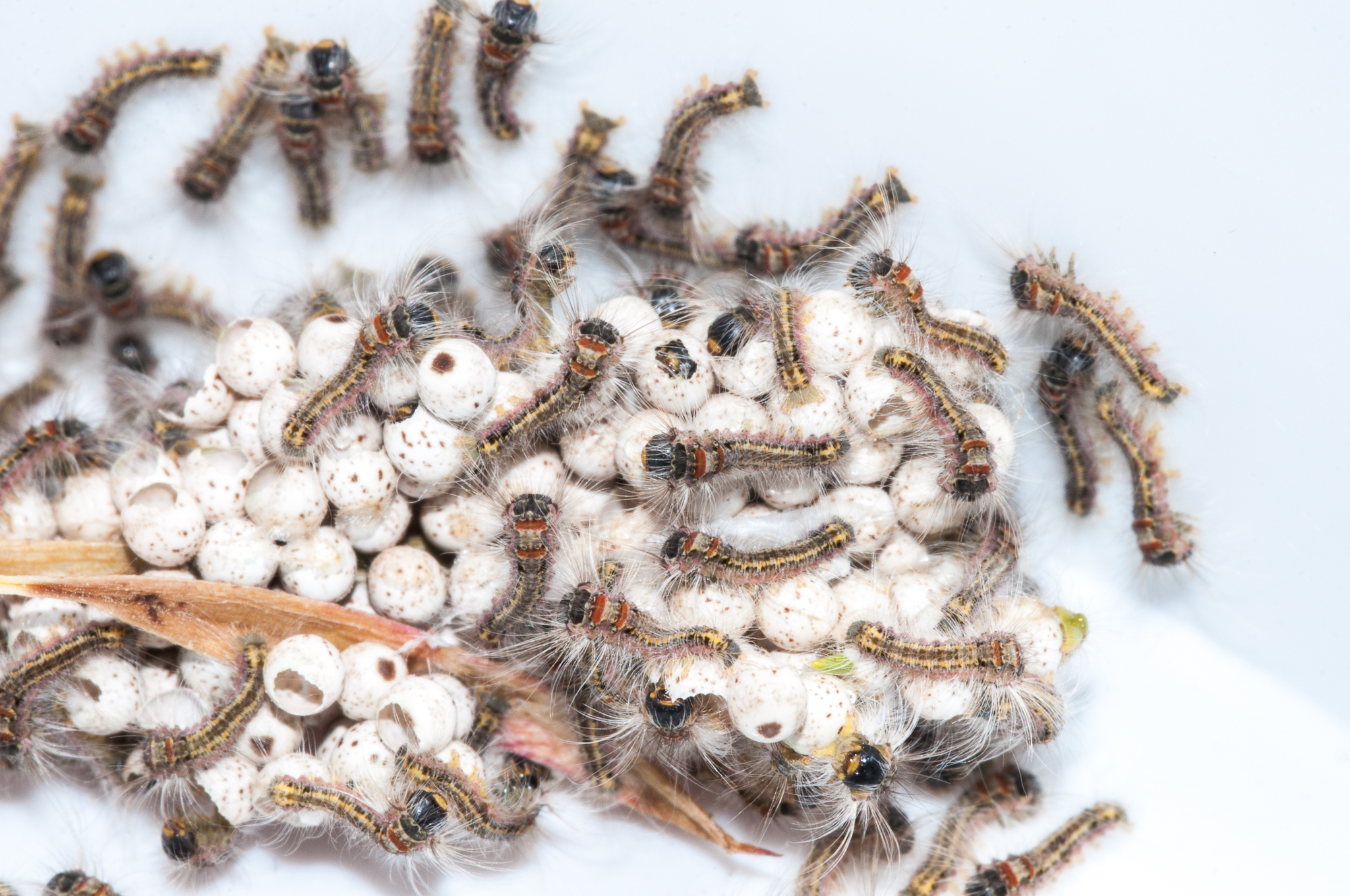

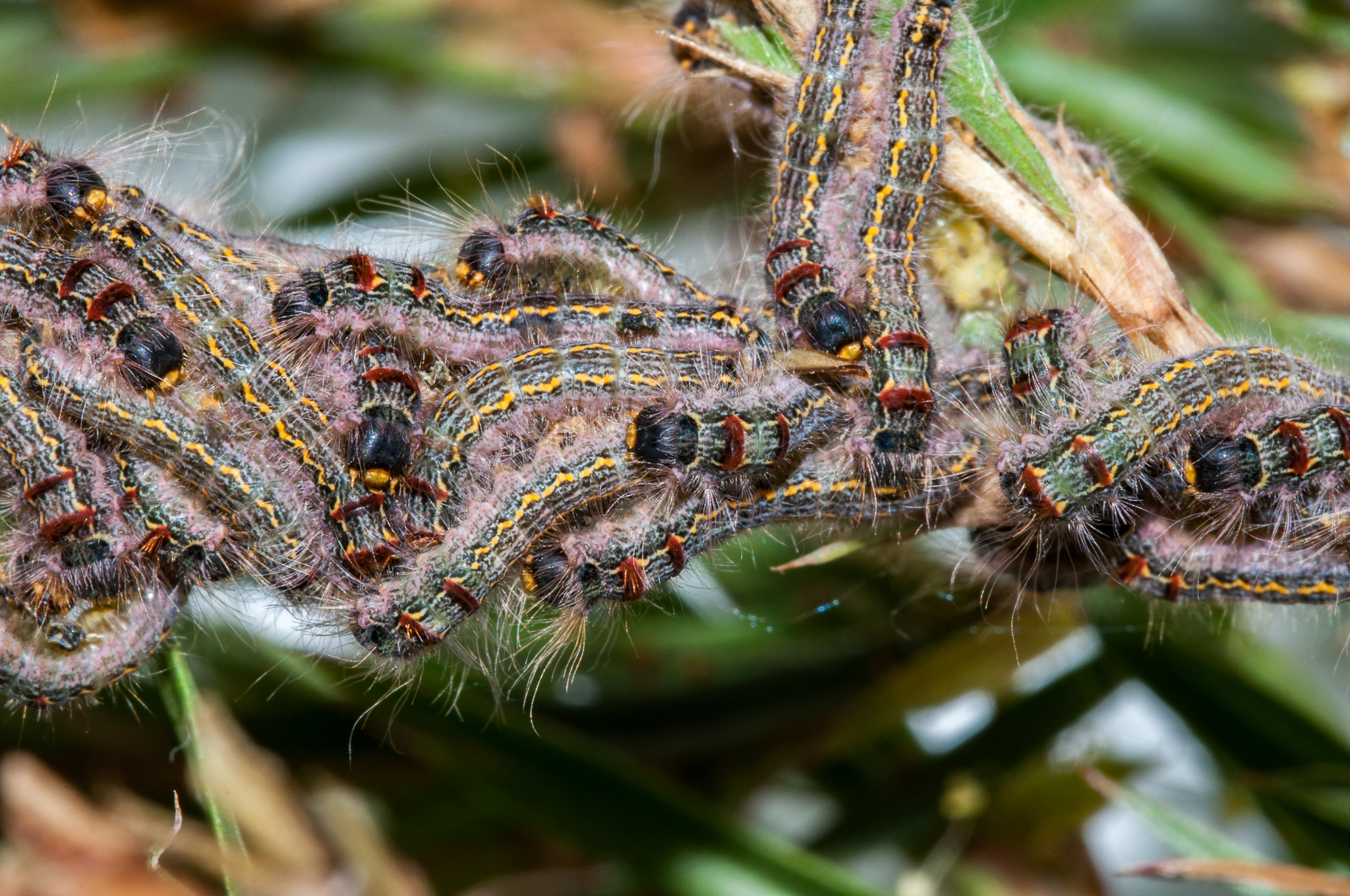
E. capensis caterpillars on a Cliffortia twig.

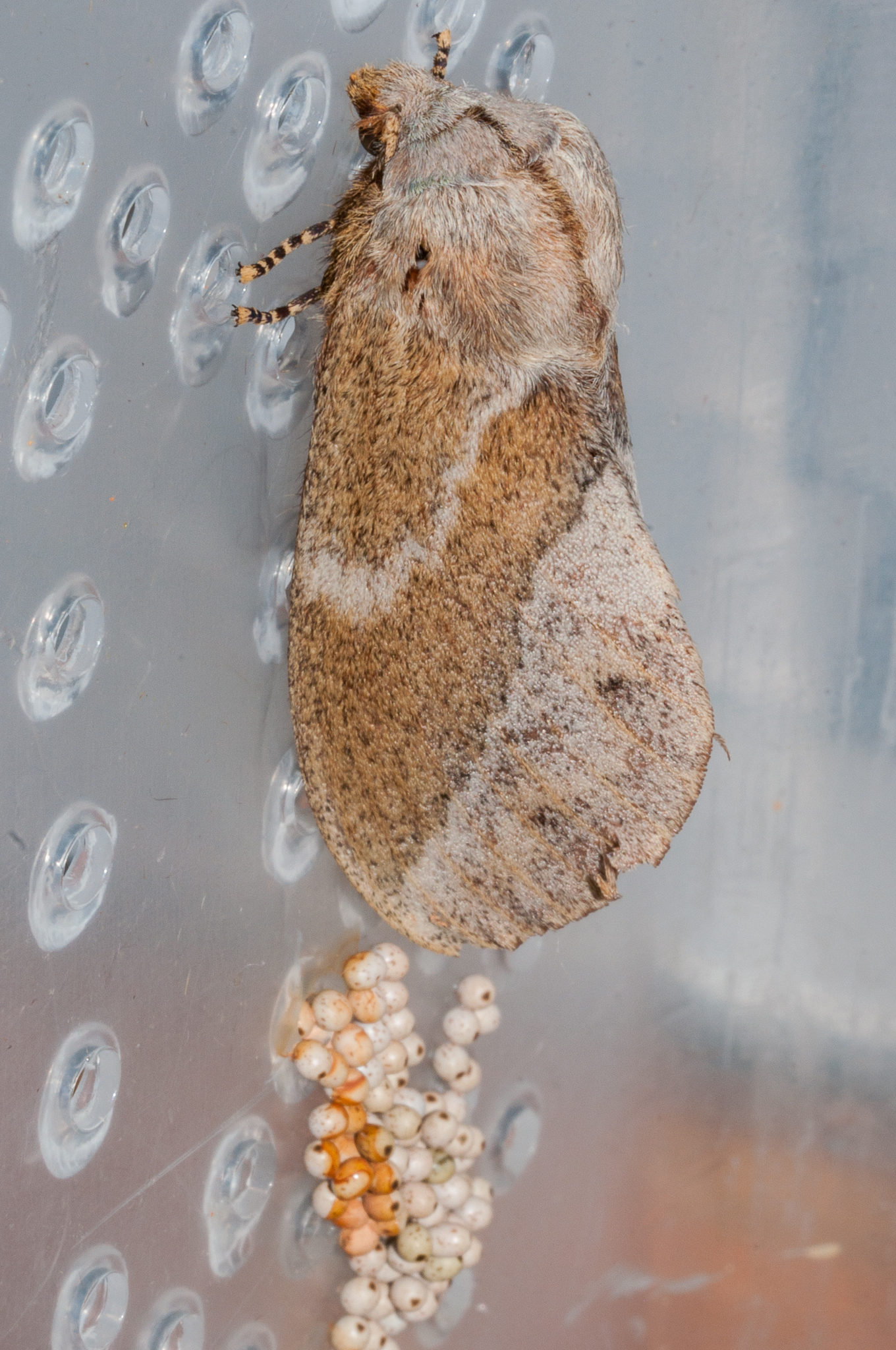

Gregarious as larvae, the caterpillars clump together in numbers. The reason for this behaviour is not well understood, with several proposed theories. For E. capensis at least, aggregating behaviour appears to be of no benefit to the caterpillars in terms of either water or energy conservation, according to a 2013 study.

The larvae feed on Acacia cyclops, A. mearnsii, A. saligna, A. karroo, Bauhinia, Celtis africana, Chrysanthemoides monilifera, C. incana, Cupressus macrocarpa, Combretum molle, Eucalyptus macarthurii, E. paniculata, Euclea racemosa, Mangifera indica, Pinus patula, P. radiata, P. elliottii, P. montezumae, Populus, Prunus armeniaca, P. persica, Rhus lancea, Searsia lucida, Rhus crenata, Schinus molle, S. terebinthifolius, Rosa banksiae and Taxodium distichum.

The emergence of the adults occurs in early summer. When disturbed, adults are non-aggressive.

== Taxonomy ==
The Cape lappet moth was first described in 1767 by Carl Linnaeus in the first volume of his 12th edition of Systema Naturae. As with the majority of moths that Linnaeus described, he placed E. capensis in the now obsolete genus Phalaena. The specific epithet he chose, capensis, presumably refers to the moth's distribution in the Western Cape of South Africa.
