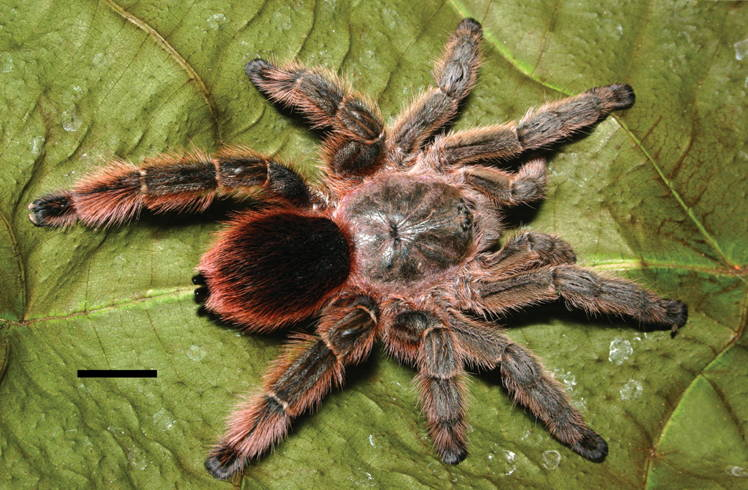
- Female Pachistopelma rufonigrum in habitat; scale bar = 10 millimetres (0.39 in)

Scientific classification
- Kingdom: Animalia
- Phylum: Arthropoda
- Subphylum: Chelicerata
- Class: Arachnida
- Order: Araneae
- Infraorder: Mygalomorphae
- Family: Theraphosidae
- Genus: Pachistopelma; Pocock, 1901

Type species
- P. rufonigrum Pocock, 1901

Species
- P. bromelicola Bertani, 2012 – Brazil; P. rufonigrum Pocock, 1901 – Brazil

= Pachistopelma =

Genus of spiders

Pachistopelma is a genus of Brazilian tarantulas that was first described by Reginald Innes Pocock in 1901. As of May 2020 it contains two species, found in Brazil: P. bromelicola and P. rufonigrum. They have a straight front eye row and males have a spinose spur on the first tibia. Females have two spermathecae lacking lobes or constrictions that have a slight curvature in the middle.

== See also ==
- List of Theraphosidae species
