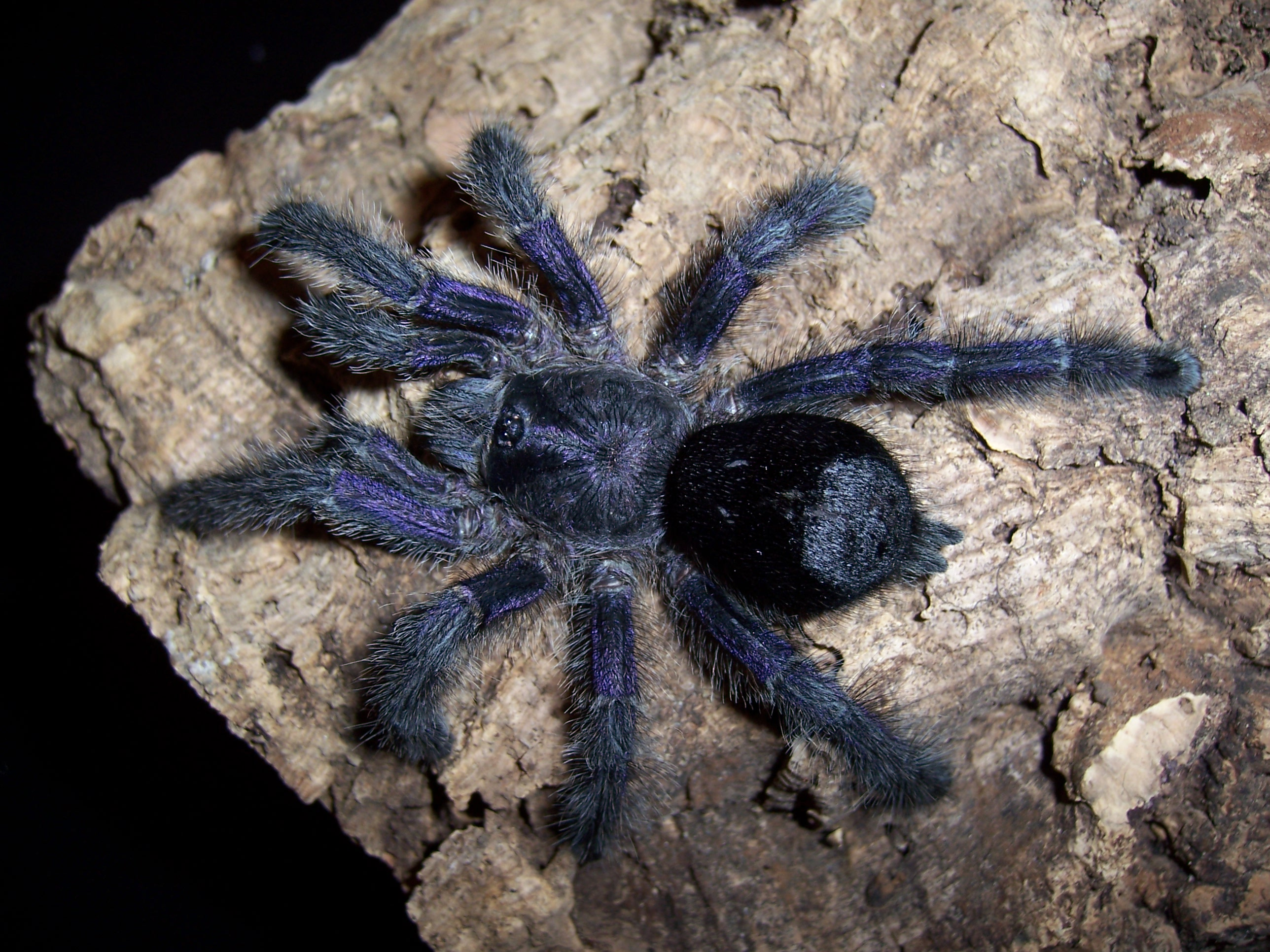
- Avicularia purpurea

Scientific classification
- Kingdom: Animalia
- Phylum: Arthropoda
- Subphylum: Chelicerata
- Class: Arachnida
- Order: Araneae
- Infraorder: Mygalomorphae
- Family: Theraphosidae
- Subfamily: Aviculariinae; Simon, 1889

Genera
- See text.

= Aviculariinae =

Subfamily of tarantulas

The Aviculariinae are a subfamily of spiders in the family Theraphosidae (tarantulas). They can be distinguished from other theraphosids by a number of characters. Their legs have no or few spines on the underside (ventral surface) of the tibial and metatarsal joints of the legs. The last two leg joints (the metatarsi and tarsi) have brushes of hairs (scopulae) that extend sideways, particularly on the front legs, giving them a spoon-like (spatulate) appearance. Females have two completely separated spermathecae.

== Taxonomy ==
The earliest classification of the mygalomorph spiders to include sufficient genera to be reasonably comprehensive was that of Eugène Simon in 1892. He recognized only two mygalomorph families; his Avicularidae taxon includes at least 12 modern families. The earliest equivalent to the modern subfamily Aviculariinae is considered to be Simon's 1889 tribe Aviculariae, which included three genera: Avicularia, Tapinauchenius and Scodra (now Stromatopelma).

The circumscription of the subfamily has varied considerably. Both the limits of the subfamily and the limits of its genera have been controversial. In his 1985 monograph on the Mygalomorphae, Robert Raven included only four genera, Avicularia, Iridopelma, Pachistopelma, and Tapinauchenius. Günter Schmidt in 2003 included Iridopelma in Avicularia, but added Ephebopus and Psalmopoeus to the subfamily. Authors from 2008 onwards have included a wider range of genera, sometimes newly recognized ones.

A 2017 morphological phylogenetic study provided evidence that the subfamily is monophyletic. The authors' preferred hypothesis for the relationships within the Aviculariinae is shown below, based on the species from each genus included in the study.

- Aviculariinae
  - - - - Psalmopoeus
        - Tapinauchenius
      - Ephebopus
    - - - Stromatopelma
        - Heteroscodra
      - - Typhochlaena
        - - Avicularia
          - - Antillena
            - - - Caribena
                - - Iridopelma marcoi
                  - Pachistopelma
              - - Ybyrapora
                - Iridopelma

== Genera ==
A 2017 monograph included the following genera, three newly erected:

- Antillena Fukushima & Bertani, 2017
- Avicularia Lamarck, 1818
- Caribena Fukushima & Bertani, 2017
- Ephebopus Simon, 1892
- Heteroscodra Pocock, 1899
- Iridopelma Pocock, 1901
- Pachistopelma Pocock, 1901
- Psalmopoeus Pocock, 1895
- Stromatopelma Karsch, 1881
- Tapinauchenius Ausserer, 1871
- Typhochlaena C.L. Koch, 1850
- Ybyrapora Fukushima & Bertani, 2017
