= Rogério Bertani =

Brazilian zoologist

Rogério Bertani is a Brazilian arachnologist, active at the Butantan Institute.

He is credited as one of the foremost specialists in Theraphosidae in the world. He has described several species.
