= Ischnocolinae =

Scientific classification
- Kingdom: Animalia
- Phylum: Arthropoda
- Subphylum: Chelicerata
- Class: Arachnida
- Order: Araneae
- Infraorder: Mygalomorphae
- Family: Theraphosidae
- Subfamily: Ischnocolinae; Simon, 1892

Genera
- See text.

Subfamily of tarantulas

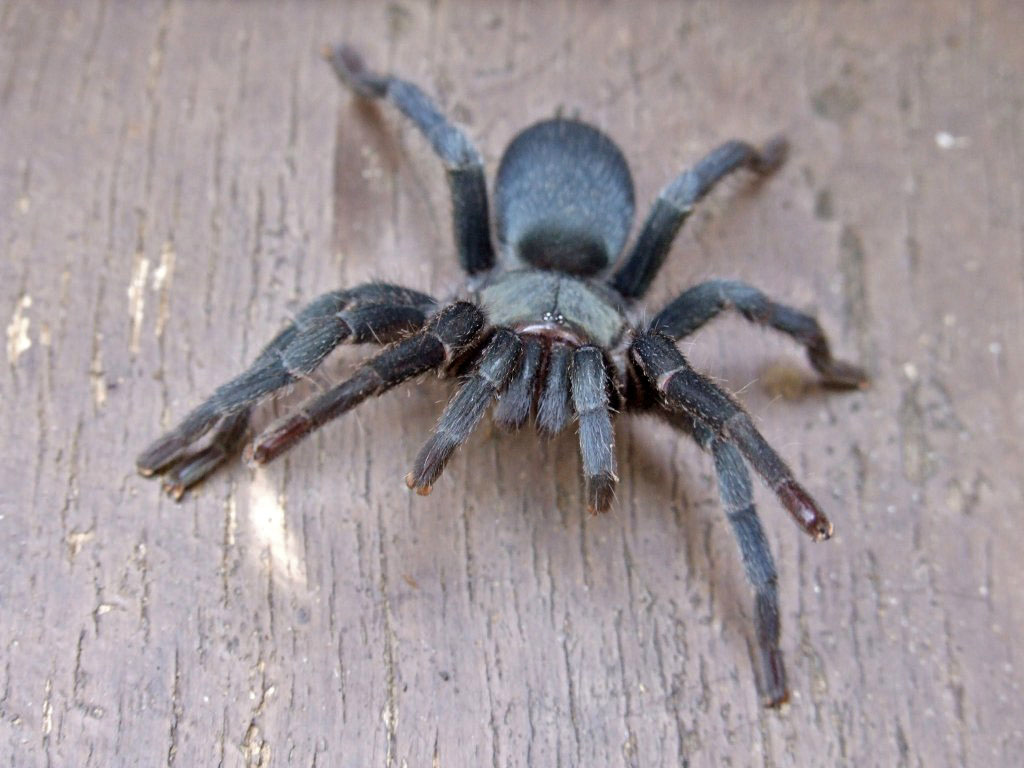

The Ischnocolinae are a problematic subfamily of tarantulas (family Theraphosidae). In 1892, Eugène Simon based the group, which he noted was only weakly homogeneous, on the presence of divided tarsal scopulae. This feature was later considered to be plesiomorphic (i.e. potentially inherited from an ancestor by multiple descendant groups), and both morphological and molecular phylogenetic studies have shown that, as traditionally circumscribed, the subfamily is not monophyletic. A much more narrowly defined Ischnocolinae sensu stricto was proposed in 2014. One of the authors of that proposal subsequently said that no further taxonomic changes should be considered until there had been a more comprehensive sampling of the subfamily. As of January 2021, the status of the Ischnocolinae remains unresolved.

== Taxonomy ==
In 1872, Anton Ausserer erected the genus Ischnocolus. Ausserer used the division of the scopulae on the tarsi of the third and fourth legs as a key characteristic. The subfamily Ischnocolinae was first described (as the group Ischnocoleae) by Eugène Simon in 1892. Following Ausserer's characterization of the genus, Simon used the divided tarsal scopulae as the defining characteristic of the group. However, Simon noted that "à part ce caractère .. les Ischnocoleae n'ont guère de particularités communes et ils forment un ensemble peu homogène" (apart from this character .. the Ischnocoleae have hardly any common characteristics and they form a weakly homogeneous set). Doubts were expressed early on as to the validity of the divided tarsal scopulae as a defining characteristic. In 1895, R.I. Pocock said that it could be "nothing but a sign of immaturity". Young spiders have only fine hairs (setae) rather than scopulae. In successive moults, scopulae replace the setae in stages, so divisions at first present may disappear when the scopulae are complete at full maturity. In spite of these concerns, genera were continually added to the subfamily, so that in 1986, for example, Andrew M. Smith said the subfamily included 49 genera, although he regarded it as "ripe for sweeping revision". In his 1985 monograph on the Mygalomorphae, Robert Raven considered the divided tarsal scopulae to be a plesiomorphic character and the Ischnocolinae to be non-monophyletic, treating it as Theraphosidae incertae sedis. His key to the subfamilies of the Theraphosidae split genera that had been placed in the subfamily among three informal groups.

In 2014, a molecular phylogenetic study was published that confirmed the non-monophyly of Ischnocolinae when broadly defined. A small number of genera could be retained in much reduced subfamily, Ischnocolinae sensu stricto, and another group were placed in a new subfamily, Schismatothelinae. The remaining genera were distributed across the theraphosid phylogeny. This result has been confirmed by other studies, one of which also suggested that the newly defined subfamily Schismatothelinae was not monophyletic.

In 2020, Guadanucci summarized the status of the subfamily at that time. Most of the members that had been studied were scattered across the family tree of the Theraphosidae. Guadanucci considered that no further taxonomic changes should be considered until there had been a comprehensive sampling of the subfamily in a molecular phylogenetic study.

=== Genera ===
According to Guadanucci in 2014, a much reduced subfamily, Ischnocolinae sensu stricto, was monophyletic. It included species from five genera:

- Acanthopelma (A. rufescens)
- Holothele – only H. longipes (included as H. rondoni) and H. culebrae of those included; the genus was recovered as non-monophyletic
- Ischnocolus (I. ignoratus, I. valentinus)
- Reichlingia (R. annae)
- Trichopelma (T. nitidum)

Species in several genera were placed in the newly created Schismatothelinae. Subsequently, some species were transferred to other genera.

- Euthycaelus (E. colonica, originally treated as Holothele colonica, plus an unidentified related species)
- Guyruita (G. cerrado, G. atlantica)
- Neoholothele (N. incei, originally treated as Holothele incei, plus an unidentified related species)
- Schismatothele (S. lineata, S. modesta, originally treated as Hemiercus modestus)
- Sickius (S. longibulbi)

Genera suggested to be excluded from the subfamily Ischnocolinae as they were unresolved across the phylogeny include:

- Catumiri
- Chaetopelma
- Dolichothele (included under junior synonym Oligoxystre)
- Heterothele
- Plesiophrictus (maybe closely allied to Neoheterophrictus but not indicated)
- Nesiergus

Also in 2014, Mirza, Sanap & Bhosale further revised some Indian taxa associated with the Ischnocolinae, described the new genus Sahydroaraneus, and treated them in the subfamily Eumenophorinae.

- Heterophrictus
- Neoheterophrictus
- Plesiophrictus
- Sahydroaraneus
