= Neoheterophrictus bhori =

Scientific classification
- Kingdom: Animalia
- Phylum: Arthropoda
- Subphylum: Chelicerata
- Class: Arachnida
- Order: Araneae
- Infraorder: Mygalomorphae
- Family: Theraphosidae
- Genus: Neoheterophrictus
- Species: N. bhori

Binomial name
- Neoheterophrictus bhori (Gravely, 1915)

Synonyms
- Plesiophrictus bhori Gravely, 1915; Heterophrictus bhori (Siliwal, Gupta & Raven, 2012)

Species of spider

Neoheterophrictus bhori is a species of tarantula. It is native to Parambiculam, Western Ghats, Cochin province, India, in present-day Kerala state.

== Etymology ==
The species name comes from the name of Mr. J. Bhore, the Dewan of Cochin, who aided Frederic Henry Gravely in his scientific research.

== Characteristics ==
This species is currently only known from the female. It is found in bamboo forest, which is unusual as few arthropods are found in such an environment. It differs from other species mainly by the spines on its legs; the first leg has a small inner apical spine on the tibia, and the second has the same spine only at an earlier stage and is accompanied by a mid-apical spine and an outer apical spine. It also lacks white setae on the extremities of the legs. It is brown, and slightly darker brown on the abdomen. The multi-lobular spermathecae are thinner than in Neoheterophrictus sahyadri and wider than in Neoheterophrictus uttarakannada or Neoheterophrictus crurofulvus.
