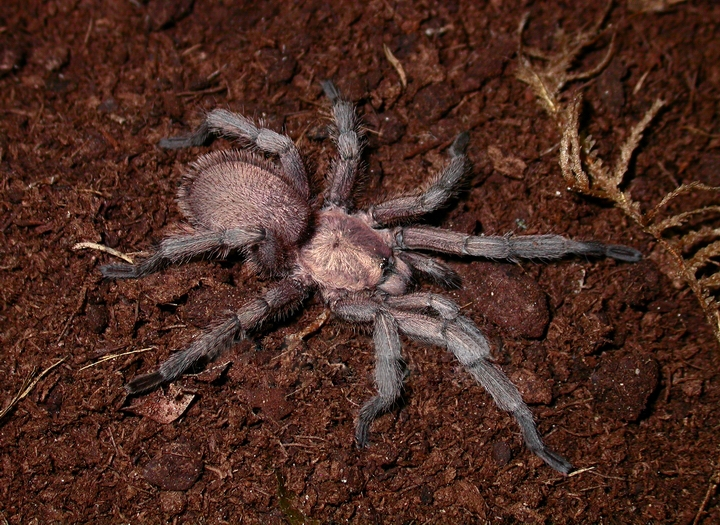
- Chaetopelma gracile

Scientific classification
- Kingdom: Animalia
- Phylum: Arthropoda
- Subphylum: Chelicerata
- Class: Arachnida
- Order: Araneae
- Infraorder: Mygalomorphae
- Family: Theraphosidae
- Genus: Chaetopelma; Ausserer, 1871

Type species
- C. olivaceum (C. L. Koch, 1841)

Species
- 8, see text

Synonyms
- Cratorrhagus Simon, 1891

= Chaetopelma =

Genus of spiders

Chaetopelma is a genus of tarantulas that was first described by Anton Ausserer in 1871. They are found in Africa, Europe, and Asia including the countries of Turkey, Syria, Egypt, Cyprus, Israel, Greece, Sudan, Cameroon, and Iran.

== Diagnosis ==
They can be distinguished from the other tarantula genera, except from Nesiergus, because the presence of clavate trichobothria in two rows on the tarsi. Males have a tibial apophysis consisting of two branches, females having a long and slender spermatheca.

== Species ==
As of November 2024 it contains eight species, found in Africa, the Balkans, Cyprus, and the Levant:

- Chaetopelma altugkadirorum Gallon, Gabriel & Tansley, 2012 – Turkey, Syria
- Chaetopelma concolor (Simon, 1873) – Turkey, Syria, Egypt
- Chaetopelma karlamani Vollmer, 1997 – Cyprus
- Chaetopelma lymberakisi Chatzaki & Komnenov, 2019 – Greece (Crete)
- Chaetopelma olivaceum (C. L. Koch, 1841) (type) – Cyprus, Turkey, Sudan, Egypt, Middle East
- Chaetopelma persianum Zalmani & West, 2023- northern Zagros Mountains, Iran
- Chaetopelma turkesi Topçu & Demircan, 2014 – Turkey
- Chaetopelma webborum Smith, 1990 – Cameroon

In synonymy:

- C. aegyptiacum Ausserer, 1871 = Chaetopelma olivaceum
- C. anatolicum Schmidt & Smith, 1995 = Chaetopelma olivaceum
- C. gracile (Ausserer, 1871) = Chaetopelma olivaceum
- C. jerusalemensis (Smith, 1990) = Chaetopelma olivaceum
- C. shabati Hassan, 1950 = Chaetopelma olivaceum
- C. syriacum (Ausserer, 1871) = Chaetopelma olivaceum
- C. tetramerum (Simon, 1873) = Chaetopelma olivaceum

=== Transferred to other genera ===
- Chaetopelma adenense Simon, 1890 → Ischnocolus jickelii
- Chaetopelma gardineri Hirst, 1911 → Nesiergus gardineri
- Chaetopelma longipes L. Koch, 1875 → Holothele longipes
- Chaetopelma olivaceum (Strand, 1907) → Encyocratella olivacea
- Chaetopelma strandi Schmidt, 1991 → Encyocratella olivacea
