= Neoheterophrictus madraspatanus =

Scientific classification
- Kingdom: Animalia
- Phylum: Arthropoda
- Subphylum: Chelicerata
- Class: Arachnida
- Order: Araneae
- Infraorder: Mygalomorphae
- Family: Theraphosidae
- Genus: Neoheterophrictus
- Species: N. madraspatanus

Binomial name
- Neoheterophrictus madraspatanus (Graveley, 1935)

Synonyms
- Plesiophrictus madraspatanus Graveley, 1935

Species of spider

Neoheterophrictus madraspatanus is a species of spider in the family Theraphosidae, found in India.

== Description ==
Males vary in body length, ranging from 7 to 20 mm; the largest females are about 19 mm long. Both sexes are brownish in colour, lighter in smaller individuals and darker in larger ones. Males have special structures on the distal end of the tibia of their first legs, including on the ventral side a large curved projection (apophysis) whose apex is divided into three.

== Taxonomy ==
First described by Frederic Henry Gravely in 1935 in the genus Plesiophrictus, the species was transferred to the genus Neoheterophrictus by Rajesh V. Sanap and Zeeshan A. Mirza in 2013, based on the structure of the male tibial spur.

== Distribution ==
The original specimens were found in the city of Madras, India, and surrounding areas.
