= Guyruita metallophila =

Guyruita metallophilia

Scientific classification
- Kingdom: Animalia
- Phylum: Arthropoda
- Subphylum: Chelicerata
- Class: Arachnida
- Order: Araneae
- Infraorder: Mygalomorphae
- Family: Theraphosidae
- Genus: Guyruita
- Species: G. metallophila

Binomial name
- Guyruita metallophila Fonseca-Ferreira, Zampaulo & Guadanucci, 2017

Species of Arachnida

Guyruita metallophila is a tarantula in the genus Guyruita; it was first described by Rafael Fonseca-Ferreira, Robson de Almeida Zampaulo, José Paulo Leite Guadanucci in 2017. This tarantula is found in Brazil, Pará in Curionópolis. It is named after the common vegetation in ironstone deposits, as in the area investigated, it was the most common species.

== Description ==
This species has dark horizontal lines on the abdomen like the Guyruita cerrado tarantula, which they can be identified by. Its carapace and legs are a light brown. These tarantulas have a troglophile behavior, and are usually found in ironstone deposits.

== Habitat ==
These tarantulas are found in ironstone deposits in the Carajás region, where its mostly forest, and the others are rocky fields. where most caves where in a superficial level, with a bit of superficial dirt. During the dry seasons this caves don't have any drip spots, but in the wet season there is.
