= Ischnocolus vanandelae =

Scientific classification
- Kingdom: Animalia
- Phylum: Arthropoda
- Subphylum: Chelicerata
- Class: Arachnida
- Order: Araneae
- Infraorder: Mygalomorphae
- Family: Theraphosidae
- Genus: Ischnocolus
- Species: I. vanandelae

Binomial name
- Ischnocolus vanandelae Montemor, West & Zamani, 2020

Species of tarantula

Ischnocolus vanandelae is a tarantula species in the Ischnocolus genus, it is found in Oman, and Iran, it was first described in 2020 by Vivian M. Montemor, Rick C. West, Alireza Zamani. This spider is named after Mrs. Priscilla M. J. van Andel, a Dutch wildlife enthusiast, who first collected this species with her husband Mr. J. H. Hans Raaijmakers.

== Description ==
Males and females have pale golden short hairs on the body, with legs being barely darker and a noticeable lineal pattern on abdomen. Males differ from other species of the Ischnocolus genus, except for Ischnocolus jickelii as the shape of the palpal bulb has a long embolus, tapering towards the apical end, with a slight fold at the apex. They can be distinguished from Ischnocolus jickelii by the size of the embolus, being longer in Ischnocolus vanandelae, and by the embolus tip. Females can be distinguished by the shape of spermathecae, composed by two triangle receptacles, Ischnocolus jickelli having a smaller spermathecae.

== Behavior ==
In Iran, a subadult female was found in a rocky dry plain, under a large rock in a self made hide along the underside of the rock, not extending vertically down. They are usually found under large rocks or at the base of large trees. The entrance to the hide was lightly silken, and younger specimens were more easily found at their hide entrances. Prey remains found in hide of this spider consisted of small darkling beetles. A mature male was found wandering the ground at night in early June suggesting a breeding season between May and June.

== Habitat ==
This tarantula is found in Oman and Iran, is found in the semi-deciduous transition zones along the Dhofar Mountains, where there is grassland and evergreen woodlands. In the majority of this areas there are no permanent waterways, but there are plenty of spring pools, throughout most of the year, the area can be considered arid, although in some months, the rain peaks. The annual rainfall is about 45–154 mm a year, peaking in July, with the average temperatures being 27 °C.
