= Chaetopelma altugkadirorum =

Scientific classification
- Kingdom: Animalia
- Phylum: Arthropoda
- Subphylum: Chelicerata
- Class: Arachnida
- Order: Araneae
- Infraorder: Mygalomorphae
- Family: Theraphosidae
- Genus: Chaetopelma
- Species: C. altugkadirorum

Binomial name
- Chaetopelma altugkadirorum Gallon, Gabriel & Tansley, 2012

Species of spider

Chaetopelma altugkadirorum is a small, Old World tarantula. This species is found in the Eastern Mediterranean, in border area of Turkey and Syria. The species closely resembles Chaetopelma olivaceum a widespread species in the region. It was first described by British arachnologists Richard C. Gallon, Ray Gabriel, and Guy Tansley in 2012. With the description of this new species the genus Chaetopelma now comprises eight species.

== Habitat ==
Chaetopelma altugkadirorum is found within burrows (up to 50 cm in depth) in light pine forest of Yayladağı district of Hatay Province of Turkey and Ras al-Bassit of Syria. Burrows were often observed in association with rotten pine stumps, with the burrow excavated along the decaying remains of the stump’s root system.

== Naming ==
The epithet altugkadirorum a patronym honouring both Turkish arachnologists Altuğ Kızıltuğ and Kadir Boğaç Kunt, whose efforts were instrumental in securing material of this species for description.
