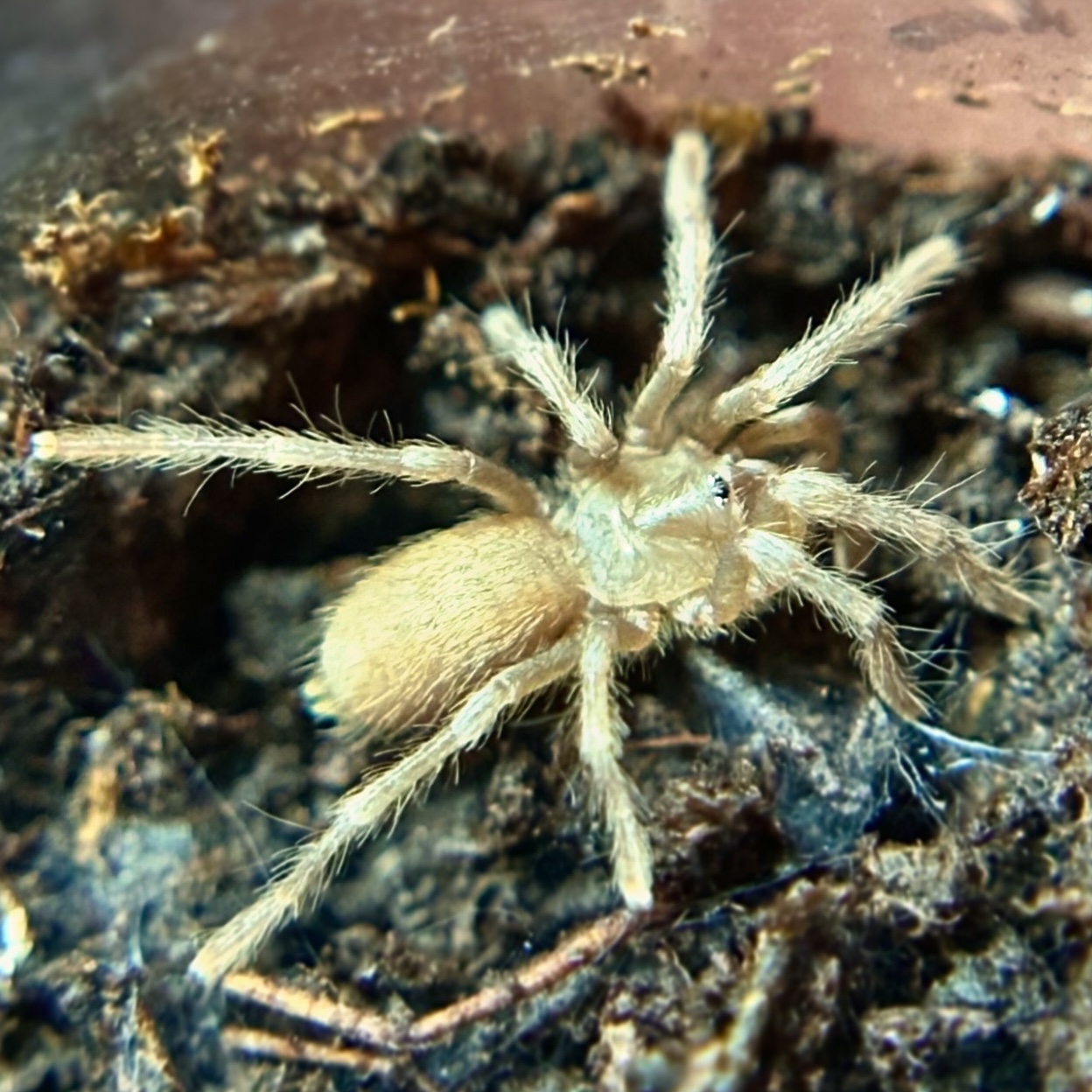

Scientific classification
- Kingdom: Animalia
- Phylum: Arthropoda
- Subphylum: Chelicerata
- Class: Arachnida
- Order: Araneae
- Infraorder: Mygalomorphae
- Family: Theraphosidae
- Genus: Chaetopelma
- Species: C. lymberakisi

Binomial name
- Chaetopelma lymberakisi (Chatzaki & Komnenov, 2019)

= Chaetopelma lymberakisi =

Species of tarantula

Chaetopelma lymberakisi is a species of tarantula commonly known as the Cretan tarantula. Its native range is restricted to the island of Crete. It was first described in 2019 by Maria Chatzaki and Marjan Komnenov and is named in honor of Petros Lymberakis, curator of vertebrates at the Natural History Museum of Crete. It is the first species of Theraphosidae reported in Greece, and the second reported in Europe after Ischnocolus valentinus. Despite being the only two species of tarantulas in Europe, Chaetopelma lymberakisi and Ischnocolus valentinus have significantly different characteristics that suggests the lack of a close phylogenetic relation between the two species.

This species can be found in coastal, sandy areas on the coast of its native island, although sightings have been reported in rocky crevices in the Lefka Ori mountains. Its coloration varies from a metallic beige as juveniles to a darker beige as they mature.

== Taxonomy ==
This species was first described by Maria Chatzaki and Marjan Komnenov in 2019. C. lymberakisi is distinguishable from other species in the genus by its differing genitalic characteristics and larger size. Geographic distribution also distinguishes the Cretan tarantula since other members of the same genus, like C. olivaceum and C. karlamani, are native only to the countries of the Levant, Egypt, and Cyprus and have no reported observations in Greece.
