= Trichopelma zebra =

Scientific classification
- Kingdom: Animalia
- Phylum: Arthropoda
- Subphylum: Chelicerata
- Class: Arachnida
- Order: Araneae
- Infraorder: Mygalomorphae
- Family: Theraphosidae
- Genus: Trichopelma
- Species: T. zebra

Binomial name
- Trichopelma zebra (Petrunkevitch, 1925)

Synonyms
- Mesothele zebra Petrunkevitch, 1925

Species of spider

Trichopelma zebra is a species of ischnocoline tarantula that is known from Panama.

== Taxonomy ==
Trichopelma zebra was first described by Alexander Petrunkevitch in 1925, under the name of Merothele zebra, a new genus he erected for the species, and which he placed in the family Barychelidae. In 1985, Robert Raven made Mesothele a junior synonym of Trichopelma, saying that "it does not differ in any character of generic significance". In 2015, the genus was placed by José Guadanucci in a much reduced subfamily of the Theraphosidae, Ischnocolinae sensu stricto.

== Description ==
T. zebra has dusky-brown femurs, spinnerets, chelicerae, and cephalothorax. All other leg segments are chestnut-brown. The abdomen is purplish-brown, with five grey stripes running backward and five median grey spots. It is 17 mm (including chelicerae).

The maxillae and labium are spinulose. It lacks a rastellum on the chelicerae. All tarsal scopulae are bisected longitudinally.
