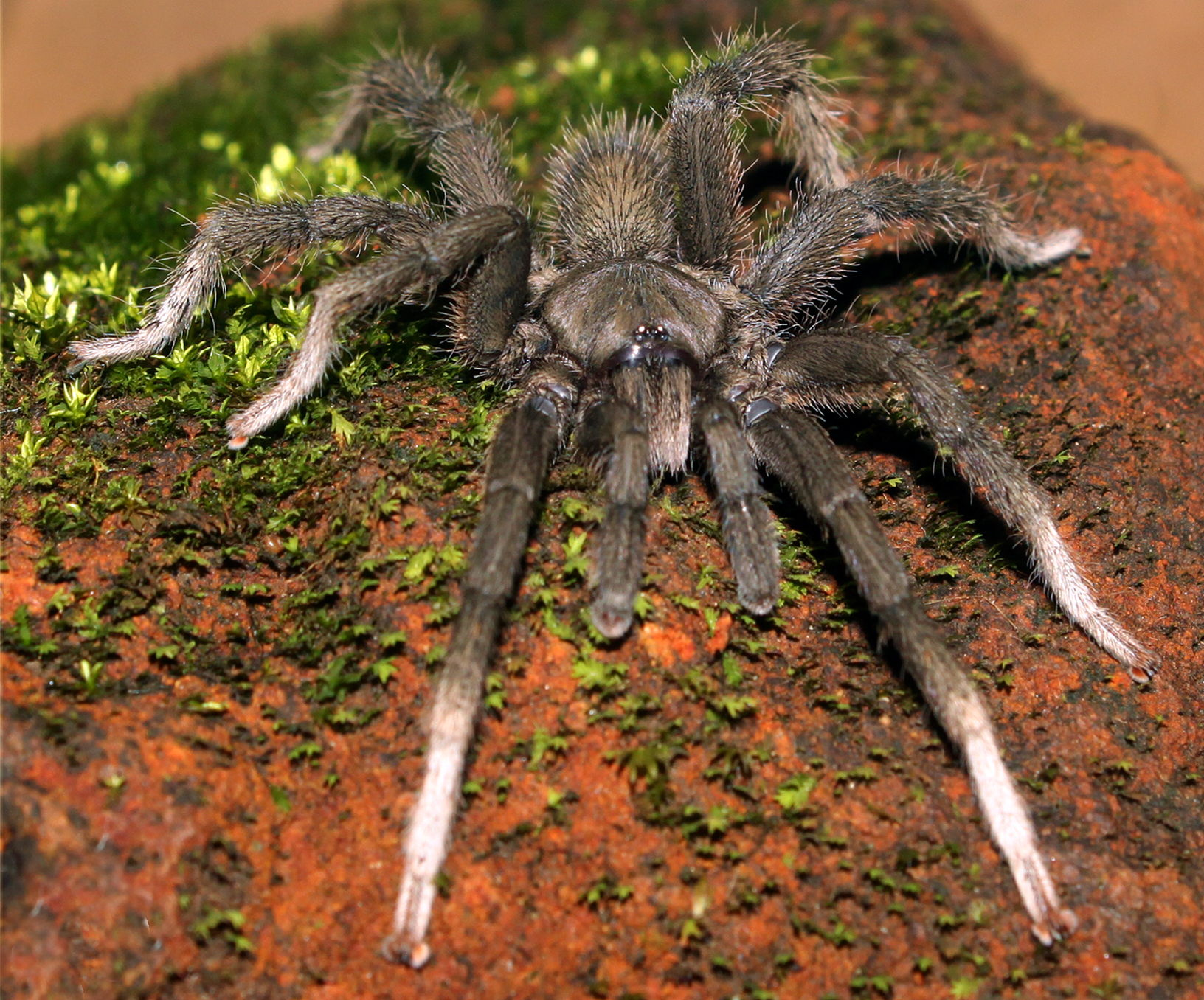
- Male
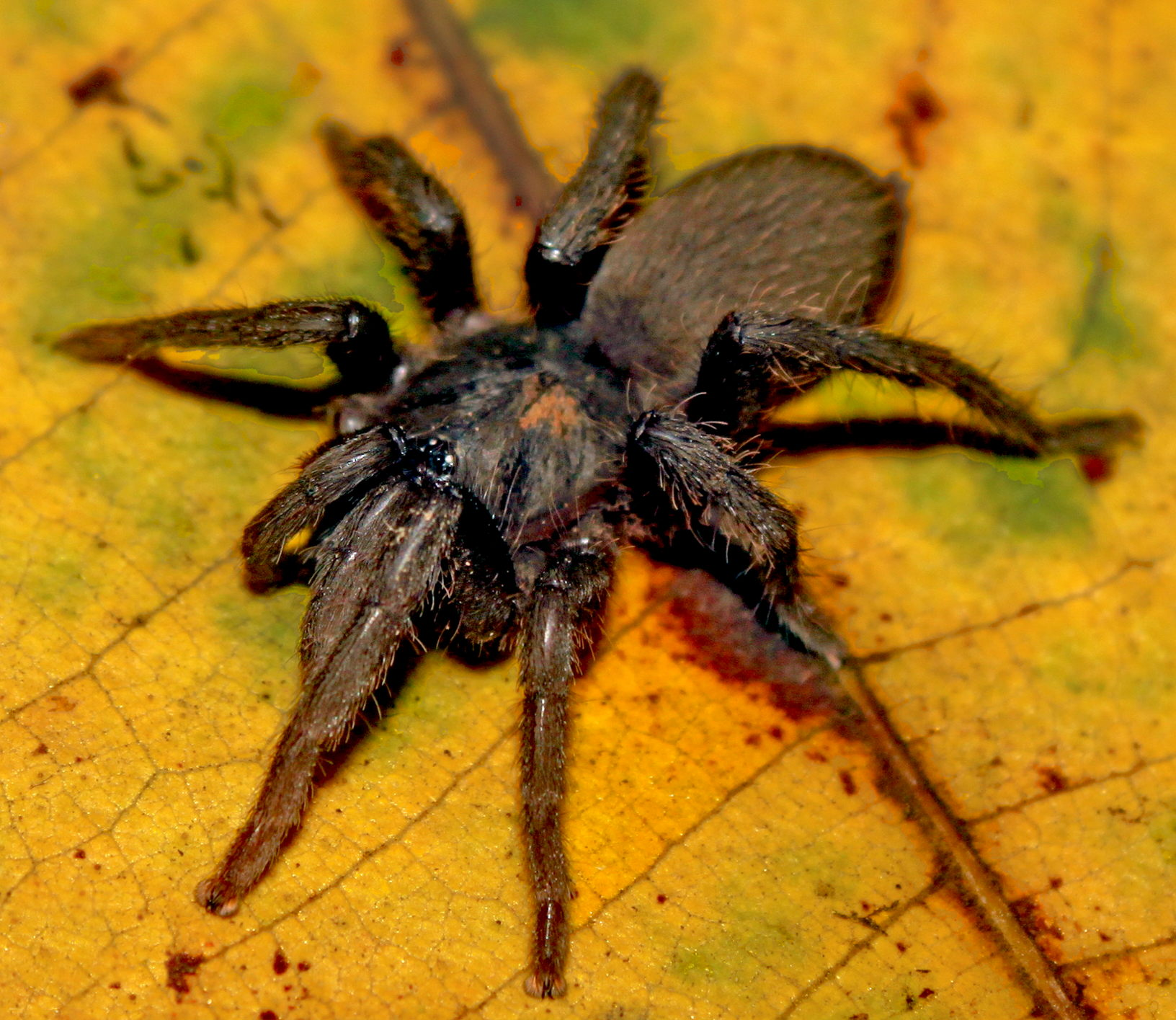
- Female

Scientific classification
- Kingdom: Animalia
- Phylum: Arthropoda
- Subphylum: Chelicerata
- Class: Arachnida
- Order: Araneae
- Infraorder: Mygalomorphae
- Family: Theraphosidae
- Genus: Neoheterophrictus
- Species: N. smithi

Binomial name
- Neoheterophrictus smithi Mirza, Bhosale & Sanap, 2014

= Neoheterophrictus smithi =

Species of spider

Neoheterophrictus smithi is a species of tarantulas, native to India.

== Etymology ==
The specific name smithi is in honour of Andrew M. Smith, who helped the authors with their project.

== Characteristics ==
Neoheterophrictus smithi mainly differs from other species of Neoheterophrictus by the presence of a long, thin spine on the base of the primary tibial apophysis. The primary tibial apophysis also ends in a spine. It has no sub-apical swelling as in N. amboli.
