= Ischnocolinopsis =

Scientific classification
- Kingdom: Animalia
- Phylum: Arthropoda
- Subphylum: Chelicerata
- Class: Arachnida
- Order: Araneae
- Infraorder: Mygalomorphae
- Family: Theraphosidae
- Genus: †Ischnocolinopsis; Wunderlich, 1988
- Species: †I. acutus

Binomial name
- †Ischnocolinopsis acutus Wunderlich, 1988

Extinct genus of spiders

Ischnocolinopsis is a genus of fossil tarantula. It has been placed in the Ischnocolinae, although this subfamily was sharply reduced in size in 2014. It is monotypic, the only species being Ischnocolinopsis acutus. It came from the Miocene period, and from the Dominican Republic. It was found in Dominican amber.

== Characteristic Features ==
Ischnocolinopsis has a cephalothorax that is much longer than wide and has a transverse fovea. The embolus is short and pointed.
