= Chaetopelma persianum =

Persian gold tarantula

Scientific classification
- Kingdom: Animalia
- Phylum: Arthropoda
- Subphylum: Chelicerata
- Class: Arachnida
- Order: Araneae
- Infraorder: Mygalomorphae
- Family: Theraphosidae
- Genus: Chaetopelma
- Species: C. persianum

Binomial name
- Chaetopelma persianum Zamani & West, 2023

Species of tarantula

Chaetopelma persianum, the Persian gold tarantula, is a species of tarantula native to northwestern Iran. First described in 2023, the species is the first of its genus to be recorded in Iran.

== Distribution ==
Chaetopelma persianum has been found at high altitudes in the Zagros Mountains, a mountain range in western Iran. A photograph of a male spider from near Sulaymaniyah (Iraq) likely represents this species, but this requires further confirmation.

== Description ==
As of August 2023, measurements have only been recorded for females and are currently unknown for males. Female Chaetopelma persianum have a leg span that measure about 9 centimeters.

C. persianum are generally brown in coloration, with the carapace and chelicerae being golden. The species is known to be burrowers.
