= Reichlingia =

Scientific classification
- Kingdom: Animalia
- Phylum: Arthropoda
- Subphylum: Chelicerata
- Class: Arachnida
- Order: Araneae
- Infraorder: Mygalomorphae
- Family: Theraphosidae
- Genus: Reichlingia; Rudloff, 2001
- Species: R. annae

Binomial name
- Reichlingia annae (Reichling, 1997)

Synonyms
- Acanthopelma annae Reichling, 1997

Genus of spiders

Reichlingia is a monotypic genus of Central American tarantulas containing the single species, Reichlingia annae. The genus was first described in 2001, and has only been found in Belize.

Originally placed with the brushed trapdoor spiders, it was moved to the tarantula family in 2014, and is a member of the Ischnocolinae subfamily. The sole species was originally described by Steven B. Reichling as Acanthopelma annae, but was changed to Reichlingia annae when it was transferred to this genus in 2001. It is named after Reichling's wife Ann, who helped with the arachnological investigation.
