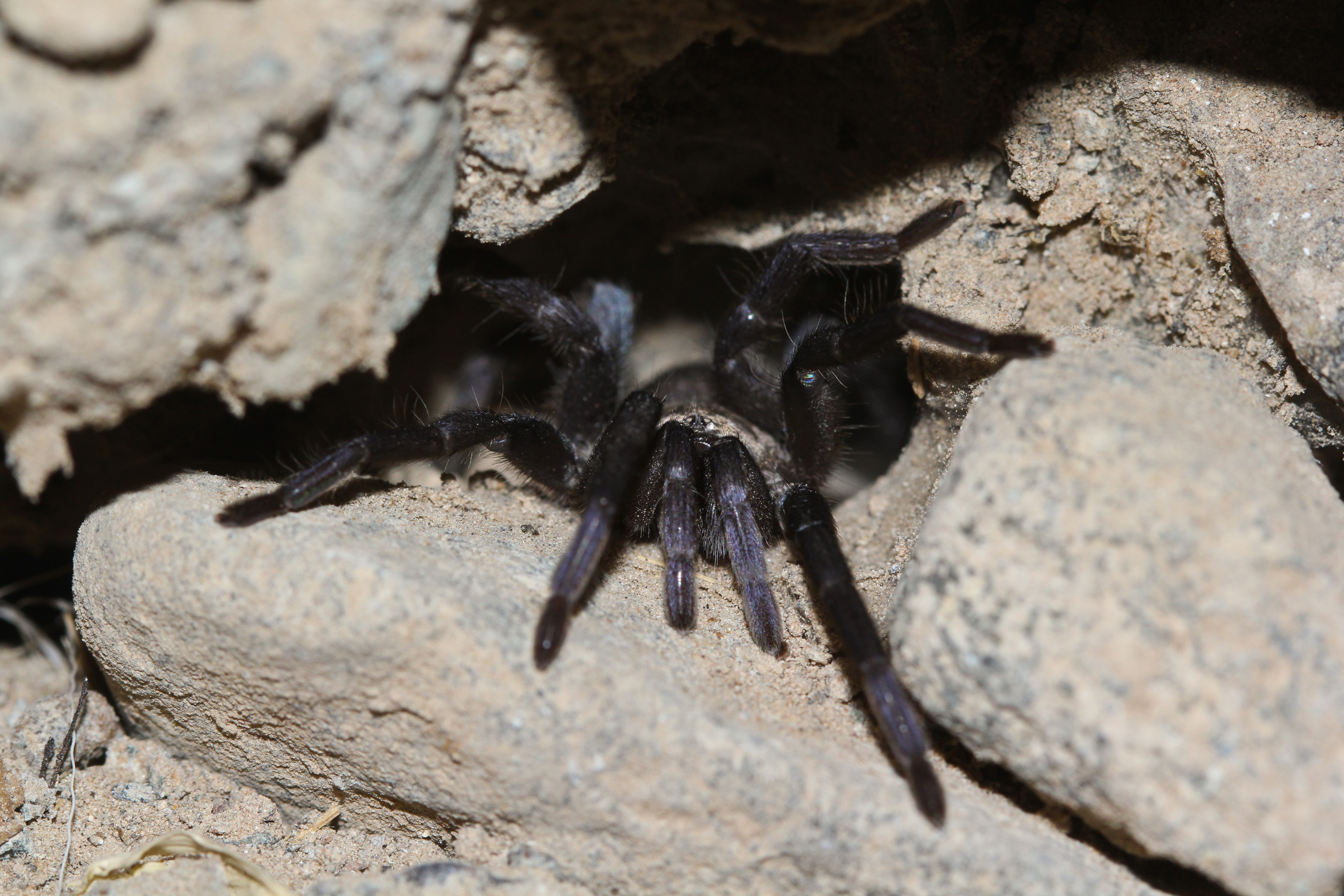
- Ischnocolus jickelii from the United Arab Emirates

Scientific classification
- Kingdom: Animalia
- Phylum: Arthropoda
- Subphylum: Chelicerata
- Class: Arachnida
- Order: Araneae
- Infraorder: Mygalomorphae
- Family: Theraphosidae
- Genus: Ischnocolus; Ausserer, 1871

Type species
- I. valentinus (Dufour, 1820)

Species
- 8, see text

= Ischnocolus =

Genus of spiders

Ischnocolus is a genus of tarantulas that was first described by Anton Ausserer in 1871. This tarantula genus includes some of the smallest in the family.

== Diagnosis ==
Males of this genus can be distinguished by the palpal bulb morphology, which owns a slightly bent apical end. Females can be distinguished by the morphology of the spermatheca, which is made up of two twisted receptacles.

== Species ==
As of May 2026 it contains nine species, found in Europe, Asia, Africa, and Brazil:

- Ischnocolus elongatus (Simon, 1873) – Morocco, Algeria
- Ischnocolus hancocki Smith, 1990 – Morocco
- Ischnocolus ignoratus Guadanucci & Wendt, 2014 – Israel, Syria
- Ischnocolus jickelii L. Koch, 1875 – Ethiopia, Eritrea, Djibouti, Somalia, Yemen, Saudi Arabia, Oman, United Arab Emirates
- Ischnocolus meron Zonstein, 2023 - Israel
- Ischnocolus mogadorensis Simon, 1909 - Morocco, Western Sahara
- Ischnocolus rubropilosus Keyserling, 1891 – Brazil
- Ischnocolus tomentosus Thorell, 1899 – Cameroon, Congo
- Ischnocolus valentinus (Dufour, 1820) (type) – Spain, Italy (Sicily), Morocco, Algeria, Tunisia, Libya
- Ischnocolus vanandelae Montemor, West & Zamani, 2020 – Oman, Iran

=== In synonymy ===
- I. adenensis (Simon, 1890) = Ischnocolus jickelii L. Koch, 1875
- I. africanus (Ausserer, 1875) = Ischnocolus elongatus (Simon, 1873)
- I. algericus Thorell, 1875 = Ischnocolus valentinus (Dufour, 1820)
- I. andalusiacus (Simon, 1873) = Ischnocolus valentinus (Dufour, 1820)
- I. cavicola (Simon, 1889) = Ischnocolus valentinus (Dufour, 1820)
- I. fuscostriatus Simon, 1885 = Ischnocolus valentinus (Dufour, 1820)
- I. holosericeus L. Koch, 1871 = Ischnocolus valentinus (Dufour, 1820)
- I. maroccanus (Simon, 1873) = Ischnocolus valentinus (Dufour, 1820)
- I. mogadorensis Simon, 1909 = Ischnocolus valentinus (Dufour, 1820)
- I. numidus Simon, 1909 = Ischnocolus valentinus (Dufour, 1820)
- I. triangulifer Ausserer, 1871 = Ischnocolus valentinus (Dufour, 1820)
- I. tripolitanus Caporiacco, 1937 = Ischnocolus valentinus (Dufour, 1820)

=== Nomina dubia ===
- Ischnocolus doleschalli Ausserer, 1871 - Brazil
- Ischnocolus fasciculatus Strand, 1906 - Ethiopia
- Ischnocolus gracilis Keyserling, 1891 - Brazil
- Ischnocolus hirsutus Ausserer, 1875 - Cuba
- Ischnocolus tunetanus Pavesi, 1880 - Tunisia

=== Transferred to other genera ===
- Ischnocolus culebrae Petrunkevitch, 1929 → Holothele culebrae
- Ischnocolus decoratus Tikader, 1977 → Chilobrachys fimbriatus
- Ischnocolus denticulatus Franganillo, 1930 → Holothele denticulata
- Ischnocolus gracilis Ausserer, 1871 → Chaetopelma olivaceum
- Ischnocolus jerusalemensis Smith, 1990 → Chaetopelma olivaceum
- Ischnocolus khasiensis Tikader, 1977 → Chilobrachys khasiensis
- Ischnocolus shoemakeri Petrunkevitch, 1926 → Holothele shoemakeri
- Ischnocolus syriacus Ausserer, 1871 → Chaetopelma olivaceum
