= Catumiri chicaoi =

Scientific classification
- Kingdom: Animalia
- Phylum: Arthropoda
- Subphylum: Chelicerata
- Class: Arachnida
- Order: Araneae
- Infraorder: Mygalomorphae
- Family: Theraphosidae
- Genus: Catumiri
- Species: C. chicaoi

Binomial name
- Catumiri chicaoi Guadanucci, 2004

Species of spider

Catumiri chicaoi is a species of spider, in the family Theraphosidae. It is endemic to Brazil.

== Etymology ==
The specific name "chicaoi" honours Josè Guadanucci's (the describer of the species) friend Kenji Kato "Chicão" who collected the type specimens.

== Distinguishing Features ==
Catumiri chicaoi is known from both the male and the female. The male differs from other species by having two spines on the retrolateral branch of the tibial spur, one of which is nearly bifurcate. The female has a unique abdominal pattern: 4-5 pairs of white spots.
