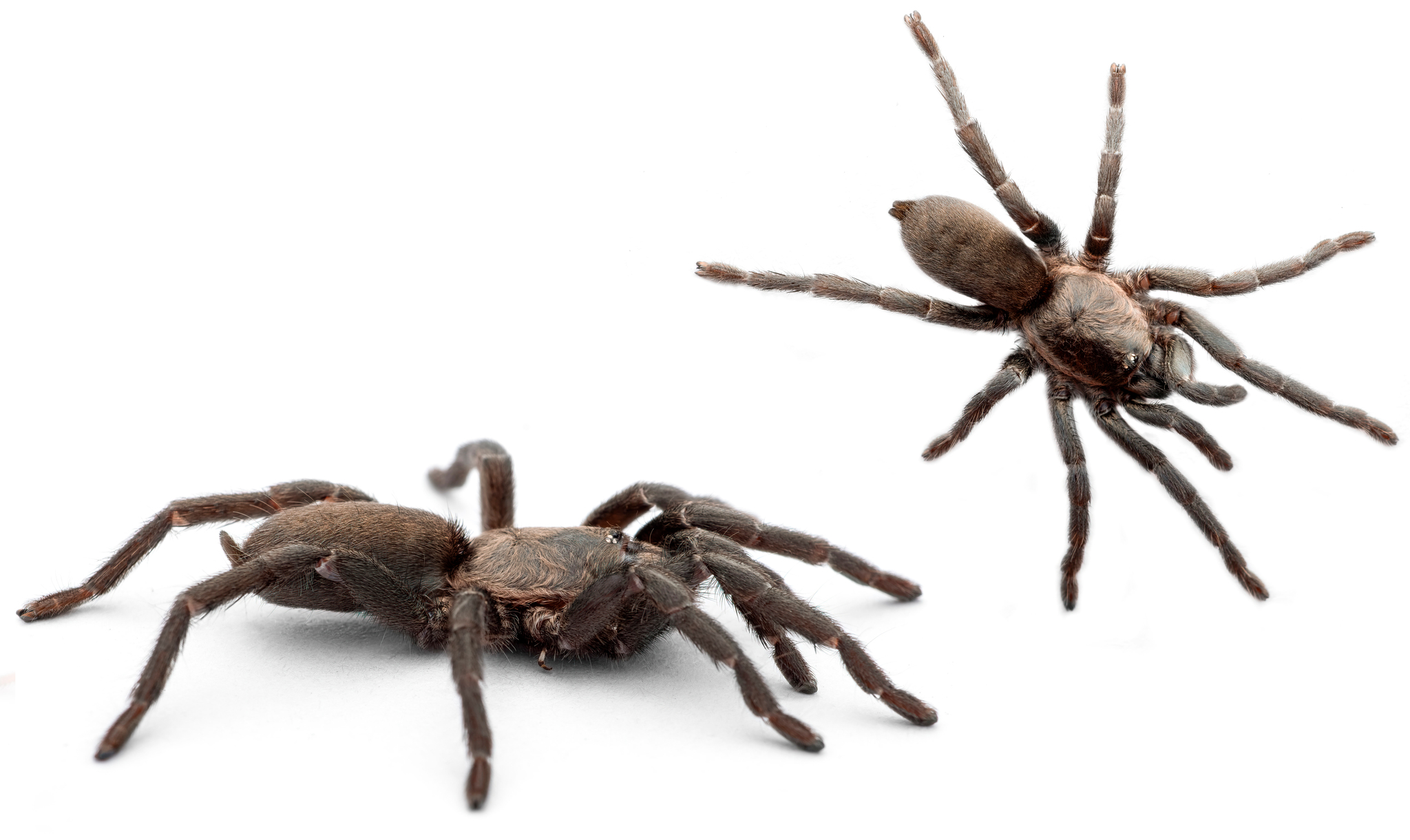

Scientific classification
- Kingdom: Animalia
- Phylum: Arthropoda
- Subphylum: Chelicerata
- Class: Arachnida
- Order: Araneae
- Infraorder: Mygalomorphae
- Family: Theraphosidae
- Genus: Ischnocolus
- Species: I. valentinus

Binomial name
- Ischnocolus valentinus (Dufour, 1820)

Synonyms
- Mygale valentina Dufour, 1820; Mygale valenciana Walckenaer, 1837; Trechona valentinus Thorell, 1870; Ischnocolus holosericeus L. Koch 1871; Ischnocolus triangulifer Ausserer, 1871; Avicularia andalusiaca Simon, 1873; Avicularia marocanna Simon, 1873; Ischnocolus andalusiacus Ausserer, 1875; Ischnocolus maroccanus Ausserer, 1875; Ischnocolus algericus Thorell, 1875; Ischnocolus fuscostriatus Simon, 1885; Ischnocolus fuscoannulatus Strand, 1908; Ischnocolus mogadorensis Simon, 1909; Ischnocolus numida Simon, 1909; Ischnocolus tripolitanus Caporiacco, 1937

= Ischnocolus valentinus =

Species of spider

Ischnocolus valentinus is a small, Old World tarantula. It is found in Spain, Sicily, Morocco, Algeria, Tunisia, Libya, and Western Sahara. It is the only species of true tarantula to occur in continental Europe, and one of two to occur in Europe along with Chaetopelma lymberakisi. It is the type species of the genus Ischnocolus. It is found in Mediterranean scrub with oaks and bushes, hiding under large flattish stones.
