= Sahydroaraneus hirsti =

Scientific classification
- Kingdom: Animalia
- Phylum: Arthropoda
- Subphylum: Chelicerata
- Class: Arachnida
- Order: Araneae
- Infraorder: Mygalomorphae
- Family: Theraphosidae
- Genus: Sahydroaraneus
- Species: S. hirsti

Binomial name
- Sahydroaraneus hirsti Mirza and Sanap (2014)

Species of spider

Sahydroaraneus hirsti is a tarantula in the genus Sahydroaraneus, it is named after A. S. Hirst for his contributions in Arachnology. This tarantula is found in Thrissur, India. This tarantula was first described by Mirza and Sanap in 2014.

== Description ==
Its carapace is reddish brown covered with gray wavy hairs, its abdomen is covered with brown hairs with numerous long gray hairs. The legs have long dark bristles, with some horizontal aligned pilose hairs. Its palpal bulb is broader at the bace gradually tampering in the end into a fine point which curves upwards.
