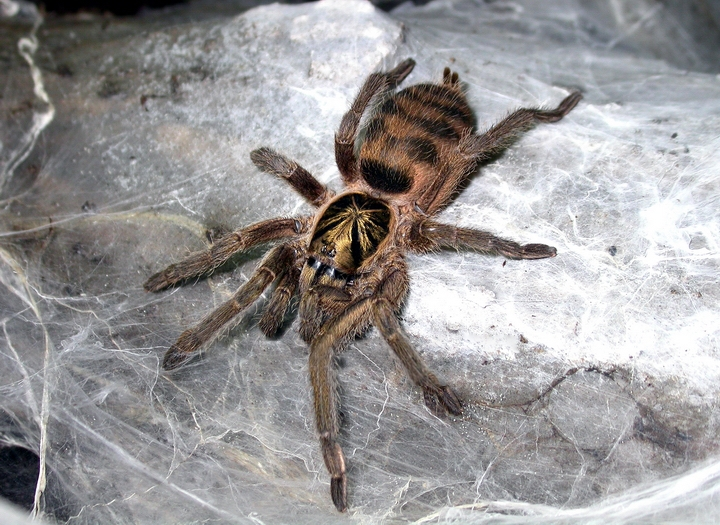
- Neoholothele incei

Scientific classification
- Kingdom: Animalia
- Phylum: Arthropoda
- Subphylum: Chelicerata
- Class: Arachnida
- Order: Araneae
- Infraorder: Mygalomorphae
- Family: Theraphosidae
- Genus: Neoholothele; Guadanucci & Weinmann, 2015

Type species
- Neoholothele incei (F. O. Pickard-Cambridge, 1899)

Species
- Neoholothele fasciaaurinigra Guadanucci & Weinmann, 2015 - Colombia; Neoholothele incei (F. O. Pickard-Cambridge, 1899) - Trinidad and Tobago, Venezuela

= Neoholothele =

Genus of spiders

Neoholothele is a genus of tarantula, first described in 2015 by Guadanucci & Weinmann. As of August 2022, it contains 2 species Neoholothele fasciaaurinigra and Neoholothele incei, the latter being the type species. They are named after the prefix "neo" from the Greek word for new, and the genus Holothele.

== Diagnosis ==
They can be distinguished by the coloration of the carapace, which is dark with a golden cephalic region. Females with a striped pattern on the abdomen, with a long and slender spermathecae receptors. Males with a retrolateral branch in the male tibial spurs with an apical end.
