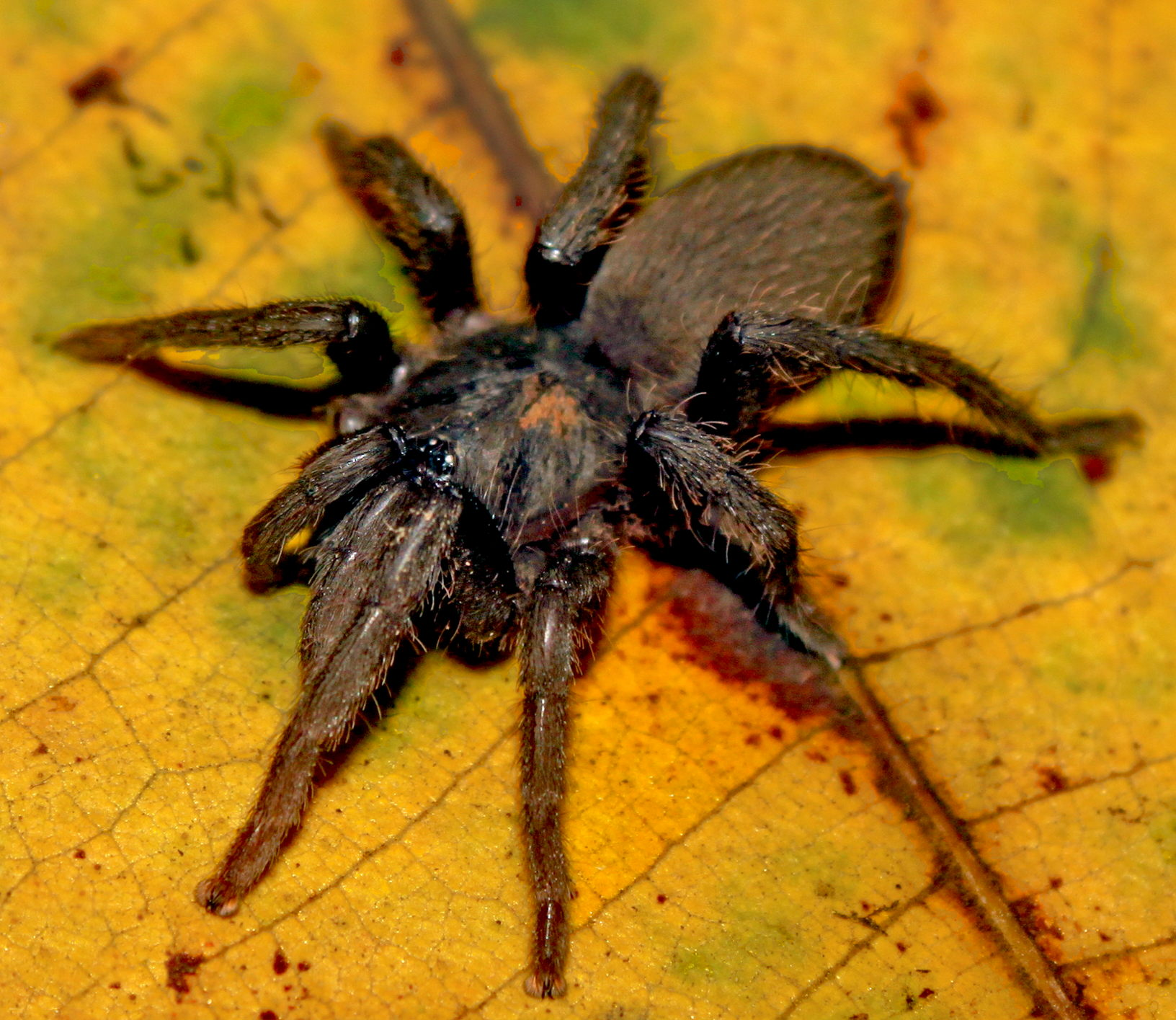
- Female Neoheterophrictus smithi

Scientific classification
- Kingdom: Animalia
- Phylum: Arthropoda
- Subphylum: Chelicerata
- Class: Arachnida
- Order: Araneae
- Infraorder: Mygalomorphae
- Family: Theraphosidae
- Genus: Neoheterophrictus; Siliwal & Raven, 2012

Type species
- Neoheterophrictus crurofulvus Siliwal, Gupta & Raven, 2012

Species
- See text.

= Neoheterophrictus =

Genus of spiders

Neoheterophrictus is a genus of tarantula in the family Theraphosidae. It comprises 8 species, all found in India.

== Characteristics ==
Neoheterophrictus is similar to Heterophrictus and Plesiophrictus, however the females differ by having a different spermathecae structure, which have two receptacles with many lobes/termini at the end. Males are distinguished from Plesiophrictus by the absence of a tegular keel on the male palpal bulb. It occurs in the Western Ghats, India.

== Etymology ==
The name is a combination of two words neo and heterophrictus, neo in Latin meaning "new" and Heterophrictus being a genus name within the family Theraphosidae.

== Species ==
As of January 2022, the World Spider Catalog recognized 8 species. All are restricted to India.

- Neoheterophrictus amboli Mirza & Sanap, 2014 - India
- Neoheterophrictus bhori (Gravely, 1915) - India
- Neoheterophrictus chimminiensis Sunil Jose, 2020 - India
- Neoheterophrictus crurofulvus Siliwal, Gupta & Raven, 2012 (type) - India
- Neoheterophrictus madraspatanus (Gravely, 1935) - India
- Neoheterophrictus sahyadri Siliwal, Gupta & Raven, 2012 - India
- Neoheterophrictus smithi Mirza, Bhosale & Sanap, 2014 - India
- Neoheterophrictus uttarakannada Siliwal, Gupta & Raven, 2012 - India
