= Trichopelma =

Scientific classification
- Kingdom: Animalia
- Phylum: Arthropoda
- Subphylum: Chelicerata
- Class: Arachnida
- Order: Araneae
- Infraorder: Mygalomorphae
- Family: Theraphosidae
- Subfamily: Ischnocolinae
- Genus: Trichopelma; Simon, 1888

Type species
- T. nitidum Simon, 1888

Species
- 29, see text

Synonyms
- Stothis Simon, 1889; Hapalopinus Simon, 1903; Merothele Petrunkevitch, 1925; Obaerarius Petrunkevitch, 1926; Leptofischelia Strand, 1929

Genus of spiders

Trichopelma is a genus of South American and Caribbean tarantulas first described by Eugène Simon in 1888.

== Taxonomy ==
This genus was erected by Eugène Simon in 1888 with Trichopelma illetabile and the type species Trichopelma nitidum. A major review of mygalomorph spiders by Robert J. Raven in 1985 led to the genus being greatly enlarged, merging it with other genera Hapalopinus, Leptofischelia, Merothele, Obaerarius and Stothis. Raven placed this expanded genus in the family Barychelidae. In 1994, he proposed moving Trichopelma to the related family Theraphosidae, but without any new evidence, the move was not generally accepted. In 2014 José P. L. Guadanucci carried out a morphological phylogenetic analysis of some mygalomorph genera, including Trichopelma. The study supported Raven's hypothesis, and the genus was moved to Theraphosidae as a member of a re-limited subfamily Ischnocolinae sensu stricto.

== Species ==
As of July 2025 it contains 29 species:

- Trichopelma affine (Simon, 1892) - St. Vincent
- Trichopelma baracoense Ríos-Tamayo, 2024 - Cuba
- Trichopelma bimini Mori & Bertani, 2020 - Bahamas
- Trichopelma cheguevarai Ríos-Tamayo, 2024 - Cuba
- Trichopelma citma Ríos-Tamayo, 2024 - Cuba
- Trichopelma coenobita (Simon, 1889) - Venezuela, Trinidad and Tobago
- Trichopelma cubanum (Simon, 1903) - Cuba
  - = Trichopelma banksia Özdikmen & Demir, 2012
  - = Trichopelma cubanum (Banks, 1909), transferred from Stothis
- Trichopelma fidelcastroi Ríos-Tamayo, 2024 - Cuba
- Trichopelma fulvum (Bryant, 1948) - Haiti
  - = Trichopelma maculosus (Bryant, 1948), transferred from Psalistops
- Trichopelma gabrieli Mori & Bertani, 2020 - Dominican Republic
- Trichopelma goloboffi Mori & Bertani, 2020 - Cuba
- Trichopelma grande Ortiz & Fonseca, 2024 - Cuba
- Trichopelma granmense Ríos-Tamayo, 2024 - Cuba
- Trichopelma huffi Mori & Bertani, 2020 - Dominican Republic
- Trichopelma illetabile Simon, 1888 - Brazil
- Trichopelma insulanum (Petrunkevitch, 1926) - US Virgin Is. (St. Thomas), Puerto Rico
  - = Trichopelma arastellatum (Franganillo, 1930), transferred from Leptopelma
  - = Trichopelma corozali (Petrunkevitch, 1929), transferred from Psalistops
- Trichopelma juventud Mori & Bertani, 2020 - Cuba
- Trichopelma laselva Valerio, 1986 - Costa Rica
- Trichopelma laurae Mori & Bertani, 2020 - Cuba
- Trichopelma loui Mori & Bertani, 2020 - Jamaica
- Trichopelma maculatum (Banks, 1906) - Bahama Is.
- Trichopelma nitidum Simon, 1888 (type) - Hispaniola
- Trichopelma platnicki Mori & Bertani, 2020 - Jamaica
- Trichopelma rudloffi Ríos-Tamayo, 2024 - Cuba
- Trichopelma soroense Ríos-Tamayo, 2024 - Cuba
- Trichopelma steini (Simon, 1889) - Venezuela
- Trichopelma tostoi Mori & Bertani, 2020 - Dominican Republic
- Trichopelma venadense (Valerio, 1986) - Costa Rica
- Trichopelma zebra (Petrunkevitch, 1925) - Panama

There are three species categorized as nomina dubia (doubtful names):

- Trichopelma eucubanum Özdikmen & Demir, 2012 - Cuba, replacement name; originally Stothis maculata Franganillo, 1930
- Trichopelma scopulatum (Fischel, 1927) - Venezuela, originally in Leptostylus and changed to the replacement name Leptofischelia
- Trichopelma spinosum (Franganillo, 1926) - Cuba, originally in Stothis
