= Plesiophrictus tenuipes =

Scientific classification
- Kingdom: Animalia
- Phylum: Arthropoda
- Subphylum: Chelicerata
- Class: Arachnida
- Order: Araneae
- Infraorder: Mygalomorphae
- Family: Theraphosidae
- Genus: Plesiophrictus
- Species: P. tenuipes

Binomial name
- Plesiophrictus tenuipes Pocock, 1899

Species of spider

Plesiophrictus tenuipes, is a species of spider of the genus Plesiophrictus. It is endemic to Sri Lanka.
