= Heterothele gabonensis =

Scientific classification
- Kingdom: Animalia
- Phylum: Arthropoda
- Subphylum: Chelicerata
- Class: Arachnida
- Order: Araneae
- Infraorder: Mygalomorphae
- Family: Theraphosidae
- Genus: Heterothele
- Species: H. gabonensis

Binomial name
- Heterothele gabonensis (Lucas, 1858)

Species of tarantula

Heterothele gabonensis, also known as the Gabon blue dwarf baboon tarantula, is a species of tarantula found in Gabon. It was first described by Pierre Hippolyte Lucas in 1858, under the name Mygale gabonensis. They are semi arboreal tarantulas, that web quite a lot. They have also showed some communal tendencies in the form of tolerance for one another over an extended period of time.

== Description ==
Females live up to 7 years, while males only live to 2. Their carapace is a golden color, with some black coloration, their legs are black, under certain light it may look dark blue, with golden colored segmentations. Their opisthosoma is golden, with a lot of black striping, forming an intricate pattern.

== Habitat ==
They are usually found in the open forests of Lope National Park, Gabon, especially in the Uapaca trees, there they can be found in high numbers, living close to one another. The average temperature is 26°C with average yearly rainfall of 1,800mm. It is home to animals such as Forest Elephants, Mandrills and Black Guineafowls.

== Behavior ==
They are semi arboreal tarantulas, making intricate webs in leaves and branches. They are skittish, preferring to run rather than fight, but they are also willing to bite. They have also shown communal tendencies, as they will tolerate each other for extended periods of time, though this has not been fully tested. Being compared to the Heterothele villosella tarantula, with its level of communalism.This of course is not recommended in captivity, especially with such a rare tarantula.
