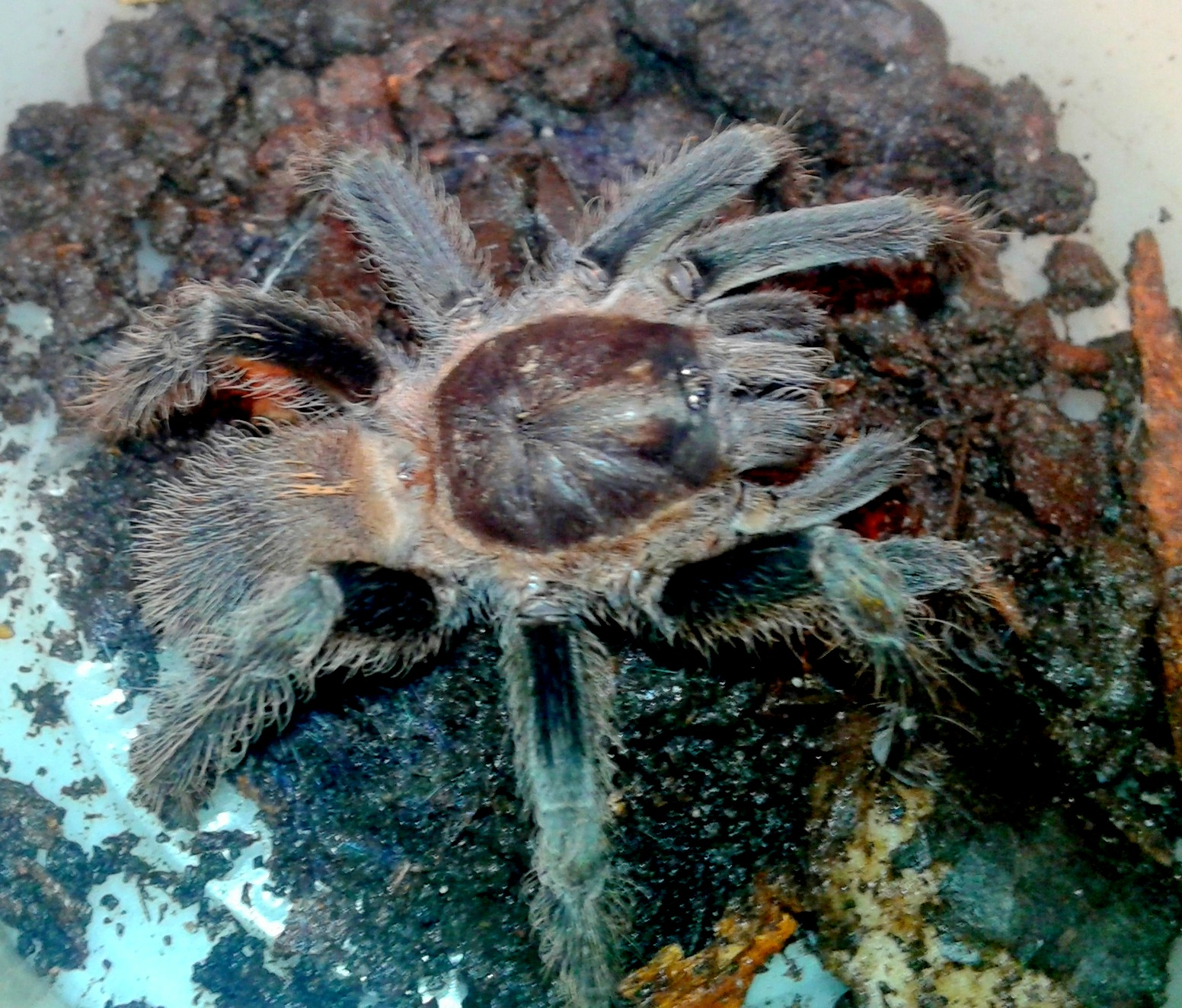

Scientific classification
- Kingdom: Animalia
- Phylum: Arthropoda
- Subphylum: Chelicerata
- Class: Arachnida
- Order: Araneae
- Infraorder: Mygalomorphae
- Family: Theraphosidae
- Genus: Holothele; Karsch, 1879

Type species
- H. longipes (L. Koch, 1875)

Species
- 6, see text

Synonyms
- Dryptopelmides Strand, 1907; Stichoplastus Simon, 1889

= Holothele =

Genus of spiders

Holothele is a genus of tarantulas that was first described by Ferdinand Anton Franz Karsch in 1879. Originally placed with the curtain-web spiders, it was transferred to the tarantulas in 1980.

== Diagnosis ==
They can be distinguished by the lack of urticating hairs, tarsus 4 being pseudo segmented. The tarsal claws own a row of teeth, and a labium with around 90 cuspules.

== Species ==
As of July 2022 it contains six species, found in the West Indies and in the north of South America:

- Holothele culebrae (Petrunkevitch, 1929) – Puerto Rico
- Holothele denticulata (Franganillo, 1930) – Cuba
- Holothele longipes (L. Koch, 1875) (type) – Panama, Venezuela, Bolivia, Trinidad and Tobago, Guyana, Suriname, French Guiana, Brazil
- Holothele maddeni (Esposito & Agnarsson, 2014) - Dominican Republic
- Holothele shoemakeri (Petrunkevitch, 1926) – US Virgin Islands (St. Thomas)
- Holothele sulfurensis Maréchal, 2005 – Guadeloupe

=== In synonymy ===
- H. ludwigi (Strand, 1907) = Holothele longipes (L. Koch, 1875)
- H. ravida (Simon, 1889) = Holothele longipes (L. Koch, 1875)
- H. recta Karsch, 1879 = Holothele longipes (L. Koch, 1875)
- H. rondoni (Lucas & Bücherl, 1972) = Holothele longipes (L. Koch, 1875)
- H. sanguiniceps (F. O. Pickard-Cambridge, 1899) = Holothele longipes (L. Koch, 1875)

=== Transferred to other genera ===
- Holothele anomala (Mello-Leitão, 1923) → Proshapalopus anomalus
- Holothele asterix (Valerio, 1980) → Stichoplastoris asterix
- Holothele cervina (Simon, 1889) → Euthycaelus colonica
- Holothele colonica (Simon, 1889) → Euthycaelus colonica
- Holothele culebrae (Petrunkevitch, 1929) → Cyrtopholis culebrae
- Holothele denticulata (Valerio, 1980) → Stichoplastoris denticulatus
- Holothele doeringi (Holmberg, 1881) → Grammostola doeringi
- Holothele elusinus (Valerio, 1980) → Stichoplastoris elusinus
- Holothele incei (F. O. Pickard-Cambridge, 1898) → Neoholothele incei
- Holothele inflata (Simon, 1889) → Schismatothele inflata
- Holothele kastoni (Caporiacco, 1955) → Schismatothele kastoni
- Holothele lineata (Karsch, 1879) → Schismatothele lineata
- Holothele modesta (Simon, 1889) → Schismatothele modesta
- Holothele obelix (Valerio, 1980) → Stichoplastoris obelix
- Holothele obsoleta (Franganillo, 1935) → Cyrtopholis obsoleta
- Holothele proxima (Mello-Leitão, 1923) → Acanthoscurria proxima (Nomen dubnium)
- Holothele sericeus (Simon, 1903) → Scopelobates sericeus
- Holothele spinulosa (F. O. Pickard-Cambridge, 1897) → Acentropelma spinulosum
- Holothele steini (Simon, 1889) → Trichopelma steini
- Holothele variegata (Caporiacco, 1955) → Hapalopus variegatus
- Holothele vellardi Rudloff, 1997 → Neoholothele incei
- Holothele waikoshiemi Bertani & Araújo, 2006 → Yanomamius waikoshiemi
