= Plesiophrictus =

Scientific classification
- Kingdom: Animalia
- Phylum: Arthropoda
- Subphylum: Chelicerata
- Class: Arachnida
- Order: Araneae
- Infraorder: Mygalomorphae
- Family: Theraphosidae
- Genus: Plesiophrictus; Pocock, 1899

Type species
- P. millardi Pocock, 1899

Species
- 8, see text

Synonyms
- Ischnocolella Strand, 1907

Genus of spiders

Plesiophrictus is a genus of tarantulas that was first described by Reginald Innes Pocock in 1899.

== Species ==
As of May 2020 it contains eight species, found in Sri Lanka, India, and Micronesia:

- Plesiophrictus fabrei (Simon, 1892) – India
- Plesiophrictus linteatus (Simon, 1891) – India
- Plesiophrictus meghalayaensis Tikader, 1977 – India
- Plesiophrictus millardi Pocock, 1899 (type) – India
- Plesiophrictus nilagiriensis Siliwal, Molur & Raven, 2007 – India
- Plesiophrictus senffti (Strand, 1907) – Micronesia
- Plesiophrictus sericeus Pocock, 1900 – India
- Plesiophrictus tenuipes Pocock, 1899 – Sri Lanka

Formerly included:

- P. bhori Gravely, 1915 (Transferred to Heterophrictus)
- P. blatteri Gravely, 1935 (Transferred to Heterophrictus)
- P. collinus Pocock, 1899 (Transferred to Sahydroaraneus)
- P. guangxiensis Yin & Tan, 2000 (Transferred to Chilobrachys)
- P. madraspatanus Gravely, 1935 (Transferred to Neoheterophrictus)
- P. mahabaleshwari Tikader, 1977 (Transferred to Heterophrictus)
- P. milleti (Pocock, 1900) (Transferred to Heterophrictus)
- P. raja Gravely, 1915 (Transferred to Sahydroaraneus)
