= Scopelobates =

Scientific classification
- Kingdom: Animalia
- Phylum: Arthropoda
- Subphylum: Chelicerata
- Class: Arachnida
- Order: Araneae
- Infraorder: Mygalomorphae
- Family: Theraphosidae
- Genus: Scopelobates; Simon, 1903
- Species: S. sericeus

Binomial name
- Scopelobates sericeus Simon, 1903

Synonyms
- Holothele sericea (Simon, 1903)

Genus of spiders

Scopelobates is a genus of tarantulas containing the single species, Scopelobates sericeus. It was first described by Eugène Simon in 1903, and is only found in Dominican Republic.
