= Neoheterophrictus crurofulvus =

Scientific classification
- Kingdom: Animalia
- Phylum: Arthropoda
- Subphylum: Chelicerata
- Class: Arachnida
- Order: Araneae
- Infraorder: Mygalomorphae
- Family: Theraphosidae
- Genus: Neoheterophrictus
- Species: N. crurofulvus

Binomial name
- Neoheterophrictus crurofulvus (Siliwal, Gupta, & Raven, 2012)

Species of spider

Neoheterophrictus crurofulvus is a species of tarantula. It is also the type species of Neoheterophrictus and is found in the Western Ghats, India.

== Etymology ==
The specific name crurofulvus is a mixture of two Latin words: cruro meaning "leg" or "appendage"; and fulvus meaning "tawny" or "yellowish-brown". This refers to the light brown colour of the legs of the female, which is not seen in any other Indian Theraphosid.

== Distinguishing features ==
Neoheterophrictus crurofulvus is known from the male and female. The female is distinguished by the structure of the spermathecae; there are two receptacles, which narrow at the apex; also upon the apex are a multitude of tiny lobes.

The male differs from other species by having a tibial spur which narrows down towards the apex where there is a pointed spine; it also lacks a basal spine in the retrolateral view of the spur; and the retrolateral two-thirds of the metatarsi and the whole tarsi are coloured white or cream.
