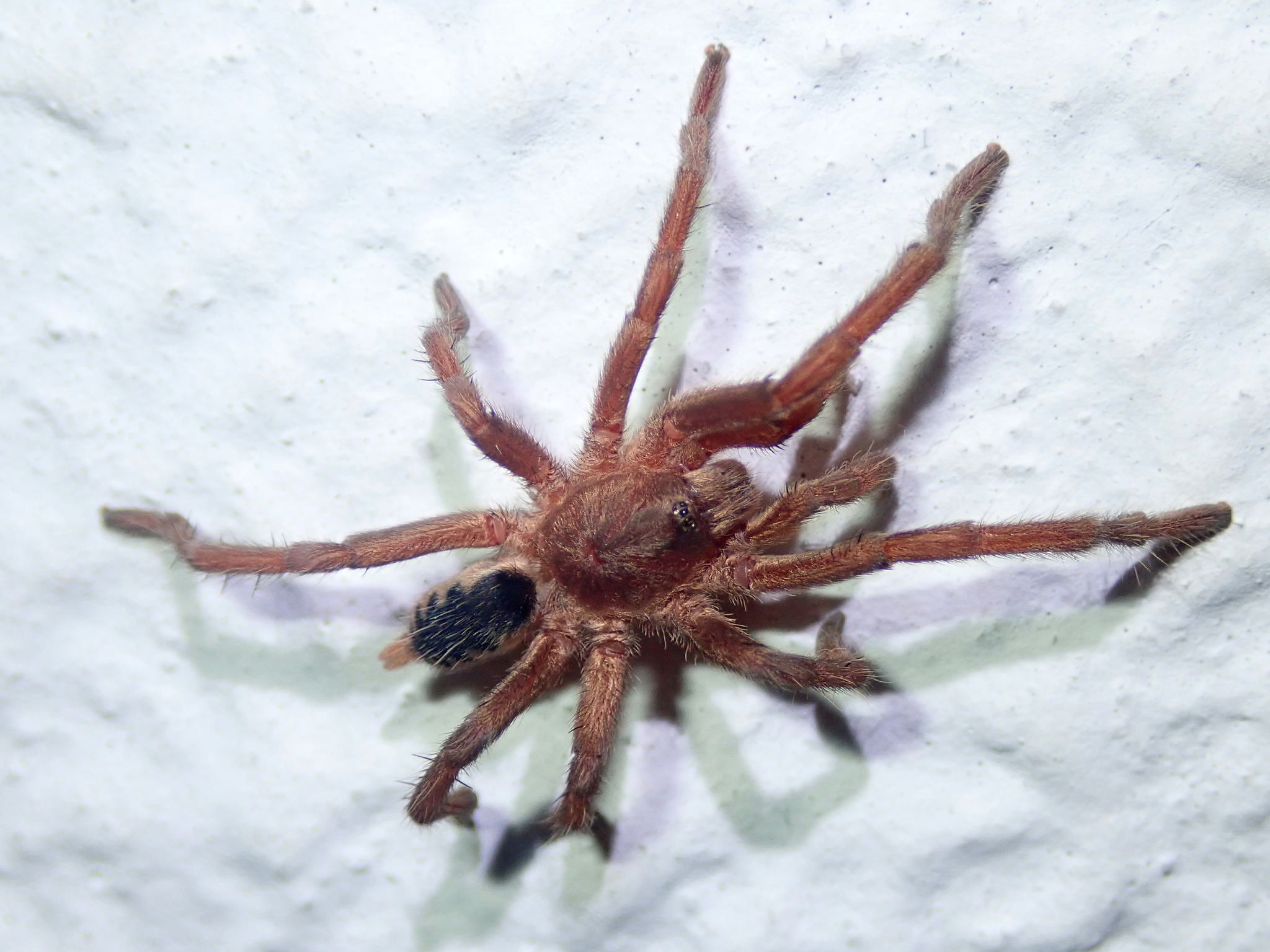
- Guyruita cerrado

Scientific classification
- Kingdom: Animalia
- Phylum: Arthropoda
- Subphylum: Chelicerata
- Class: Arachnida
- Order: Araneae
- Infraorder: Mygalomorphae
- Family: Theraphosidae
- Genus: Guyruita; Guadanucci, Lucas, Indicatti & Yamamoto, 2007

Type species
- G. cerrado Guadanucci, Lucas, Indicatti & Yamamoto, 2007

Species
- 6, see text

= Guyruita =

Genus of spiders

Guyruita is a genus of South American tarantulas that was first described by J. P. L. Guadanucci in 2007.

== Species ==
As of March 2020 it contains six species, found in Venezuela and Brazil:

- Guyruita atlantica Guadanucci, Lucas, Indicatti & Yamamoto, 2007 – Brazil
- Guyruita cerrado Guadanucci, Lucas, Indicatti & Yamamoto, 2007 (type) – Brazil
- Guyruita giupponii Fukushima & Bertani, 2018 – Brazil
- Guyruita isae Fukushima & Bertani, 2018 – Brazil
- Guyruita metallophila Fonseca-Ferreira, Zampaulo & Guadanucci, 2017 – Brazil
- Guyruita waikoshiemi (Bertani & Araújo, 2006) – Venezuela, Brazil
