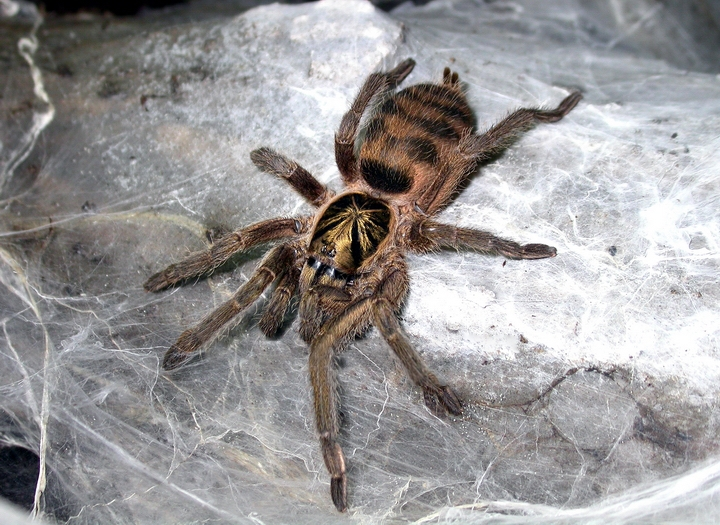
- Neoholothele incei

Scientific classification
- Kingdom: Animalia
- Phylum: Arthropoda
- Subphylum: Chelicerata
- Class: Arachnida
- Order: Araneae
- Infraorder: Mygalomorphae
- Family: Theraphosidae
- Genus: Neoholothele
- Species: N. incei

Binomial name
- Neoholothele incei (F.O. Pickard-Cambridge, 1898)

Synonyms
- Holothele incei (F.O. Pickard-Cambridge, 1898)

= Neoholothele incei =

Species of spider

Neoholothele incei is a species of tarantula from Trinidad and Venezuela, commonly called the Trinidad olive tarantula. When mature, the species has a leg-span exceeding 5–7.5 cm (2.0–3.0 in). As often the case with tarantulas, the females live longer than males, with the former living up to 7 years compared to the 2 years that males can expect to reach. N. incei is a bird spider and is fossorial. It is commonly kept as a pet as it is easy to breed. Rarely for tarantulas, N. incei is known to live communally and cannibalism is rare except for times of extreme hunger. Like most New World species, the venom of N. incei is considered to be mild and comparable to a bee sting, however no research has confirmed this.

This species has a golden carapace and its abdomen is striped.
