= Schismatothele =

Scientific classification
- Kingdom: Animalia
- Phylum: Arthropoda
- Subphylum: Chelicerata
- Class: Arachnida
- Order: Araneae
- Infraorder: Mygalomorphae
- Family: Theraphosidae
- Genus: Schismatothele; Karsch, 1879

Type species
- S. lineata Karsch, 1879

Species
- 16, see text

Synonyms
- Hemiercus Simon, 1903

Genus of spiders

Schismatothele is a genus of South American tarantulas that was first described by Ferdinand Anton Franz Karsch in 1879.

== Species ==
As of April 2023 it contains sixteen species, found in South America:

- Schismatothele benedettii Panzera, Perdomo & Pérez-Miles, 2011 - Brazil
- Schismatothele caeri Moeller, Weinmann & Guadanucci, 2023 - Trinidad and Tobago
- Schismatothele caiquetia Moeller, Weinmann & Guadanucci, 2023 - Venezuela
- Schismatothele hacaritama Perafán, Valencia-Cuéllar & Guadanucci, 2019 - Colombia
- Schismatothele inflata (Simon, 1889) (type) - Venezuela
- Schismatothele kastoni (Caporiacco, 1955) - Venezuela
- Schismatothele lineata Karsch, 1879 - Venezuela
- Schismatothele merida Moeller, Weinmann & Guadanucci, 2023 - Venezuela
- Schismatothele modesta (Simon, 1889) - Colombia
- Schismatothele moonenorum Moeller, Weinmann & Guadanucci, 2023 - French Guiana
- Schismatothele olsoni Guadanucci, Perafán & Valencia-Cuéllar, 2019 - Colombia, Venezuela
- Schismatothele opifex (Simon, 1889) - Venezuela
- Schismatothele quimbaya Moeller, Weinmann & Guadanucci, 2023 - Colombia
- Schismatothele timotocuica Moeller, Weinmann & Guadanucci, 2023 - Venezuela
- Schismatothele wayana Moeller, Weinmann & Guadanucci, 2023 - Brazil
- Schismatothele weinmanni Guadanucci, Perafán & Valencia-Cuéllar, 2019 - Colombia
