= Heterothele =

Scientific classification
- Kingdom: Animalia
- Phylum: Arthropoda
- Subphylum: Chelicerata
- Class: Arachnida
- Order: Araneae
- Infraorder: Mygalomorphae
- Family: Theraphosidae
- Genus: Heterothele; Karsch, 1879

Type species
- H. honesta Karsch, 1879

Species
- See text.

Genus of spiders

Heterothele is a genus of African tarantulas (family Theraphosidae) that was first described by Ferdinand Anton Franz Karsch in 1879.

== Species ==
As of June 2025, it contained ten species, found in Africa:

- Heterothele affinis Laurent, 1946 – Congo, Tanzania
- Heterothele atropha Simon, 1907 – Congo
- Heterothele darcheni (Benoit, 1966) – Gabon
- Heterothele decemnotata (Simon, 1891) – Congo
- Heterothele erdosi Sherwood & Gallon, 2025 – Nigeria
- Heterothele gabonensis (Lucas, 1858) – Gabon
- Heterothele honesta Karsch, 1879 (type) – Angola
- Heterothele hullwilliamsi Smith, 1990 – Cameroon
- Heterothele ogbunikia Smith, 1990 – Nigeria
- Heterothele spinipes Pocock, 1897 – Tanzania
