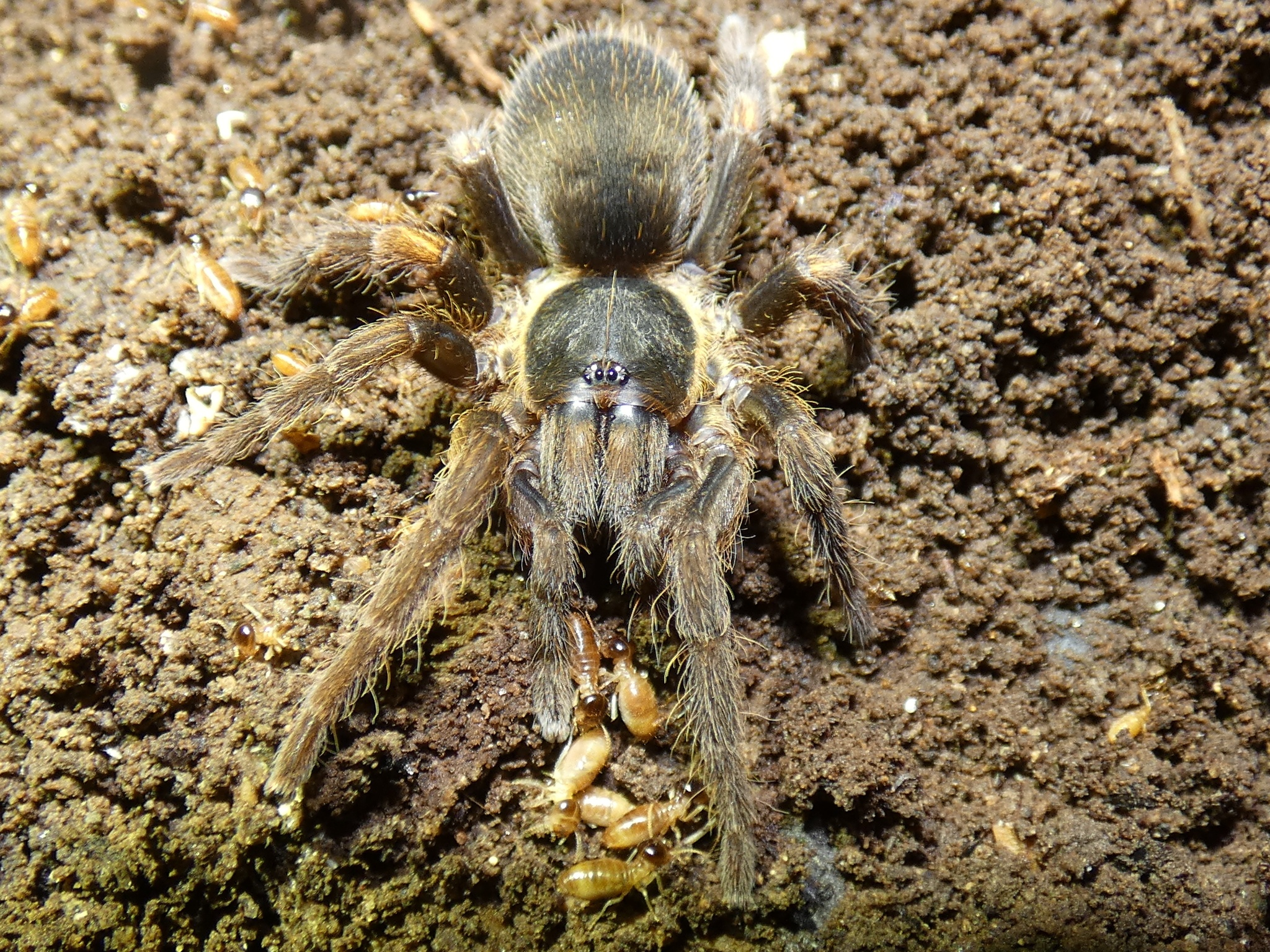
- Euthycaelus quinteroi

Scientific classification
- Kingdom: Animalia
- Phylum: Arthropoda
- Subphylum: Chelicerata
- Class: Arachnida
- Order: Araneae
- Infraorder: Mygalomorphae
- Family: Theraphosidae
- Genus: Euthycaelus; Simon

Type species
- Euthycaelus colonica Simon, 1889

Species
- 7, see text

= Euthycaelus =

Genus of spiders

Euthycaelus is a genus of tarantula. It was first described in 1889 by Simon, and is found through Central and South America.

== Species ==
As of December 2022, it contained 7 species:

- Euthycaelus amandae Guadanucci & Weinmann, 2014 - Colombia
- Euthycaelus astutus (Simon, 1889) - Venezuela
- Euthycaelus colonica Simon, 1889 - Venezuela
- Euthycaelus guane Valencia-Cuellar, Perafán & Guadanucci, 2019 - Colombia
- Euthycaelus janae Sherwood & Gabriel, 2022 - Peru
- Euthycaelus norae Guadanucci & Weinmann, 2014 - Colombia, Venezuela
- Euthycaelus quinteroi Gabriel & Sherwood, 2022 - Panama
