= Neoheterophrictus uttarakannada =

Scientific classification
- Kingdom: Animalia
- Phylum: Arthropoda
- Subphylum: Chelicerata
- Class: Arachnida
- Order: Araneae
- Infraorder: Mygalomorphae
- Family: Theraphosidae
- Genus: Neoheterophrictus
- Species: N. uttarakannada

Binomial name
- Neoheterophrictus uttarakannada Siliwal, Gupta & Raven, 2012

Species of spider

Neoheterophrictus uttarakannada is a species of spiders in the genus Neoheterophrictus from India. It was first described in 2012 by Manju Siliwal, Neha Gupta, & Robert John Raven. Its name comes from the place where it was discovered, Uttara Kannada.

== Characteristics ==
The species is only known from the female. It is identified by two short spermathecae receptacles (which show some constriction at the ends), with multiple (6-7) large contiguous lobes at the end. Its legs have short yellow-orange tarsal hairs, and the full body colour is grey-brown. It makes temporary holes under stones.
