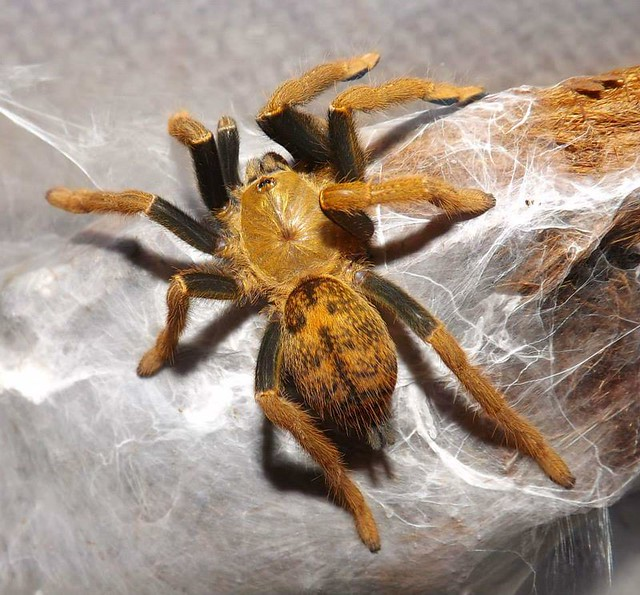

Scientific classification
- Kingdom: Animalia
- Phylum: Arthropoda
- Subphylum: Chelicerata
- Class: Arachnida
- Order: Araneae
- Infraorder: Mygalomorphae
- Family: Theraphosidae
- Genus: Encyocratella; Strand, 1907
- Species: E. olivacea

Binomial name
- Encyocratella olivacea Strand, 1907

Synonyms
- Xenodendrophila Gallon, 2003

= Encyocratella =

Genus of spiders

Encyocratella is a monotypic genus of Tanzanian tarantulas (family Theraphosidae) containing the single species, Encyocratella olivacea, also known as the Tanzanian black and olive baboon spider. It was first described by Embrik Strand in 1907, and is found in Tanzania.

== Description ==
They are one of two tarantulas which females do not have a spermatheca, instead opting for oviducts and uterus externus. Its carapace is a golden color, with a golden opisthosoma with a black fishbone pattern and spotting. The femur is a deep black color, with the rest of the legs being golden as most of the rest of the body.

== Habitat ==
They are found in the rainforests on the southern slopes of mount Meru in the Arusha Region. The average temperature is 19°C, with average yearly rainfall of 1400mm. They are usually found 2200 m above sea level, a region that is home to plants such as Juniperus, Lobelia and Sedum.

== Behavior ==
They are arboreal in nature, but also show burrowing tendencies, so they are sometimes confused as such. Most will try to flee at first, but persistent provocation may result in a bite or a threat pose. Their bite might be painful, as they probably have medically significant venom.
