= Neoheterophrictus amboli =

Scientific classification
- Kingdom: Animalia
- Phylum: Arthropoda
- Subphylum: Chelicerata
- Class: Arachnida
- Order: Araneae
- Infraorder: Mygalomorphae
- Family: Theraphosidae
- Genus: Neoheterophrictus
- Species: N. amboli

Binomial name
- Neoheterophrictus amboli Mirza & Sanap. 2014

Species of spider

Neoheterophrictus amboli is a species of theraphosid spiders, which is found in India.

== Etymology ==
The specific name of this species, amboli, comes from the type locality, Amboli.

== Distinguishing features ==
N. amboli has a swelling in the sub-apical segment of the primary tibial apophysis, which abruptly terminates into a blunt tubercle, and has a long spine in the basal segments. On the secondary tibial apophysis, there is a stout, short spine.
