= Neoheterophrictus sahyadri =

Scientific classification
- Kingdom: Animalia
- Phylum: Arthropoda
- Subphylum: Chelicerata
- Class: Arachnida
- Order: Araneae
- Infraorder: Mygalomorphae
- Family: Theraphosidae
- Genus: Neoheterophrictus
- Species: N. sahyadri

Binomial name
- Neoheterophrictus sahyadri Siliwal, Gupta & Raven

Species of spider

Neoheterophrictus sahyadri is a spider species in the genus Neoheterophrictus. It was first described in 2012 by Manju Siliwal, Neha Gupta, and Robert John Raven. Its name "sahyadri" comes from the vernacular name for the Western Ghats, a mountain range in India where it was discovered.

== Characteristics ==
The female is characterized by short and very stout spermathecae receptacles (2×) with 6-7 large contiguous lobes and black-green bodies. The male is characterized by the presence of a thick spine on the tibial spur, the palp embolus gently curving retrolaterally towards the tip, and the completely white metatarsi and tarsi on all of the legs. The white is brighter on anterior than posterior tarsi.
