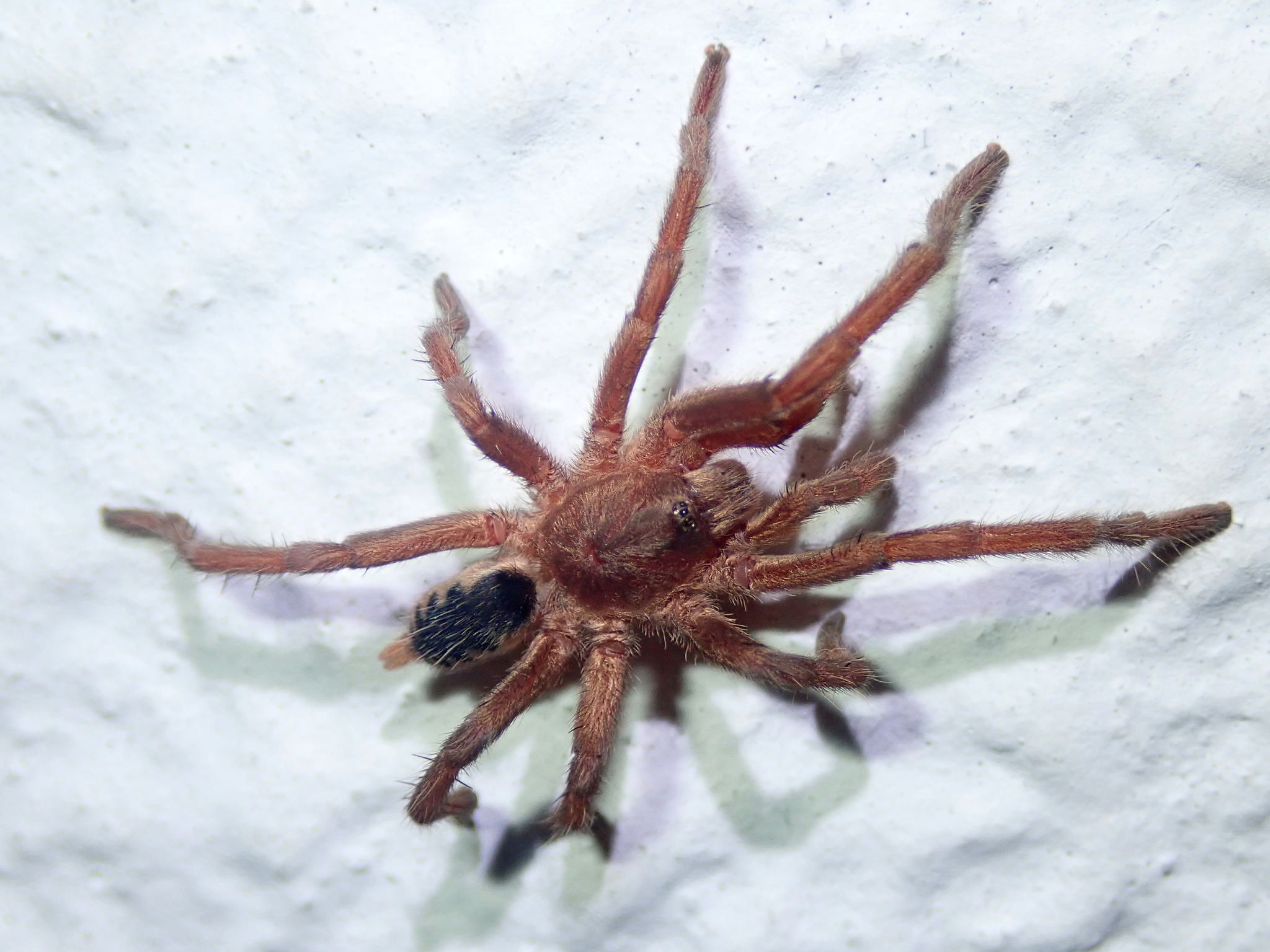

Scientific classification
- Kingdom: Animalia
- Phylum: Arthropoda
- Subphylum: Chelicerata
- Class: Arachnida
- Order: Araneae
- Infraorder: Mygalomorphae
- Family: Theraphosidae
- Genus: Guyruita
- Species: G. cerrado

Binomial name
- Guyruita cerrado Guadanucci, Lucas, Indicatti & Yamamoto, 2007

= Guyruita cerrado =

Species of Arachnida

Guyruita cerrado is a species of spider in the genus Guyruita, described by José P.L. Guadanucci, Sylvia M. Lucas, Rafael P. Indicatti and Flávio U. Yamamoto. It is named for the Cerrado, also known as Brazilian savanna. Guyruita is from the Tupi language and means "to go underneath rocks". It has been seen in central and northern Brazil, specifically Goiás, Maranhão, Pará, Piauí and Tocantins.
