= Catumiri =

Scientific classification
- Kingdom: Animalia
- Phylum: Arthropoda
- Subphylum: Chelicerata
- Class: Arachnida
- Order: Araneae
- Infraorder: Mygalomorphae
- Family: Theraphosidae
- Genus: Catumiri; Guadanucci, 2004

Type species
- C. petropolium Guadanucci, 2004

Species
- 5, see text

Genus of spiders

Catumiri is a genus of South American tarantulas that was first described by J. P. L. Guadanucci in 2004. The name is derived from the Tupi "Catumiri", meaning "very small".

== Description ==
Members of Catumiri have a labium that is much wider than long, and also houses few cuspules along with the maxillae. The anterior scopula is divided by setae, and the spermathecae of females only have one lobe/terminus. There is a row of spines on the prolateral region of the tarsal claw of males.

== Species ==
As of December 2019 it contains 5 species, found in Uruguay, Brazil, Argentina, and Chile:

- Catumiri argentinense (Mello-Leitão, 1941) – Chile, Argentina
- Catumiri chicaoi Guadanucci, 2004 – Brazil
- Catumiri parvum (Keyserling, 1878) – Brazil, Uruguay
- Catumiri petropolium Guadanucci, 2004 (type) – Brazil
- Catumiri sapucai (Nicoletta, Panchuk, Peralta-Seen & Ferretti, 2022) – Argentina

In synonymy:

- C. uruguayense Guadanucci, 2004 = Catumiri parvum (Keyserling, 1878)
