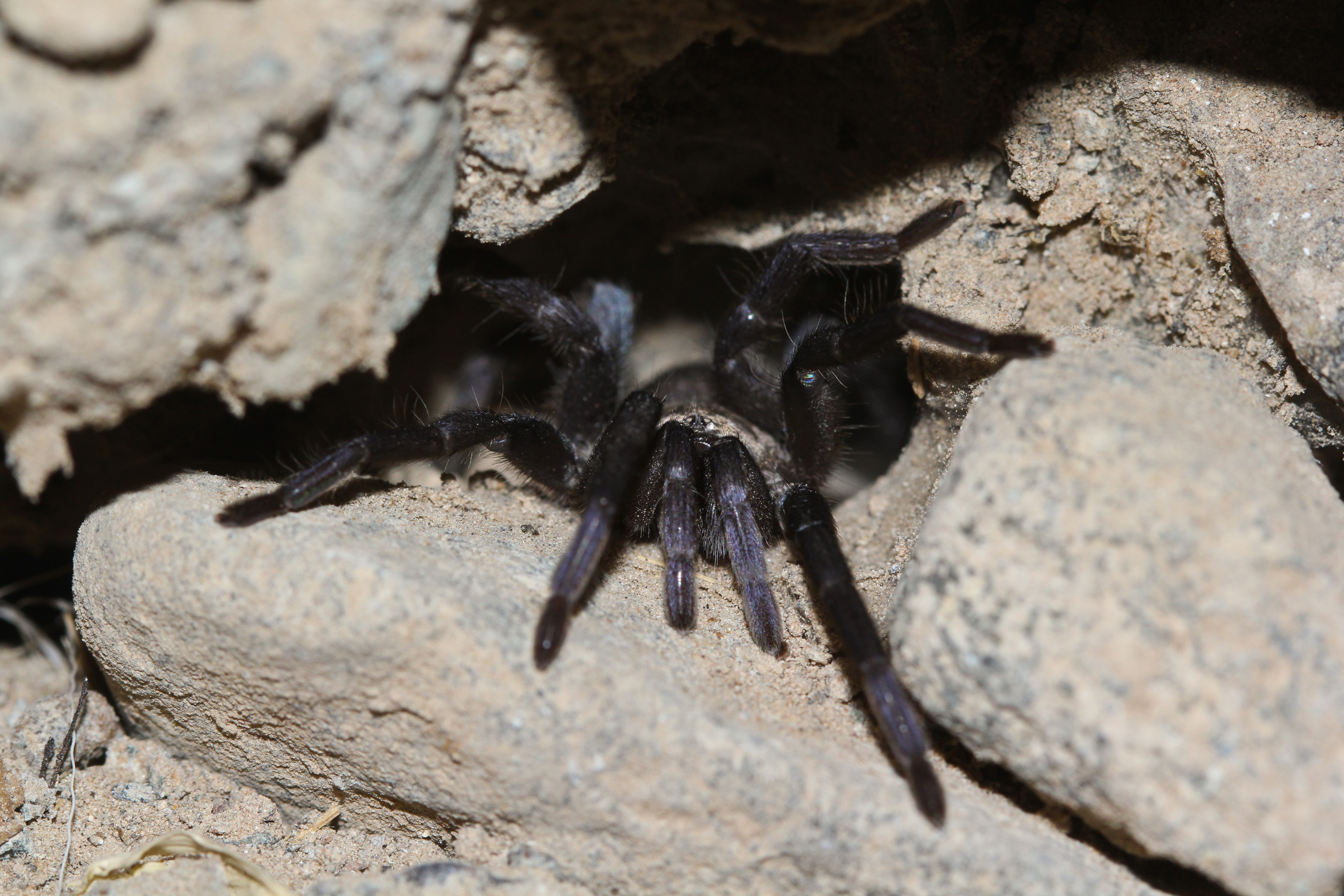
- From the United Arab Emirates

Scientific classification
- Kingdom: Animalia
- Phylum: Arthropoda
- Subphylum: Chelicerata
- Class: Arachnida
- Order: Araneae
- Infraorder: Mygalomorphae
- Family: Theraphosidae
- Genus: Ischnocolus
- Species: I. jickelii

Binomial name
- Ischnocolus jickelii L. Koch, 1875

Synonyms
- Chaetopelma adenense Simon, 1890

= Ischnocolus jickelii =

Species of spider

Ischnocolus jickelii is a small, old-world tarantula. It is found in Aden, Djibouti, Ethiopia, the United Arab Emirates and Somalia. It was first described by Ludwig Koch in 1875. In 1890, French arachnologist Eugène Simon described Chaetopelma adenense. In 2008, José Guadanucci and Richard C. Gallon decided that these were the same species, making Simon's Chaetopelma adenense a synonym.
