= F. H. Gravely =

British entomologist

Frederic Henry Gravely

Superintendent of the Government Museum, Chennai and Connemara Public Library
- In office 1920–1940
- Preceded by: John Robertson Henderson
- Succeeded by: A. Aiyappan

Personal details
- Born: 1885
- Died: 1965 (aged 79–80)
- Profession: arachnologist, entomologist, zoologist, archaeologist

Frederic Henry Gravely (7 December 1885 – 1965) was an eminent British arachnologist, entomologist, botanist, zoologist and student of archaeology, who conducted pioneering research and wrote extensively on various subjects during his tenure at the Indian Museum, Calcutta, and the Government Museum, Madras.

== Early life ==
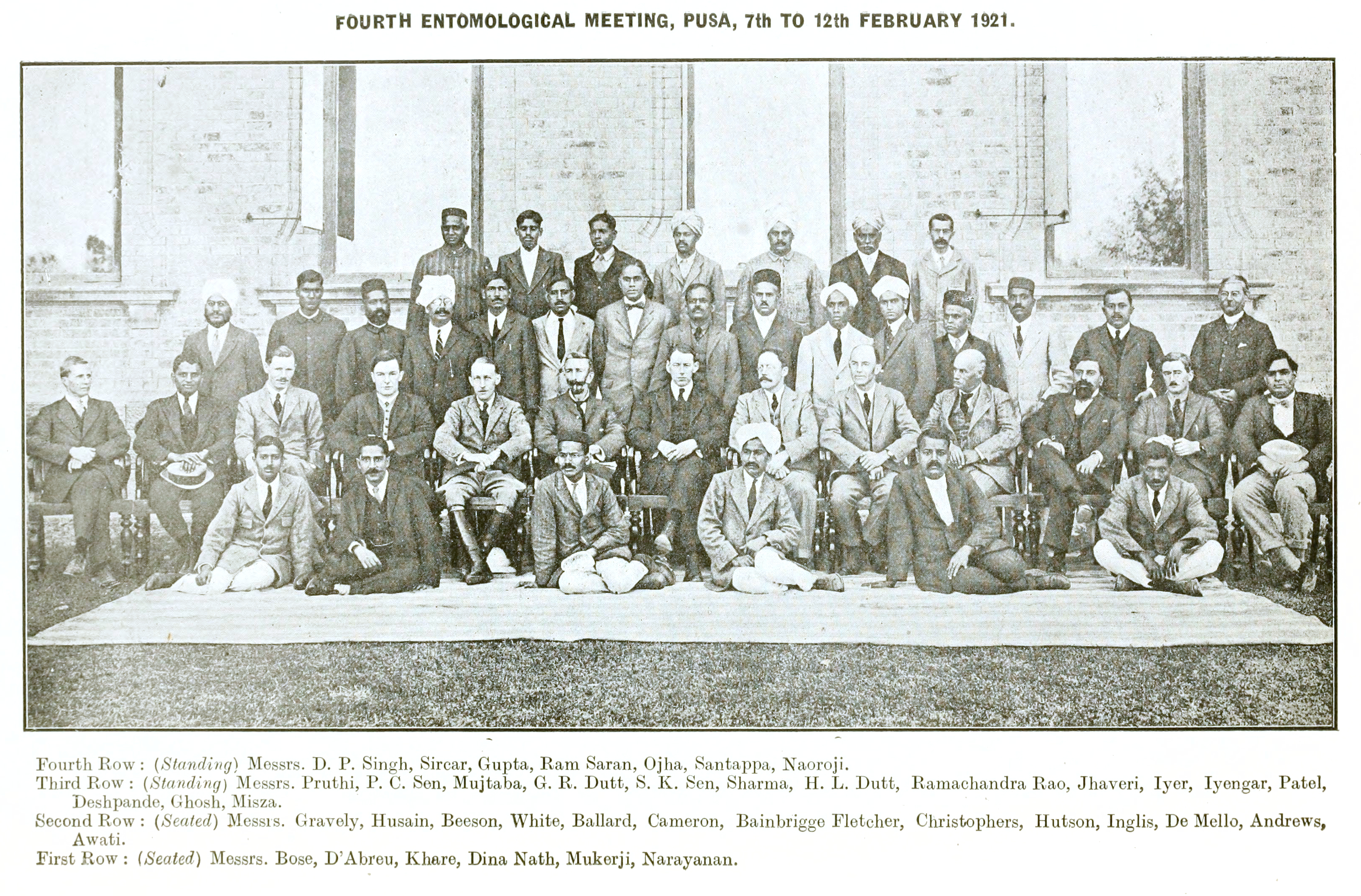
F.H. Gravely in 1921 (seated on chair, left most)

Gravely was born in 1885 in Wellingborough, Northamptonshire, England to Arthur Frederic Gravely and Margaret Hutchinson, the eldest of four children. The family were Quakers and although the father was a businessman, he was interested in natural history. His mother came from a farming family which also produced Sir Jonathan Hutchinson. At the age of nine he moved to a boarding school in Sheffield. He then studied at Ackworth and Bootham (both Quaker schools) before moving to Manchester University to study zoology.

== Indian Museum, Calcutta ==
Gravely graduated in 1906 and became a demonstrator at Manchester in 1907. He was elected to membership of the Manchester Literary and Philosophical Society on 15 October 1907 and gave his address as Natural History Dept., Indian Museum, Calcutta. He worked on collections made in the "Discovery" Antarctic Expedition along with S.J. Hickson and worked on Polychaete Larvae. In 1909 he was appointed Assistant Superintendent of the Indian Museum Calcutta. In 1914, still at Calcutta, he received his D.Sc. for the work on the Oriental Passalidae. He unified the monographs of early observers with the notes of Arrow and Zang to bring to the oriental passalids (1914), and the family itself in general (1918), the classification that is in vogue today with minor alterations.

== Government Museum, Madras ==
Dr. Gravely became the Superintendent of the Government Museum of Madras in 1920. Over the next two decades, he undertook the investigation of the littoral fauna of Krusadai Island, Gulf of Mannar, revived the Bulletin of the museum, and embarked on the scientific preservation, study and interpretation of the museum's collections. His work on Arachnida and Mollusca significantly enhanced the collections of the museum in the two zoological groups. He was also responsible for enlarging the reserve collection, particularly of Invertebrates.

Dr. Gravely contributed to the overall development of the museum as well. He, along with the Curator Dr. C. Sivaramamurti, ensured in 1938 that the antiquities and industrial art collected by the museum was organized effectively, into a collection that exists even today. The most important of Dr. Gravely's many contributions to the subject was the monograph he collaborated on with T. N. Ramachandran (Curator of Archaeology 1925–1935) on the scientific basis for identifying the period of metal images. Dr. Gravely also donated a variety of sculptures, carvings and bronzes to other institutions, including the Prince of Wales Museum, the Lucknow Museum and Dr. Ananda Coomaraswami's Museum in Boston. Dr. Gravely, and P V Mayuranathan considerably enhanced the Herbarium and the botanical collections of the museum.

Dr. Gravely pioneered the preservation of bronzes collected by the museum. He initiated the electrolytic restoration process which has helped preserve not only bronze objects, but also ethnological, pre-historic and numismatic collections. He also built a separate Chemical Conservation Laboratory, the only one of its kind at the time, in 1937.

== Other contributions ==
He was one of the Foundation Fellows of the National Institute of Sciences of India, now the apex scientific body in the country, Indian National Science Academy. He also served as the Secretary to the Asiatic Society in the period 1915–18. His insect and spider collection is in the Indian Museum, Calcutta. It notably contain insects, Arachnida and Myriapoda from limestone caves in Burma (1911), and oriental Passalidae.

== Personal life ==
In 1925 he married Laura Balling and they had a daughter Ann Margaret (born 1928) and a son John Frederic (born 1931). He supported the Toc H of which the first Indian branch was set up in the "Museum House".

== Bibliography ==
- Hydroid Zoophytes (F. H. Gravely and S. J. Hickson), Natural History Journal, 1907
- Hydrozoa, Proceedings and Transactions of the Liverpool Biological Society Vol XXII, 1908
- Notes on the habits and distribution of Limnocnida indica (F. H. Gravely and S. P. Agharkar), 1912
- Three genera of Papuan passalid Coleoptera, Journal of the Zoological Museum Hamburg, XXX, 1913
- Limestone caves of Burma and the Malay Peninsula (F. H. Gravely, N. Annandale and B. J. Coggin), Proceedings of the Asiatic Society of Bengal IX, 1913
- Account of the oriental Passalidae (Coleoptera), Memoirs of the Indian Museum, III, 1914
- Notes on the habits of Indian insects, myriapods and arachnids, Records of the Indian Museum Calcutta II, 1915
- Notes on Indian mygalomorph Spiders, Records of the Indian Museum Calcutta II, 1915
- Contribution to the revision of the Passalidae of the World, Memoirs of the Indian Museum VII, 1918
- A note on the marine invertebrate fauna of Chandipore, Orissa, 1919
- The spiders and scorpions of Barkuda Island, Records of the Indian Museum XXII, 1921
- Some Indian spiders of the subfamily Tetragnathinae, Records of the Indian Museum XXII, 1921
- Common Indian spiders, Journal of the Bombay Natural History Society XXVIII, 1922
- Some Indian spiders of the family Lycosidae, Records of the Indian Museum XXVI, 1924
- The Arachnida and Insecta sections (The littoral fauna of Krusadai Island), Bulletin of Madras Government Museum, 1927
- Section on Orders Gymnoblastea and Calyptoblastea (The littoral fauna of Krusadai Island), Bulletin of Madras Government Museum, 1927
- The Indian Species of the Genus Caralluma, Family : Asclepiadaceae, (F. H. Gravely and P. V. Mayuranathan), 1931
- Some Indian spiders of the families Ctenidae, Sparassidae, Selenopidae and Clubionidae, Records of the Indian Museum XXXIII, 1931
- Catalogue of Hindu Metal Images in the Government Museum, Madras (F. H. Gravely and T. N. Ramachandran), 1932
- The Three Main Styles of Temple Architecture Recognised by Silpa Sastras (F. H. Gravely and T. N. Ramachandran), 1934
- An Outline of Indian Temple Architecture, 1936
- An Introduction to South Indian Temple Architecture and Sculptures (F. H. Gravely and C. Sivaramamurti), 1939
- Illustrations of Indian Sculptures Mostly Southern (F. H. Gravely and C. Sivaramamurti), 1939
- Shells and Other Animal Remains Found on the Madras Beach, Vol I, 1941
- Shells and Other Animal Remains Found on the Madras Beach, Vol II, 1942
- Guide to the Archaeological Galleries (F. H. Gravely and C. Sivaramamurti), 1947
- The Gopuras of Thiruvannamalai, 1959
- Notes on Hindu Images (F. H. Gravely and C. Sivaramamurti), 1977
