= Nesiergus =

Scientific classification
- Kingdom: Animalia
- Phylum: Arthropoda
- Subphylum: Chelicerata
- Class: Arachnida
- Order: Araneae
- Infraorder: Mygalomorphae
- Family: Theraphosidae
- Genus: Nesiergus; Simon, 1903

Type species
- N. insulanus Simon, 1903

Species
- N. gardineri (Hirst, 1911) – Seychelles; N. halophilus Benoit, 1978 – Seychelles; N. insulanus Simon, 1903 – Seychelles

Genus of spiders

Nesiergus is a genus of Seychelloise tarantulas that was first described by Eugène Louis Simon in 1903. As of May 2020 it contains three species, found on the Seychelles: N. gardineri, N. halophilus, and N. insulanus.
