= Sahydroaraneus =

Scientific classification
- Kingdom: Animalia
- Phylum: Arthropoda
- Subphylum: Chelicerata
- Class: Arachnida
- Order: Araneae
- Infraorder: Mygalomorphae
- Family: Theraphosidae
- Genus: Sahydroaraneus; Sanap

Species
- Sahydroaraneus collinus (Pocock, 1899); Sahydroaraneus hirsti Mirza & Sanap, 2014; Sahydroaraneus raja (Gravely, 1915); Sahydroaraneus sebastiani (Sunil Jose, 2017)

Genus of spiders

Sahydroaraneus is a genus of spiders in the family Theraphosidae. It is found in India and was first described in 2014 by Mirza & Sanap.

== Species ==
As of 2023, it contains 4 species, all in India.

1. Sahydroaraneus collinus - Pocock, 1899
2. Sahydroaraneus hirsti - Mirza & Sanap, 2014
3. Sahydroaraneus raja - (Gravely, 1915)
4. Sahydroaraneus sebastiani - Sunil Jose, 2017

== Description ==
They are hirsute, featuring long setae on the fourth tarsi. They have thick black setae on the dorsal surface of the chelicerae. The primary tibial apophysis consists of a basal stalk, from which arises a thin, elongated black spine. A secondary tibial apophysis is absent.

== Behaviour and Ecology ==
They usually live in moist deciduous forests under rocks or decaying logs and make a horizontal tubular network of webs for retreat. They remain hidden during the daytime and forage during night.
