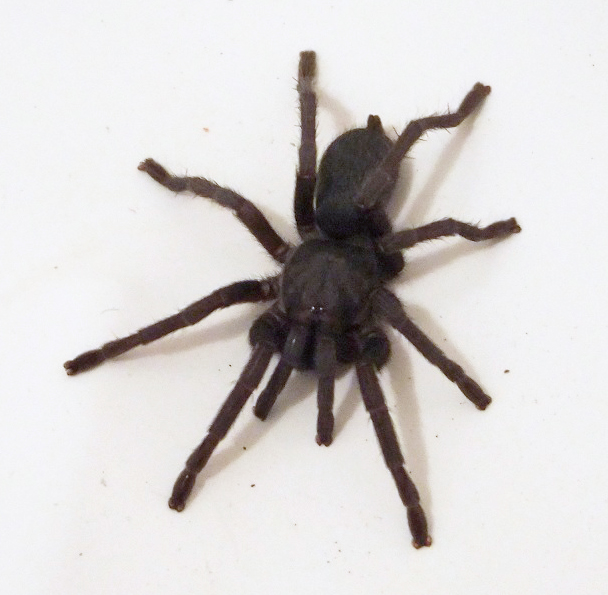

Conservation status
- Least Concern (IUCN 3.1)

Scientific classification
- Kingdom: Animalia
- Phylum: Arthropoda
- Subphylum: Chelicerata
- Class: Arachnida
- Order: Araneae
- Infraorder: Mygalomorphae
- Family: Theraphosidae
- Genus: Chaetopelma
- Species: C. olivaceum

Binomial name
- Chaetopelma olivaceum (C. L. Koch, 1841)

Synonyms
- Mygale olivacea C. L. Koch, 1841; Ischnocolus gracilis Ausserer, 1871; Ischnocolus syriacus Ausserer, 1871; Chaetopelma aegyptiaca Ausserer, 1871; Avicularia tetramera Simon, 1873; Avicularia striatocauda Simon, 1873; Nemesia concolor Simon, 1873; Ischnocolus striatocauda (Simon, 1873); Cratorrhagus tetramera (Simon, 1873); Cratorrhagus tetramerus Reimoser, 1919; Chaetopelma shabati Hassan, 1950; Cratorrhagus tetrameris Bonnet, 1956; Chaetopelma adenense Smith, 1990; Chaetopelma aegyptiacum Smith, 1990; Ischnocolus jerusalemensis Smith, 1990; Chaetopelma anatolicum Schmidt & Smith, 1995; Chaetopelma gracile Vollmer, 1997

= Chaetopelma olivaceum =

Species of spider

Chaetopelma olivaceum is a species of mygalomorph spider, belonging to the tarantula family (Theraphosidae). It has many synonyms, including Ischnocolus jerusalemensis. Common names used include black furry, black tarantula and Middle East gold.

== Range and habitat ==
The species is found in Cyprus, Turkey, Sudan, Egypt and the Middle East.

== Description ==
The body length is approximately 2.5 cm for adult males and 5 cm or larger for females. It is one of the largest spiders in Israel. The color varies between black, gray and brown dark; they tend to be paler in the cooler more forested regions of their range and darker in the southern more arid areas.

The body is covered with tiny hairs and is shiny and velvety. There are variations in appearance and size throughout the range. Their food consists of insects and even small mice and young lizards.

The species is sexually dimorphic: the female is larger than the male.

== Behavior ==
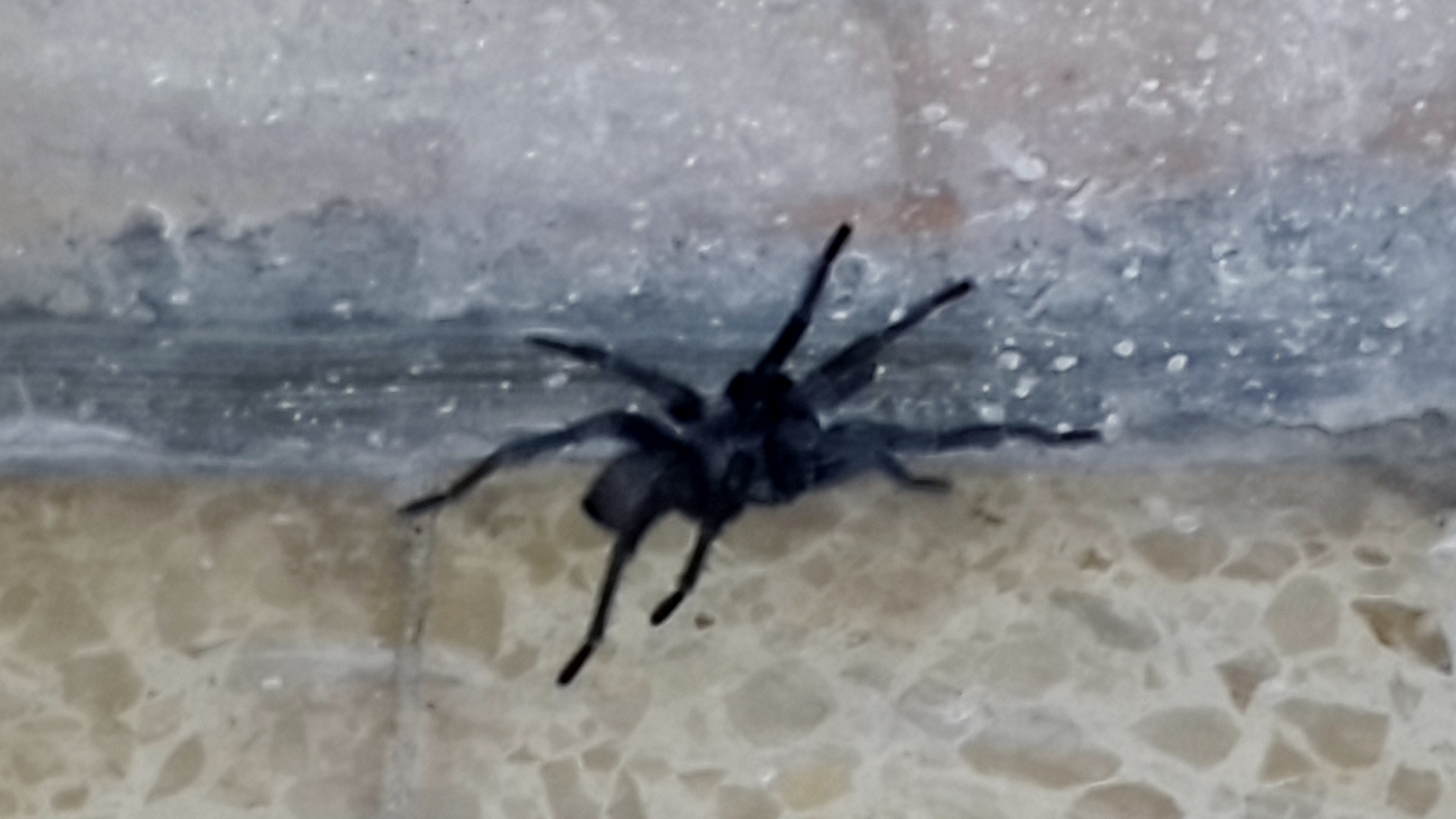
Black furry, Jerusalem, 20151105

The species is active mainly at night. In the wild they can be found hiding under rocks or bark, but may reach human-occupied areas during migrations. When the spider feels threatened, it lifts its front torso, swinging its feet to expose a red stain on its mouth and fangs. If the threat continues the spider will turn and look for a place to hide. C. olivaceum has been reported as living in large colonies and this has been observed in the burial caves around Jerusalem and reported from dried up wells in the Jordan Valley.

== Relation to humans ==
This spider is not considered dangerous to humans and helps eliminate pests such as cockroaches. It is black, furry, fast and aggressive in respect to other types of tarantulas. Bites are unpleasant but mild. They are sometimes kept as pets.

== Predators ==
In Israel two species of spider wasp, Hemipepsis brunnea and Pseudopompilus humboldti, have been recorded as predators on Chaetopelma olivaceum.
