= Heterophrictus =

Scientific classification
- Kingdom: Animalia
- Phylum: Arthropoda
- Subphylum: Chelicerata
- Class: Arachnida
- Order: Araneae
- Infraorder: Mygalomorphae
- Family: Theraphosidae
- Genus: Heterophrictus; Pocock, 1900

Type species
- H. milleti Pocock, 1900

Species
- 4, see text

Genus of spiders

Heterophrictus is a genus of Indian tarantulas that was first described by Reginald Innes Pocock in 1900.

== Species ==
As of March 2020 it contains four species, found in India:

- Heterophrictus aareyensis Mirza & Sanap, 2014 – India
- Heterophrictus blatteri (Gravely, 1935) – India
- Heterophrictus milleti Pocock, 1900 (type) – India
- Heterophrictus raveni Mirza & Sanap, 2014 – India

In synonymy:

- H. mahabaleshwari (Tikader, 1977, Tikader, 1977) = Heterophrictus blatteri (Gravely, 1935)
