= Orphnaecus adamsoni =

Scientific classification
- Kingdom: Animalia
- Phylum: Arthropoda
- Subphylum: Chelicerata
- Class: Arachnida
- Order: Araneae
- Infraorder: Mygalomorphae
- Family: Theraphosidae
- Genus: Orphnaecus
- Species: O. adamsoni

Binomial name
- Orphnaecus adamsoni (Salamanes, Santos, Austria & Villancio, 2022)

Species of tarantula found in Dinagat Islands, Philippines

Orphnaecus adamsoni is a species of tarantula found in the Dinagat Islands, Philippines. It is the fourth member of the genus Orphnaecus found in the country and the fifth overall. It was discovered by a research team of Adamson University in Manila, where it took its name.

== Discovery ==
Orphnaecus adamsoni was discovered by Julius John Salamanes, Jhayson Mark Santos, Eleanor Austria, and Gil Gabriel Villancio (Note: Also affiliated with University of the Philippines Los Baños.) of Adamson University in the province of Dinagat Islands, Philippines. Seven members of the species (three male and four female) were collected in Mt. Magkuno in Loreto and Mt. Arayat in Basilisa and Cagdianao. The team named the species after the university and published their discovery in August 2022 on the open-access journal Biodiversitas.

== Characteristics ==
Salamanes et al. (2022) noted it closely resembles Orphnaecus kwebaburdeos in Polillo Islands, Quezon Province in Luzon. However, it has rounded carapace and shorter leg segments, more clavate paddle-shaped maxillary lyra, and a different habitat. It has a brownish appearance.

== See also ==
- Orphnaecus – genus of this species
  - Orphnaecus philippinus
  - Orphnaecus dichromatus
  - Orphnaecus kwebaburdeos
  - Orphnaecus dichromatus – the only known species of Orphnaecus outside the Philippines
