= Tapinauchenius gigas =

Tapinauchenius gigas is the scientific name of a species of spider. It may refer to:

- Amazonius germani Cifuentes & Bertani, 2022, for which it was misidentified between 1994 and 2022
- Tapinauchenius plumipes (C.L. Koch, 1842), of which it is a synonym
