= Orphnaecus =

Scientific classification
- Kingdom: Animalia
- Phylum: Arthropoda
- Subphylum: Chelicerata
- Class: Arachnida
- Order: Araneae
- Infraorder: Mygalomorphae
- Family: Theraphosidae
- Subfamily: Selenocosmiinae
- Genus: Orphnaecus; Simon, 1892

Type species
- O. pellitus Simon, 1892

Species
- 6, see text

Genus of spiders

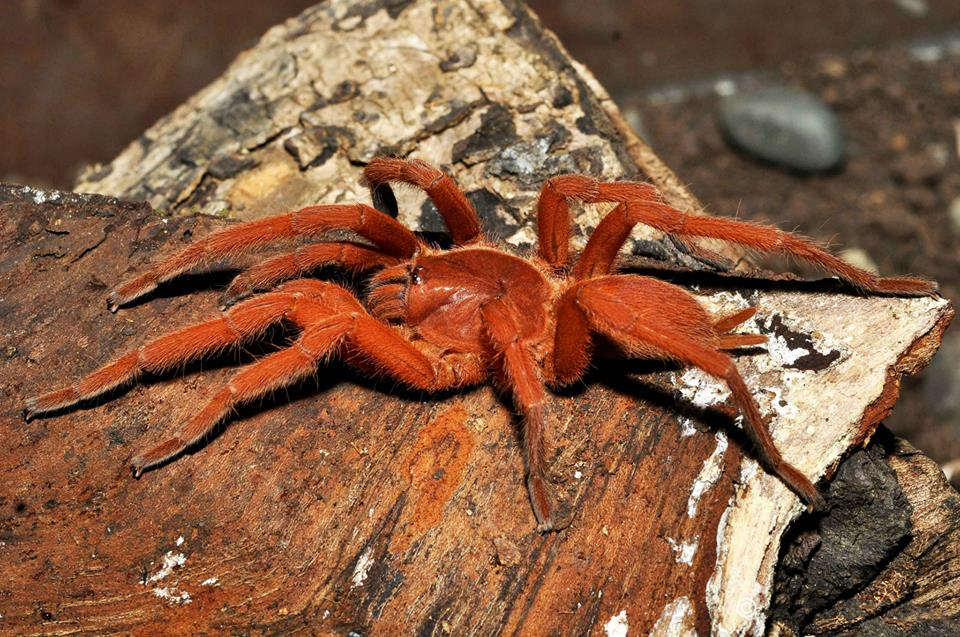
Philippine Orange Tarantula

Orphnaecus is a genus of tarantulas that was first described by Eugène Louis Simon in 1892. They have close to fifty lanceolate stridulatory spines on the chelicerae, known as "strikers". The male embolus has a single strong retrolateral keel. It was considered a senior synonym of Chilocosmia and Selenobrachys; however, more recent studies have found the three genera sufficiently different to remain separate.

== Species ==
As of March 2025 it contains 6 species, all from the Philippines:

- Orphnaecus adamsoni Salamanes, Santos, Austria & Villancio, 2022
- Orphnaecus kwebaburdeos Barrion-Dupo, Barrion & Rasalan, 2015
- Orphnaecus libmanan Acuña et al., 2025
- Orphnaecus mimbilisanensis Sumogat, Acuña & Nuñeza, 2025
- Orphnaecus pellitus Simon, 1892 (type)
- Orphnaecus tangcongvaca Acuña et al., 2025

=== Transferred to other genera ===
- Orphnaecus dichromatus (Schmidt & von Wirth, 1992) → Chilocosmia dichromata
- Orphnaecus philippinus (Schmidt, 1999) → Selenobrachys philippinus
