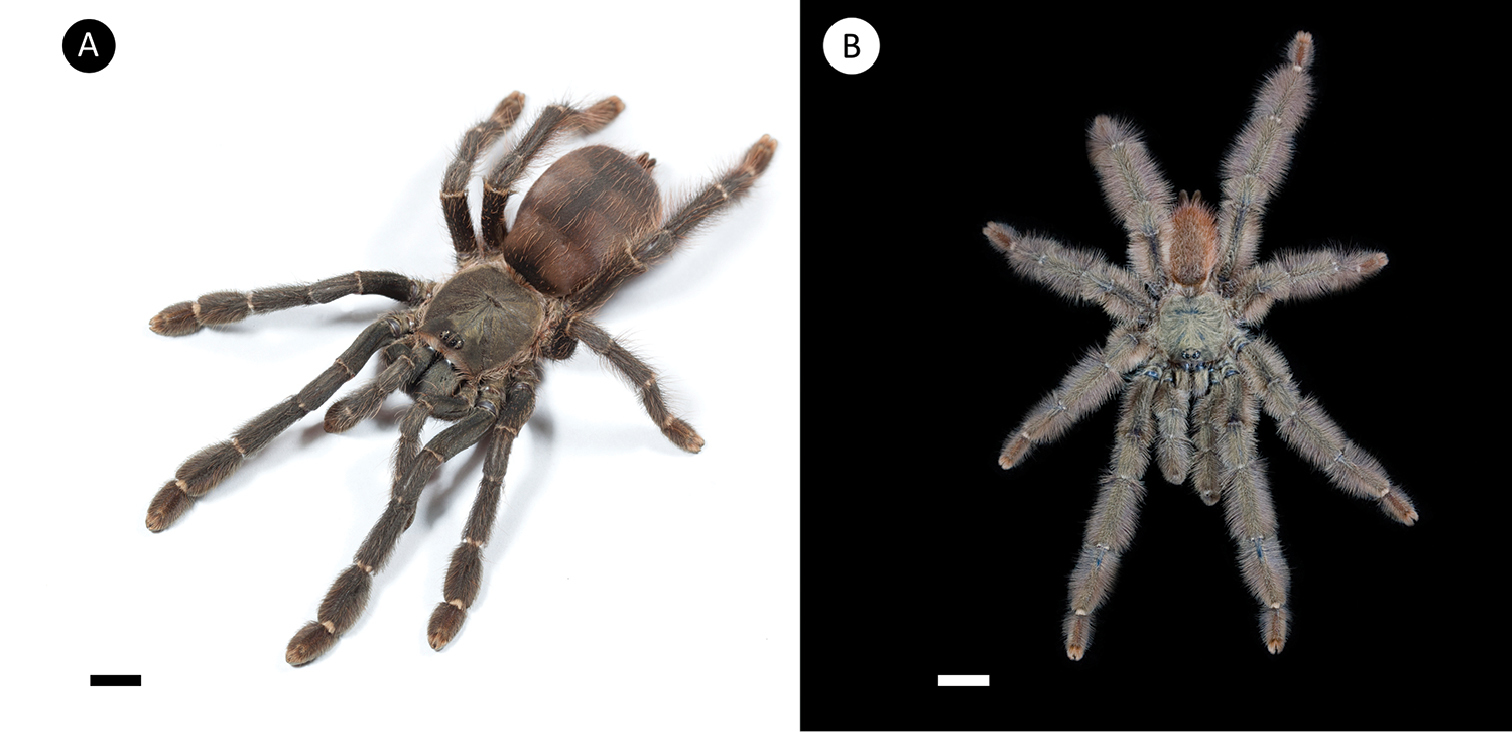
- Amazonius burgessi

Scientific classification
- Kingdom: Animalia
- Phylum: Arthropoda
- Subphylum: Chelicerata
- Class: Arachnida
- Order: Araneae
- Infraorder: Mygalomorphae
- Family: Theraphosidae
- Genus: Amazonius; Cifuentes & Bertani, 2022

Species
- 4, see text.

= Amazonius (spider) =

Genus of spider

Amazonius is a genus of tarantulas first described by Cifuentes and Bertani in 2022. They are found in Venezuela, Colombia, Peru, Ecuador, Brazil and French Guiana. Two of the four species were originally from the Tapinauchenius genus, being A. burgessi and A. elenae. A. germani was misidentified as a species of Tapinauchenius in 1994, a misidentification that was only corrected in 2022.

== Species ==
As of December 2025, it contained four species:

- Amazonius elenae (Schmidt, 1994) – Ecuador, Brazil
- Amazonius germani Cifuentes & Bertani, 2022 – French Guiana, Brazil
- Amazonius giovaninii Cifuentes & Bertani, 2022 – Brazil
- Amazonius subcaeruleus (Bauer & Antonelli, 1997) – Columbia, Ecuador, Venezuela
