= E. foliatus =

E. foliatus may refer to:

- Ephebopus foliatus West et al., 2008, a species of spider in the family Theraphosidae found in Guyana
- Ethobunus foliatus Goodnight & Goodnight, 1983, a species of harvestman in the family Zalmoxidae found in Costa Rica

== See also ==
- Foliatus (disambiguation)
