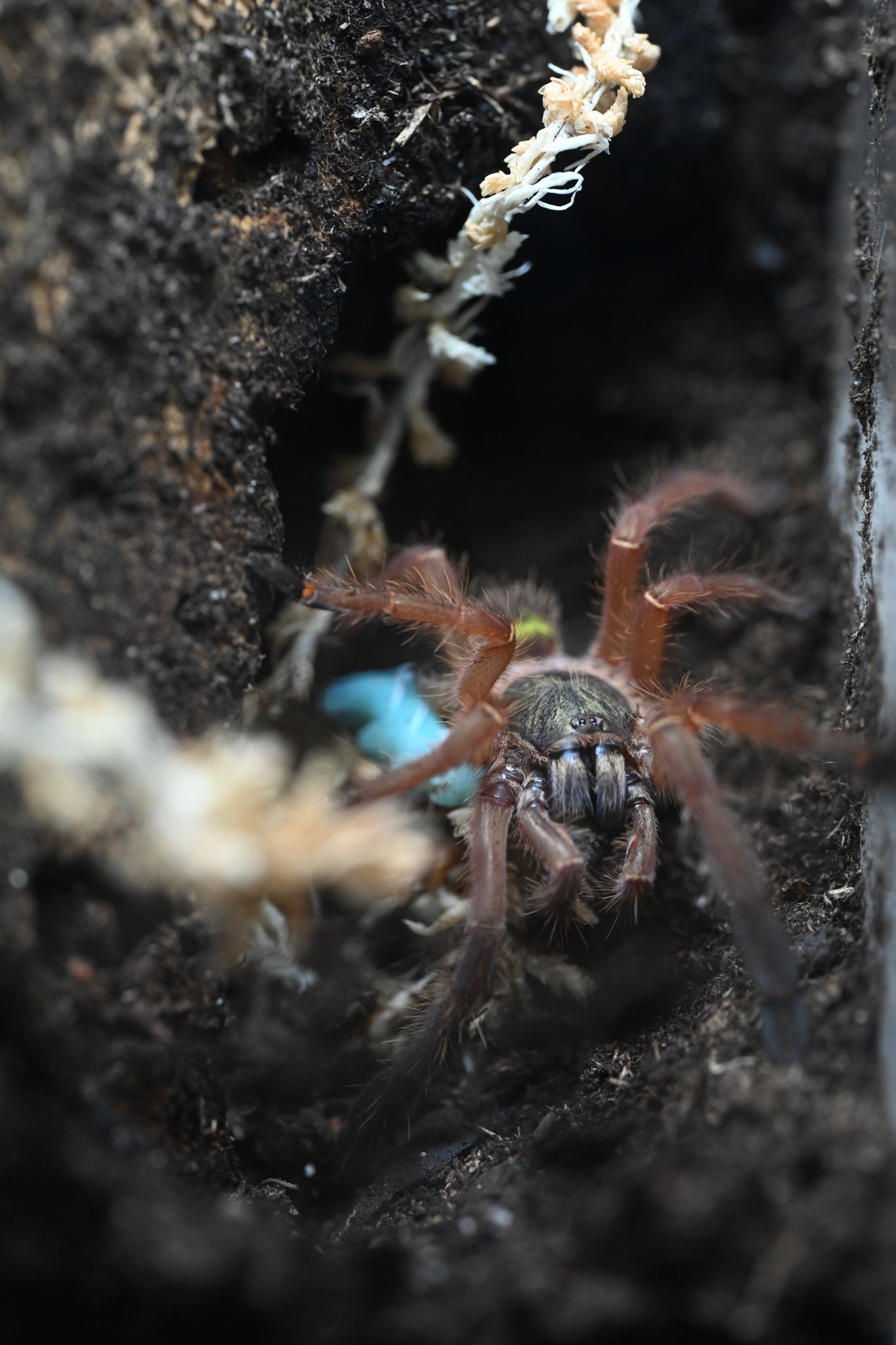

Scientific classification
- Kingdom: Animalia
- Phylum: Arthropoda
- Subphylum: Chelicerata
- Class: Arachnida
- Order: Araneae
- Infraorder: Mygalomorphae
- Family: Theraphosidae
- Genus: Ephebopus
- Species: E. uatuman

Binomial name
- Ephebopus uatuman Lucas, Silva & Bertani, 1992

= Ephebopus uatuman =

Species of spider

Ephebopus uatuman also known as the emerald skeleton tarantula, is a tarantula native to Brazil. It was first described by Lucas, Silva and Bertani in 1992. It is named after the Uatuman River.

== Description ==
Females of this species live for up to 15 years, while males live 2 to 4 years. They grow to be about 10 cm in size, although their namesake emerald color is usually not apparent as it is usually only seen after molts. The carapace and legs are usually a dark amber color, with the abdomen of the same color, but with long reddish hairs. There is also yellow banding between the femora and patella of all legs.

== Identification ==
They can be confused with E. cyanognathus, but they can be distinguished, as this species lacks the iconic blue chelicerae of the blue fang tarantula. They can be distinguished from all others by the coloration in females, and the shape of the genitalia of both sexes.

== Distribution ==
They are found all throughout the Amazonean Region of Brazil, where it remains quite hot and tropical, usually maintaining a temperature of 27 °C (81 °F), although there is a variance between the months. This region also maintains a very high level of humidity, usually over 80%.

== Behavior ==
They are quite skittish, but surprisingly defensive; receiving a bite from this species is not as rare as with most new world tarantulas. They are a fossorial species, generally staying in burrows. They usually make a burrow in the shape of a tub, which is usually covered in leaf litter. These burrows are quite similar to those of E. cyanognathus. The entrance and the leaves are bound together with webbing, and the burrow ends in a chamber which is about 20–40 cm deep.
