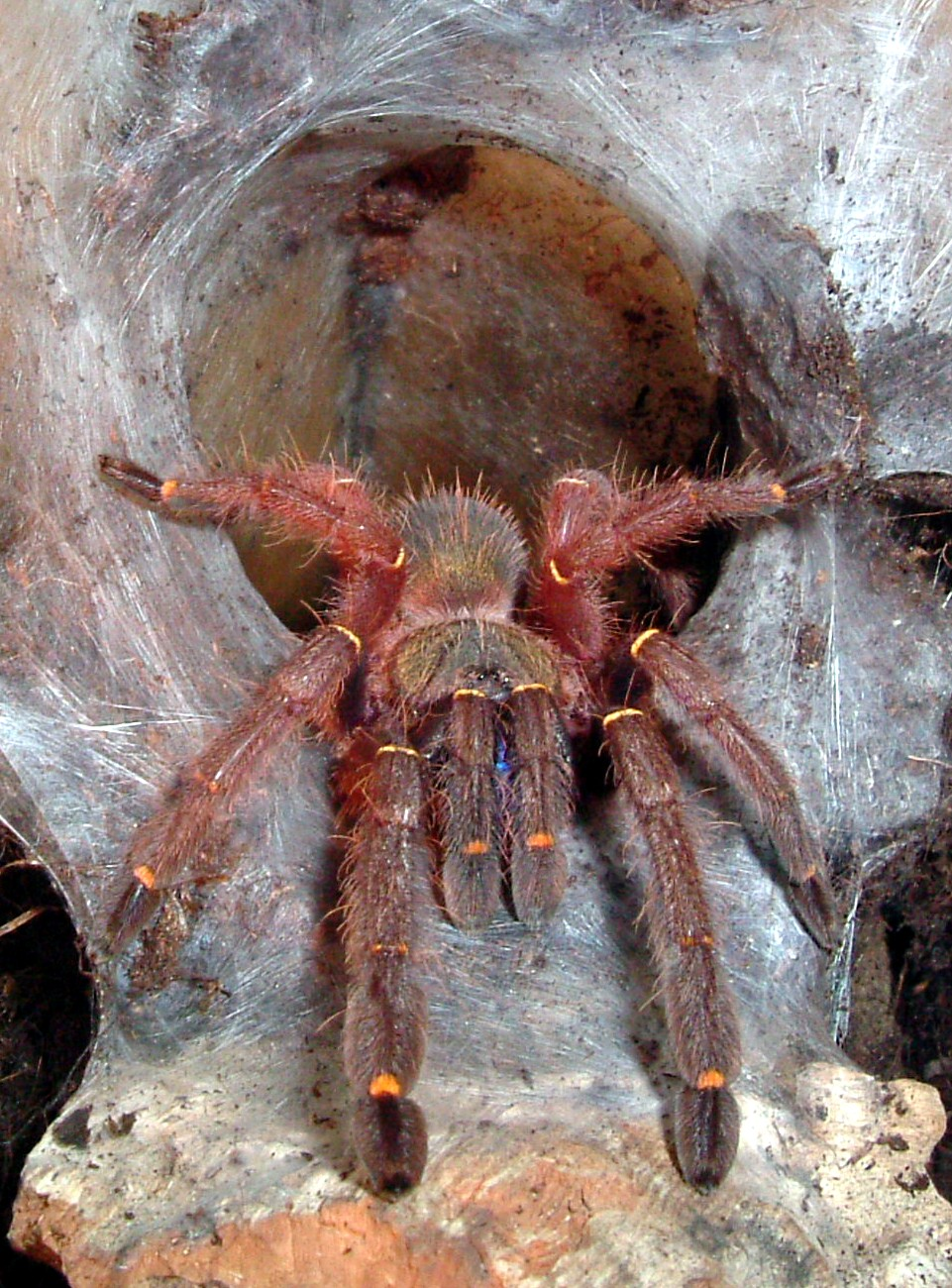

Scientific classification
- Kingdom: Animalia
- Phylum: Arthropoda
- Subphylum: Chelicerata
- Class: Arachnida
- Order: Araneae
- Infraorder: Mygalomorphae
- Family: Theraphosidae
- Genus: Ephebopus
- Species: E. cyanognathus

Binomial name
- Ephebopus cyanognathus West & Marshall, 2000

= Ephebopus cyanognathus =

Species of spider

Ephebopus cyanognathus, known as the blue fang tarantula, is a species of tarantula (family Theraphosidae). It is endemic to French Guiana. It was first described by Rick C. West and Samuel D Marshall in 2000, and is somewhat commonly kept as pets. As it common name may suggest, they have magnificent blue chelicerae, cyano meaning blue and gnathus meaning jaw. This tarantula is a burrowing spider, though spiderlings of this species have been observed to be semi-arboreal.

== Description ==
This tarantula looks a lot like the Ephebopus uatuman tarantula, with the main distinguishing feature being the blue chelicerae, though these are lacking in adult males. Adult males are instead a purplish color, and can be distinguished by their palpal bulb. This tarantula has bright golden rings on its legs and pedipalps, which are evident at segments. In adults, the carapace is brown in color with some areas showing a greenish hue. Its opisthosoma is mainly dark brown with a greenish stripe in the center.

Juveniles and spiderlings (slings) have legs that are pinkish to the metatarsus, which is purple in color. The carapace is completely brown in slings, with juveniles having some greenish coloration developing between the brown. While a sling, the opisthosoma is green with a thick yellow line in the center. Juveniles also have this yellow line, though its duller, and the opisthosoma is a greenish-brown.

== Habitat ==
These tarantulas are found all over French Guiana, from Trésor Reserve all the way to Saül. The Trésor Reserve receives an annual average of about 4 m of rain because of the trade winds, which are loaded with humidity from the ocean, a minimum temperature of 23 °C, and very high humidity.

== Behavior ==
This spider is mainly fossorial, but juveniles have been observed to oddly be semi arboreal. When they are young they are known to be defensive, and very nervous, but this gets better with age. When provoked this tarantula will first try to flee, but under persistent provocation it will throw hairs or bite. This tarantula will make burrows, though not as deep as other spiders, making the entrance stronger with whatever they may find, popping of a few centimeters of the surface.
