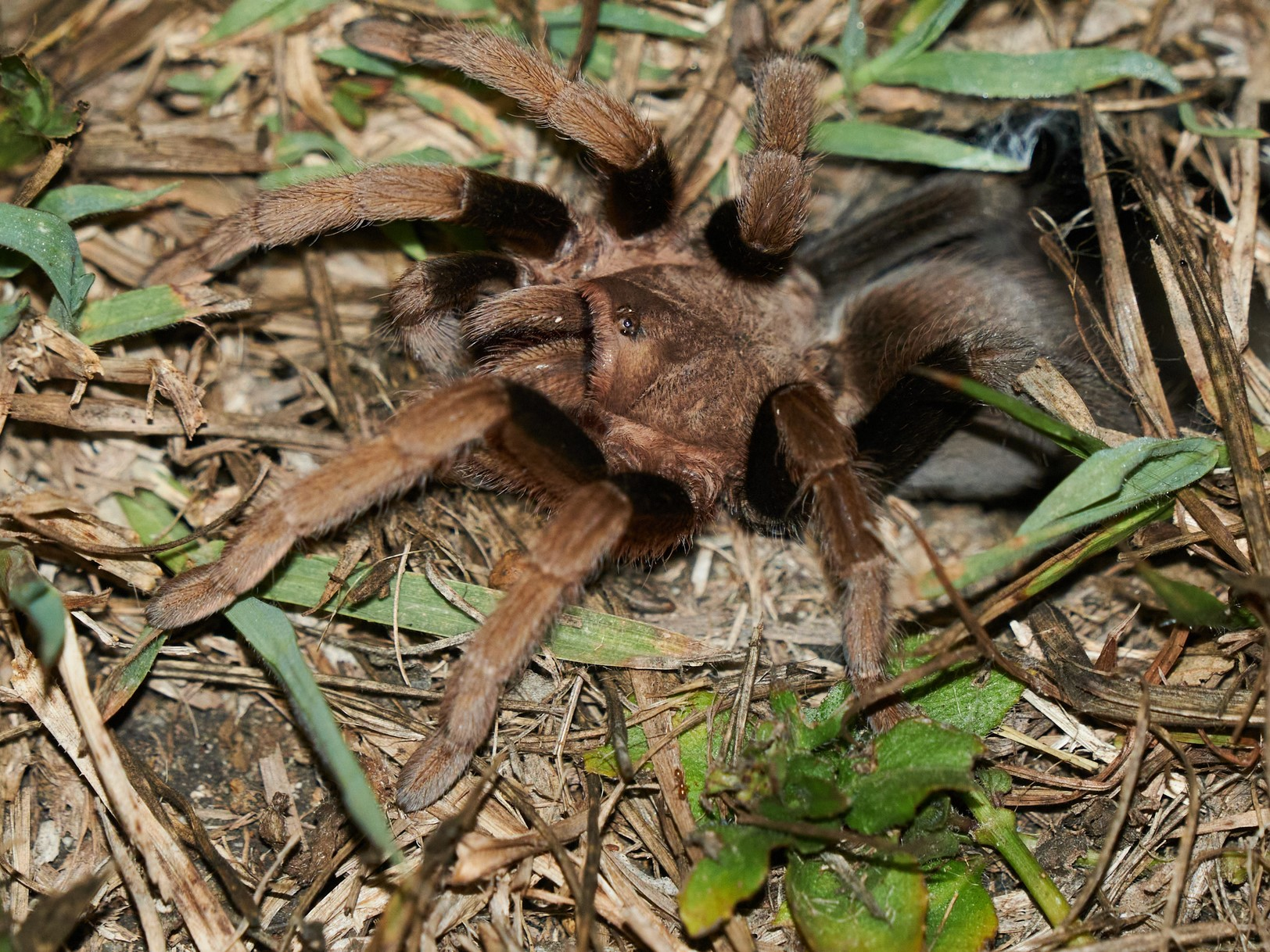
- Crassicrus lamanai

Scientific classification
- Kingdom: Animalia
- Phylum: Arthropoda
- Subphylum: Chelicerata
- Class: Arachnida
- Order: Araneae
- Infraorder: Mygalomorphae
- Family: Theraphosidae
- Genus: Crassicrus; Reichling & West, 1996

Type species
- C. lamanai Reichling & West, 1996

Species
- 6, see text

= Crassicrus =

Genus of spiders

Crassicrus is a genus of Central and South American tarantulas that was first described by S. B. Reichling & R. C. West in 1996.

== Species ==
As of March 2020 it contains six species, found in Belize, Guatemala, and Mexico:

- Crassicrus bidxigui Candia-Ramírez & Francke, 2017 – Mexico
- Crassicrus cocona Candia-Ramírez & Francke, 2017 – Mexico
- Crassicrus lamanai Reichling & West, 1996 (type) – Guatemala, Belize
- Crassicrus stoicum (Chamberlin, 1925) – Mexico
- Crassicrus tochtli Candia-Ramírez & Francke, 2017 – Mexico
- Crassicrus yumkimil Candia-Ramírez & Francke, 2017 – Mexico
