= Lyrognathus fuscus =

Scientific classification
- Kingdom: Animalia
- Phylum: Arthropoda
- Subphylum: Chelicerata
- Class: Arachnida
- Order: Araneae
- Infraorder: Mygalomorphae
- Family: Theraphosidae
- Genus: Lyrognathus
- Species: L. fuscus

Binomial name
- Lyrognathus fuscus West & Nunn, 2010

Species of spider

Lyrognathus fuscus is a theraphosid spider species in the genus Lyrognathus, found in Borneo. The scientific name for the species was first published in 2010 by West and Nunn.
