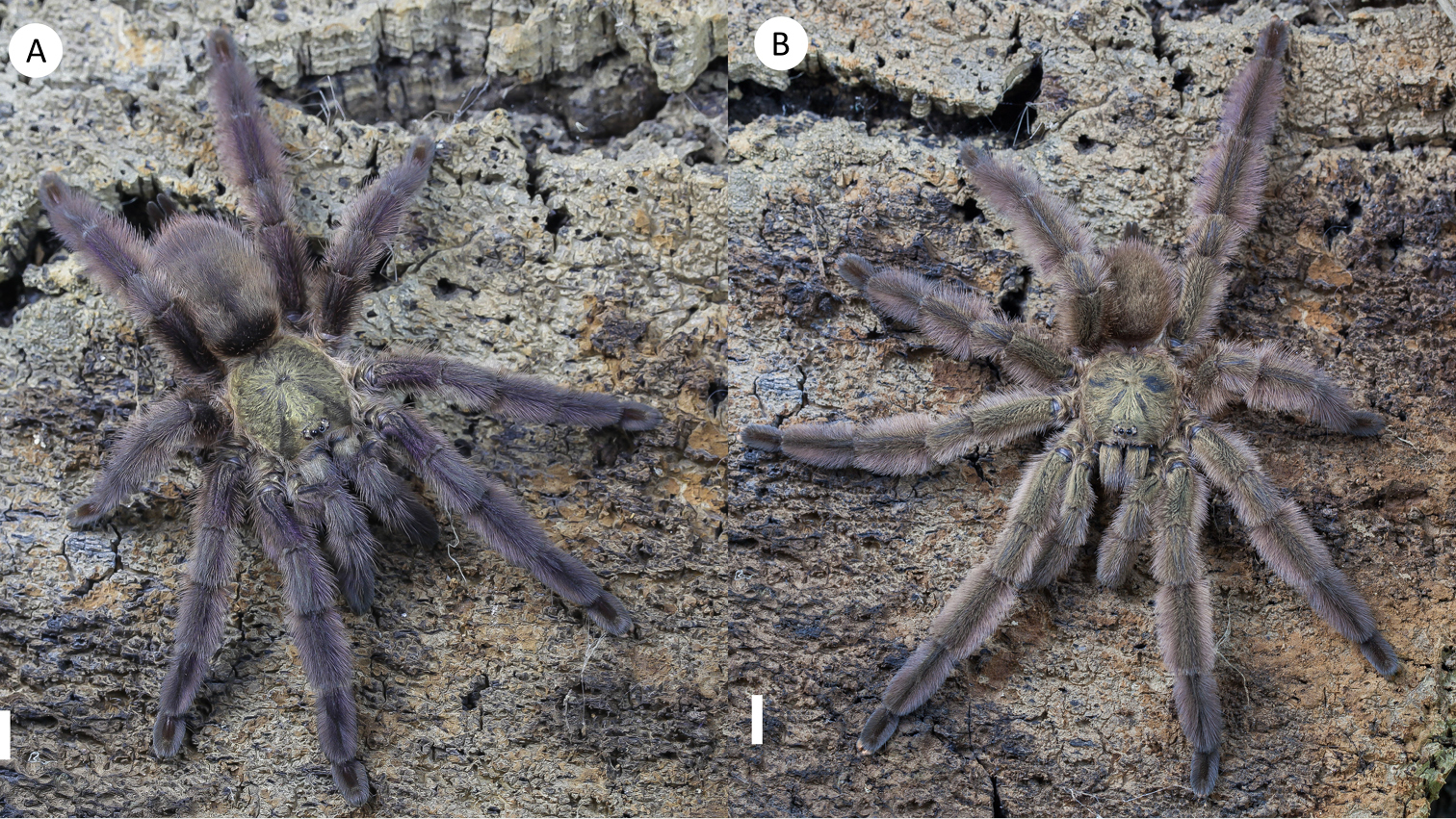
- Tapinauchenius rasti. A female (A), and male (B)

Scientific classification
- Kingdom: Animalia
- Phylum: Arthropoda
- Subphylum: Chelicerata
- Class: Arachnida
- Order: Araneae
- Infraorder: Mygalomorphae
- Family: Theraphosidae
- Genus: Tapinauchenius
- Species: T. rasti

Binomial name
- Tapinauchenius rasti Hüsser, 2018

= Tapinauchenius rasti =

Species of arachnid

Tapinauchenius rasti is one of the nine recognized species within the genus Tapinauchenius. It was formally described in 2018 from specimens, both male and female, collected on Union Island, part of St. Vincent and the Grenadines in the Lesser Antilles.

== Distribution ==
This species is endemic to Union Island in Saint Vincent and the Grenadines. Currently, T. rasti is only known from Union Island, though the true diversity and distribution of endemic Tapinauchenius species across the Windward Islands in the Caribbean remain an open question requiring further investigation.

== Description ==
As with other species of Tapinauchenius, males and females of Tapinauchenius rasti are distinguished from those of Ephebopus Simon, 1892 by lacking an urticating setae pad on the prolateral distal femur of the palp, and from Psalmopoeus Pocock, 1895 and Amazonius Cifuentes and Bertani, 2022 by lacking a maxillary lyra.

Females of Tapinauchenius rasti resemble those of T. plumipes, T. cupreus, T. latipes, and T. polybotes .

Males of T. rasti resemble those of T. polybotes by having a short embolus that is less than 2.7 times the subtegulum length, but they differ from T. polybotes by lacking a sinuous curvature at the embolus tip.

Hüsser (2018) reported that adult T. rasti specimens were typically found on larger, older trees, utilizing cavities and "knot holes" as retreats, which were lined with silk around the entrance. One subadult was observed under loose bark. Subadults were also seen on both large and small diameter trees, as well as in bromeliads, on rocks, and once on the ground. Females exhibited parental care, with spiderlings observed near the entrance to their retreats.

== Pet trade ==
The global pet trade in invertebrates, including tarantulas, remains poorly understood and often lacks adequate research and regulation.Tapinauchenius rasti (Caribbean diamond tarantula), endemic to Saint Vincent and the Grenadines, is a species of concern in the international pet trade. A recent study examined the extinction risks associated with its trade using the COM-B model, which assesses decision-making based on capability, opportunity, and motivation.

The study found that while T. rasti is widely traded, primarily through captive breeding, the current wildlife trade does not pose a significant threat to its populations. Motivation for acquiring the species was low due to its morphology and behavior, and wild collection is both challenging and unprofitable due to local enforcement and logistical difficulties. The species is also relatively inexpensive, further reducing the incentive to collect wild specimens. This assessment provides a model for evaluating threats from trade to other spider species, promoting sustainable and responsible practices that minimize risks to wild populations.In the pet trade, specimens labeled as Tapinauchenius sp. "Caribbean Diamond" and Tapinauchenius sp. "Union Island" are now recognized as T. rasti.
