= Antikuna cernickai =

Scientific classification
- Kingdom: Animalia
- Phylum: Arthropoda
- Subphylum: Chelicerata
- Class: Arachnida
- Order: Araneae
- Infraorder: Mygalomorphae
- Family: Theraphosidae
- Genus: Antikuna
- Species: A. cernickai

Binomial name
- Antikuna cernickai Kaderka, Ferretti & Lüddecke, 2021

Spider species

Antikuna cernickai is species of spider belonging to the family of Theraphosidae found in central Peru. It was first described by Radan Kaderka, Nelson Ferretti and Tim Lüddecke in 2021. Its name honors hobbyist M. Černička, who donated his spider collection to the MUSM arachnid collection.

== Description ==
Males have a dark gray abdomen and carapace with reddish-brown setae. The legs are dark brown with tiny golden hairs. The upper parts of the legs are darker with violet iridescence. Females also have a dark abdomen. They have black legs covered in short brown and long reddish-brown setae.

== Habitat ==
This spider is found in the Huancavelica region in Peru. It lives in high-altitude areas of over 4000m altitude. Together with other species in the Antikuna genus, this species resides in higher altitudes than most other species in the Theraphosidae family.
