= Chilocosmia =

Scientific classification
- Kingdom: Animalia
- Phylum: Arthropoda
- Subphylum: Chelicerata
- Class: Arachnida
- Order: Araneae
- Infraorder: Mygalomorphae
- Family: Theraphosidae
- Genus: Chilocosmia; Schmidt & von Wirth, 1992

Type species
- C. dichromata Schmidt & von Wirth, 1992

Species
- 1, see text

Genus of spiders

Chilocosmia is a genus of tarantulas that was first described by Schmidt & von Wirth in 1992. The genus was considered a junior synonym of Orphnaecus in 2012, but was re-classified as its own genus in 2025. It is a monotypic genus containing the single species, Chilocosmia dichromata.

== Taxonomy ==
This species was originally described as Chilocosmia dichromata by Schmidt & von Wirth, in 1992. In 2005, Peters changed the name to Selenocosmia dichromatus, and in 2012, West, Nunn & Hogg placed Chilocosmia (along with C. dichromatus) as a junior synonym of Orphnaecus, creating the combination Orphnaecus dichromatus. In 2025, Acuña, et al., found the genera sufficiently different to remain separate, re-classifying the species as Chilocosmia dichromata.

== Characteristics ==
C. dichromata has 10 large (and some small) teeth on the chelicerae in a row. It also has 4-5 rows of strikers (also on the chelicerae), that are basally thickest and longest. The 3 rows 10 unequal coxal strikers are clavate (scimitar shaped) and arranged in a semicircular shape. The cephalothorax, coxae and trochanter are reddish-brown and the abdomen and other leg segments are brown.
