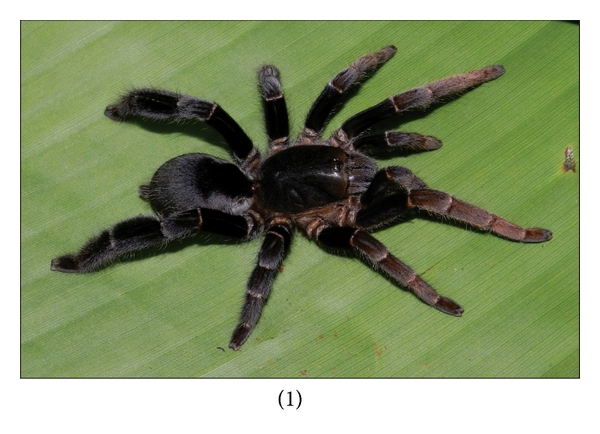

Scientific classification
- Kingdom: Animalia
- Phylum: Arthropoda
- Subphylum: Chelicerata
- Class: Arachnida
- Order: Araneae
- Infraorder: Mygalomorphae
- Family: Theraphosidae
- Genus: Lyrognathus
- Species: L. giannisposatoi

Binomial name
- Lyrognathus giannisposatoi Nunn & West, 2013

= Lyrognathus giannisposatoi =

Species of tarantula

Lyrognathus giannisposatoi sometimes called the Sumatran stout leg tarantula is a tarantula which can be found in Mesuji Regency, Sumatra, Indonesia. It was first described by Steven C. Nunn, Rick C. West in 2013, and is named after Gianni Sposato, who helped with Selenocosmia material, and was of great help to the authors.

== Description ==
They can be distinguished from all of the Lyrognathus genus, because of its bigger size and a more robust body, and for its preference of lower altitudes, which differs from most of the genus. In females the carapace is a dark brown with some orange almost pinkish striping. The opisthosoma is a deep black color, their legs nearest to the opisthosoma are a black color, getting a more orange even pink color the farther away they are. Males have roughly the same coloration though it is significantly darker.

== Behavior ==
They are burrowing old world tarantulas, as most tarantulas they will first try to flee, but if unable they are defensive, and may bite. As they are old world tarantulas, they likely have strong venom. They usually make burrows, where they spend most of their time in.
