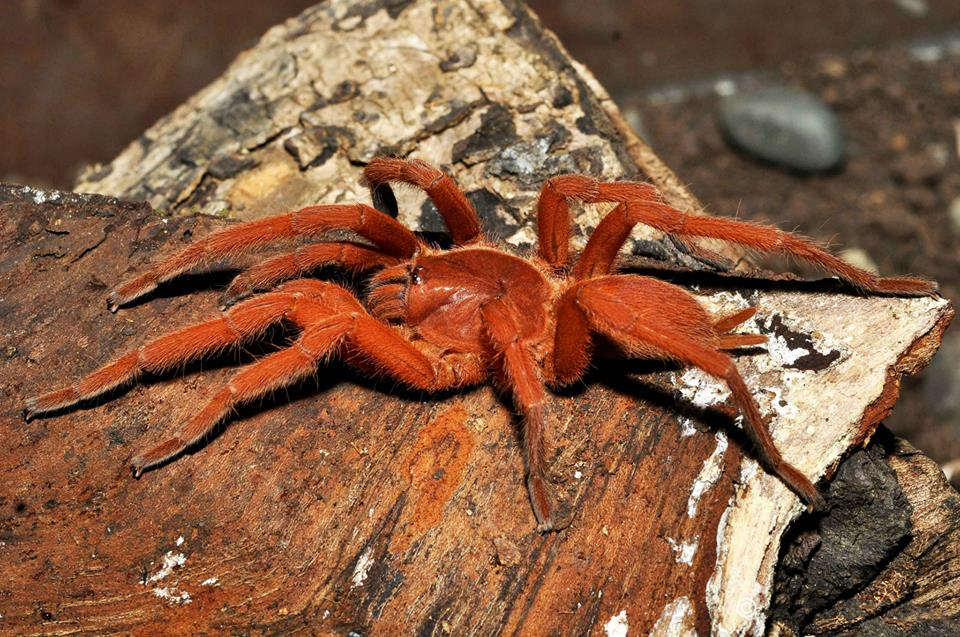
- Selenobrachys philippinus

Scientific classification
- Kingdom: Animalia
- Phylum: Arthropoda
- Subphylum: Chelicerata
- Class: Arachnida
- Order: Araneae
- Infraorder: Mygalomorphae
- Family: Theraphosidae
- Genus: Selenobrachys; Schmidt, 1999

Type species
- S. philippinus Schmidt, 1999

Species
- 2, see text

= Selenobrachys =

Genus of spiders

Selenobrachys is a genus of tarantulas that was first described by Schmidt in 1999. The genus was considered a junior synonym of Orphnaecus in 2012, but was re-classified as its own genus in 2025.

== Species ==
As of March 2025 it contains 2 species, both from the Philippines:

- Selenobrachys philippinus Schmidt, 1999
- Selenobrachys ustromsupasius Acuña et al., 2025
