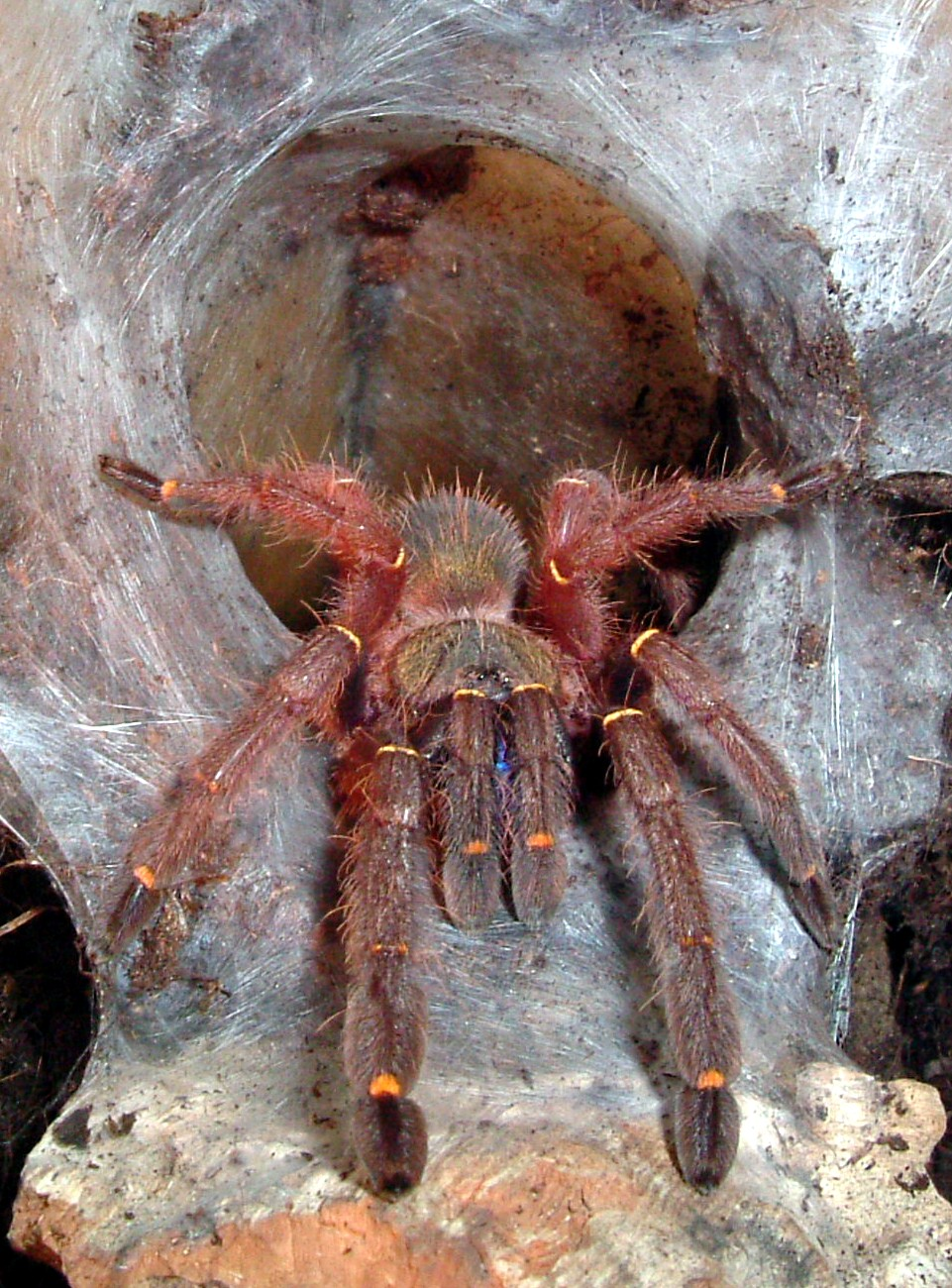
- Ephebopus cyanognathus

Scientific classification
- Kingdom: Animalia
- Phylum: Arthropoda
- Subphylum: Chelicerata
- Class: Arachnida
- Order: Araneae
- Infraorder: Mygalomorphae
- Family: Theraphosidae
- Genus: Ephebopus; Simon, 1892

Type species
- E. murinus (Walckenaer, 1837)

Species
- 5, see text

= Ephebopus =

Genus of spiders

Ephebopus is a genus of northeastern South American tarantulas that was first described by Eugène Louis Simon in 1892. Its relation to other tarantulas is one of the most uncertain in the family, and it has been frequently moved around and has been placed in each of the eight subfamilies at least once.

== Description ==
They normally grow to a legspan of 10 to 15 centimetres (3.9 to 5.9 in). Most live in burrows, though E. murinus spends an adolescent stage living in trees. Like many other New World tarantulas, these spiders will brush urticating hairs from their bodies as a defense against potential predation. However, these spiders are unique because instead of the abdomen, these hairs are located on the pedipalps, and are removed by rubbing the palps against the chelicerae.

== Diagnosis ==
They can be differentiated from all other tarantulas by the urticating patch of type 5 urticating hairs, on the pedipalp femora.

== Species ==
As of July 2022, the genus contains five species, found in Brazil, Suriname, Guyana, and French Guiana:

- Ephebopus cyanognathus West & Marshall, 2000 – French Guiana
- Ephebopus foliatus West, Marshall, Fukushima & Bertani, 2008 – Guyana
- Ephebopus murinus (Walckenaer, 1837) (type) – French Guiana, Suriname, Brazil
- Ephebopus rufescens West & Marshall, 2000 – French Guiana, Brazil
- Ephebopus uatuman Lucas, Silva & Bertani, 1992 – Brazil

=== In synonymy ===
- E. bistriatus (C. L. Koch, 1838) = Ephebopus murinus (Walckenaer, 1837)

=== Nomen Dubium ===
- Ephebopus fossor Pocock, 1903 - Ecuador

=== Transferred to other genera ===
- Ephebopus violaceus Mello-Leitão, 1930 → Tapinauchenius plumipes
