= Orphnaecus pellitus =

Scientific classification
- Kingdom: Animalia
- Phylum: Arthropoda
- Subphylum: Chelicerata
- Class: Arachnida
- Order: Araneae
- Infraorder: Mygalomorphae
- Family: Theraphosidae
- Genus: Orphnaecus
- Species: O. pellitus

Binomial name
- Orphnaecus pellitus Simon, 1892

Species of spider

Orphnaecus pellitus is a species of spider of the family Theraphosidae.

== Characteristics ==
O. pellitus has a dark brown cephalothorax and a red-brown abdomen. In females, the cephalothorax is 15.5 mm long, the abdomen is 22 mm, the maxillary palpus is 26.7 mm, and the legs are:

1. 49.5 mm
2. 41.5 mm
3. 38.5 mm
4. 49.8 mm.

In males, the cephalothorax is 12.5 mm, the maxillary palpus is 19.6 mm, and the legs are:

1. 47.5 mm
2. 40.5 mm
3. 30 mm
4. 48 mm
