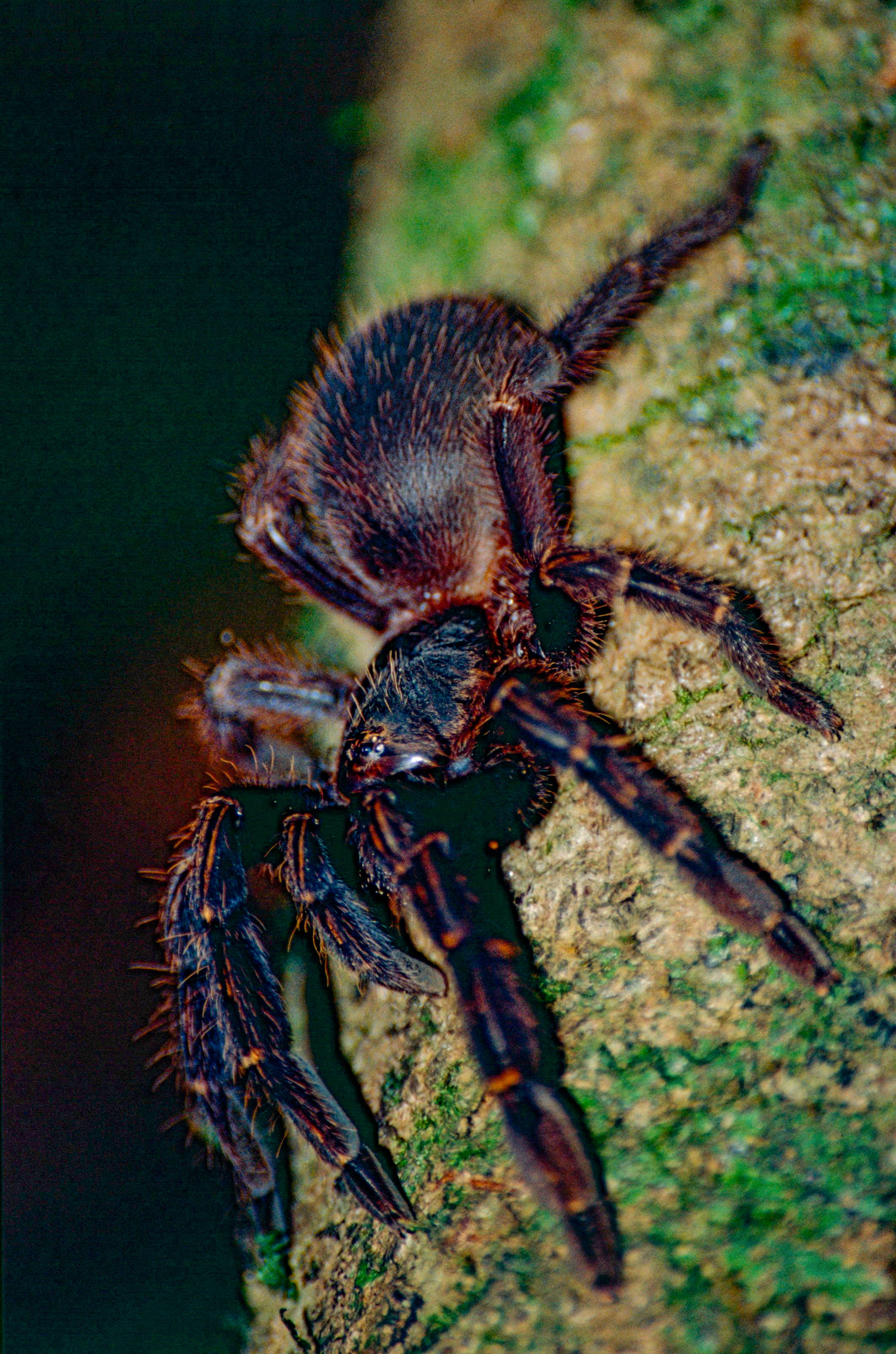

Scientific classification
- Kingdom: Animalia
- Phylum: Arthropoda
- Subphylum: Chelicerata
- Class: Arachnida
- Order: Araneae
- Infraorder: Mygalomorphae
- Family: Theraphosidae
- Genus: Ephebopus
- Species: E. rufescens

Binomial name
- Ephebopus rufescens West & Marshall, 2000

= Ephebopus rufescens =

Species of spider

Ephebopus rufescens, known as the red skeleton tarantula, is a species of tarantula (family Theraphosidae). It is found in French Guiana and Brazil.
