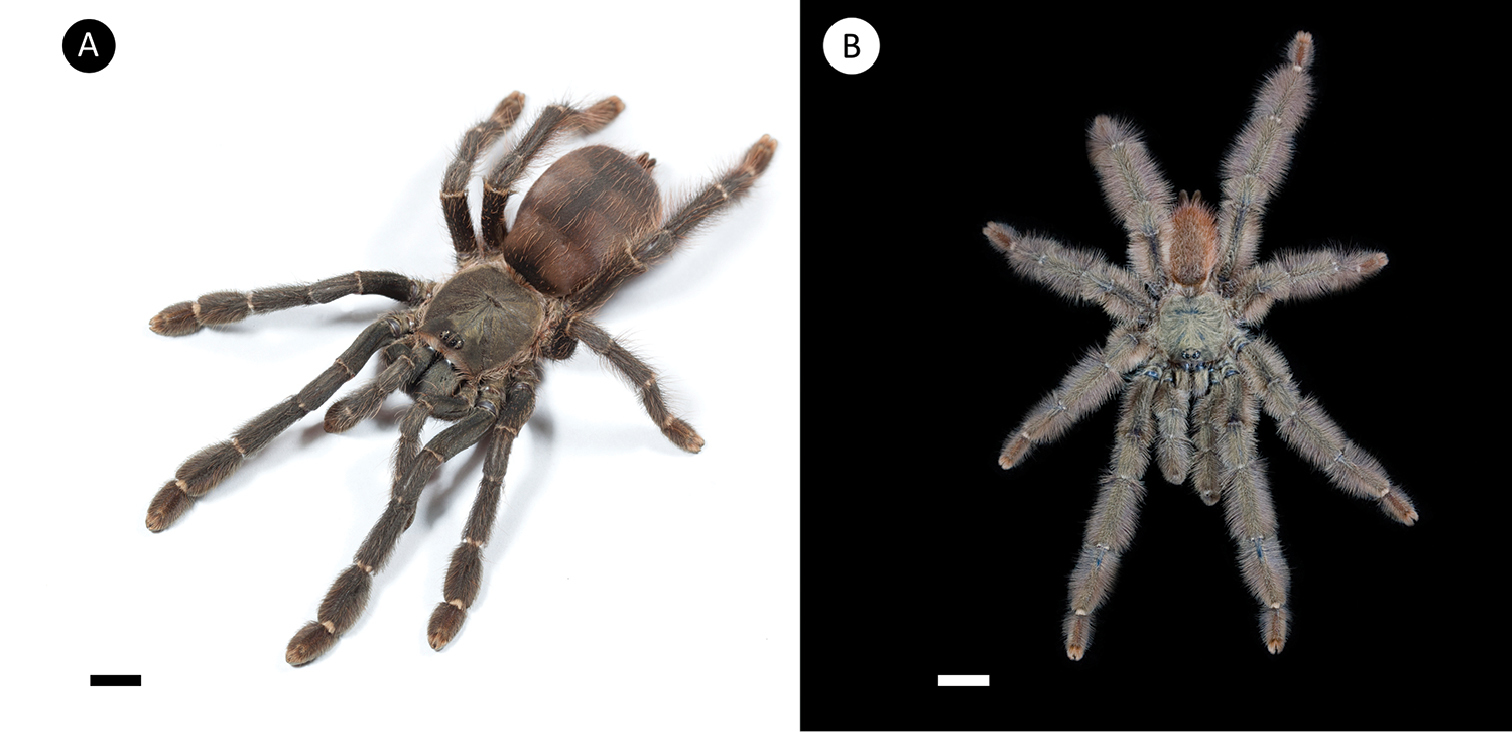
- A is a female specimen, while B is a male specimen. Scale bar = 5mm.

Scientific classification
- Kingdom: Animalia
- Phylum: Arthropoda
- Subphylum: Chelicerata
- Class: Arachnida
- Order: Araneae
- Infraorder: Mygalomorphae
- Family: Theraphosidae
- Genus: Amazonius
- Species: A. burgessi

Binomial name
- Amazonius burgessi Hüsser, 2018

= Amazonius burgessi =

Species of spider

Amazonius burgessi is a tarantula in the Amazonius genus, it was first described by Martin Hüsser in 2018. It is found in Leticia, Colombia and Iquitos, Peru, although it is likely also found in Ecuador. It is named after Joseph Burgess, who helped to collect important material for this study. It is fairly commonly bred and kept in captivity, with its common name being the Ghost Tree Spider. As the name suggests, it is an arboreal tarantula, and usually has a skittish behavior.

== Description ==
The described specimens were offspring raised in captivity of a wild caught specimen that was collected from a burrow and preserved in 80% ethanol. They have a faded brown, black or grey color, and long light hairs being orange or red in the abdomen.

== Habitat ==
This spider is found in Colombia, Peru and likely Ecuador, in lowland rainforests of the Amazon. With average temperatures of 25–26 °C, the average yearly rainfall being 2900mm, being roughly around 100m above sea level.

== Care ==
The A. Burgessi requires typical tarantula care, such as
