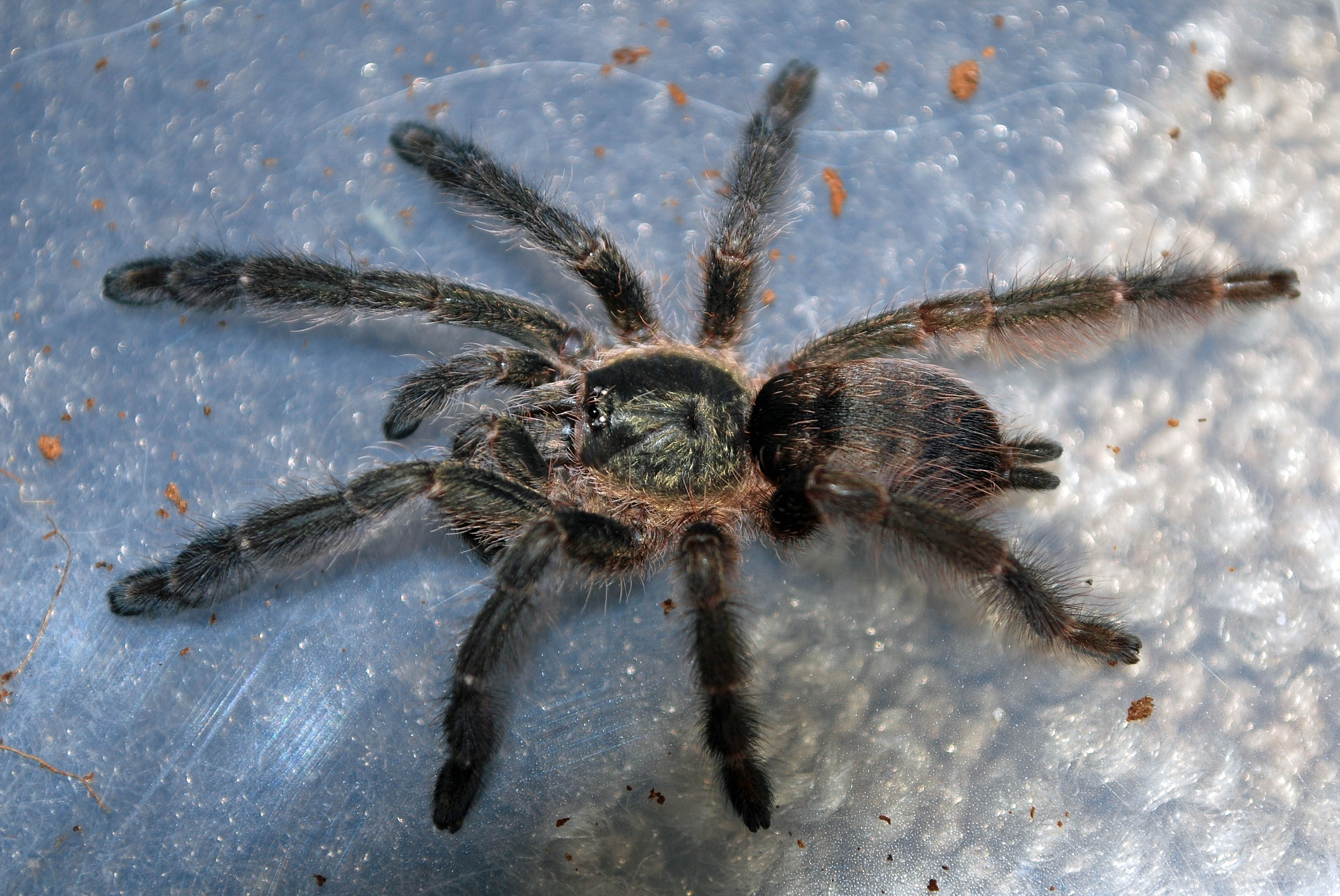
- Tapinauchenius cupreus

Scientific classification
- Kingdom: Animalia
- Phylum: Arthropoda
- Subphylum: Chelicerata
- Class: Arachnida
- Order: Araneae
- Infraorder: Mygalomorphae
- Family: Theraphosidae
- Genus: Tapinauchenius; Ausserer, 1871

Type species
- T. plumipes (C. L. Koch, 1842)

Species
- 9, see text

Synonyms
- Pseudoclamoris

= Tapinauchenius =

Genus of spiders

Tapinauchenius is a genus of tarantulas (family Theraphosidae) that was first described by Anton Ausserer in 1871. The name is a combination of the Greek ταπεινός, meaning "low", and αὐχήν, meaning "neck". In 2022, the genus Pseudoclamoris was transferred to Tapinauchenius.

== Description ==
They have true iridescent colors that change based on the amount of light and viewing angle. They are relatively small compared to sister genus Psalmopoeus, averaging about 4 to 4.5 inches (100 to 110 mm) long. They lack urticating hairs and are arboreal, often found in tree cavities. Many species have "dimples" on the abdomen, but this feature is not universal. Although their behavior is defensive, they lack both urticating hairs and the ability to stridulate, giving them a very mild venom. Their egg sacs can contain up to 200 spiderlings.

== Diagnosis ==
They differ from all of the other Psalmopoeinae genera by the lack of stridulatory organs in the palpal coxa, and from Ephebopus by the lack of urticating hairs on palpal femora. The species of this genus also lacks ontogenetic pattern change, in other words, juveniles are uniformly colored, as compared to other genus, in which juveniles have a different pattern than adults.

== Species ==
The genus Tapinauchenius was erected by Anton Ausserer in 1871 for the species Tapinauchenius plumipes, first described by Carl Ludwig Koch in 1842 in the genus Mygale and then moved by him to the genus Eurypelma. As of February 2022 it contains nine species, found only in South America and the Caribbean:

- Tapinauchenius brunneus Schmidt, 1995 – Brazil
- Tapinauchenius cupreus Schmidt & Bauer, 1996 – Ecuador
- Tapinauchenius gretae Cifuentes & Bertani, 2022 – Brazil
- Tapinauchenius herrerai Gabriel & Sherwood, 2022 - Panama
- Tapinauchenius latipes L. Koch, 1875 – Venezuela, Trinidad and Tobago, Guyana
- Tapinauchenius plumipes (C. L. Koch, 1842) (type) – Guyana, Suriname, French Guiana, Brazil
- Tapinauchenius polybotes Hüsser, 2018 – Lesser Antilles (St. Lucia)
- Tapinauchenius rasti Hüsser, 2018 – Lesser Antilles (St. Vincent and the Grenadines)
- Tapinauchenius sanctivincenti (Walckenaer, 1837) – St. Vincent

=== In synonymy ===
- Tapinauchenius concolor (Caporiacco, 1947) = Tapinauchenius plumipes
- Tapinauchenius deborri (Becker, 1879) = Tapinauchenius plumipes
- Tapinauchenius gigas (Caporiacco, 1954) = Tapinauchenius plumipes
- Tapinauchenius purpureus Schmidt, 1995 = Tapinauchenius plumipes
- Tapinauchenius violaceus (Mello-Leitão, 1930) = Tapinauchenius plumipes

=== Nomen dubium ===
- Tapinauchenius caerulescens Simon, 1891 - United States
- Tapinauchenius subcaeruleus Bauer & Antonelli, 1997 - Ecuador
- Tapinauchenius texensis Simon, 1891 - United States

=== Transferred to other genera ===
- Tapinauchenius elenae Schmidt, 1994 → Amazonius elenae
- Tapinauchenius grossus (Ausserer, 1871) → Grammostola grossa

== Pet ownership ==
This genus is well known by hobbyists for their incredible speed and striking coloration, but is not recommended for inexperienced owners. They are extremely skittish and defensive, and combined with their speed, handling them is not recommended. They thrive in environments that mimic the tropics, with a temperature from 70 to 80 °F (21 to 27 °C) and a relative humidity of 70% to 85%. The height of their enclosure is more important than floor space, preferring 14 inches (360 mm) of height and at least 7 to 8 inches (180 to 200 mm) of floor space. They prefer organic potting soil with the wood removed, though similar substrates can be substituted. Their diet consists of crickets, roaches, worms, or generic tarantula food, and most need a shallow dish of water or occasional misting. With proper care, these spiders can live for up to eighteen years.
