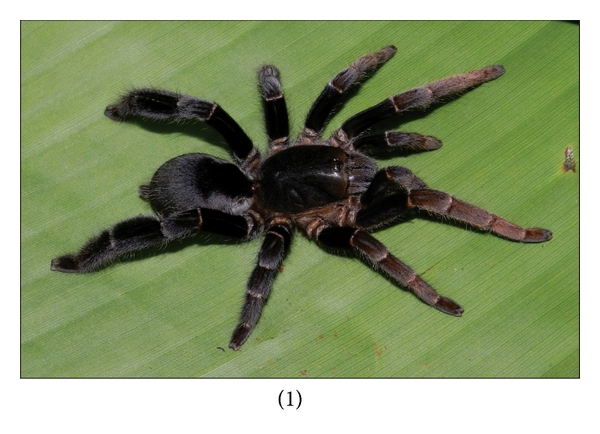

Scientific classification
- Kingdom: Animalia
- Phylum: Arthropoda
- Subphylum: Chelicerata
- Class: Arachnida
- Order: Araneae
- Infraorder: Mygalomorphae
- Family: Theraphosidae
- Subfamily: Selenocosmiinae
- Genus: Lyrognathus; Pocock, 1895

Type species
- L. crotalus Pocock, 1895

Species
- 7, see text

= Lyrognathus =

Genus of spiders

Lyrognathus is a genus of Asian tarantulas that was first described by Reginald Innes Pocock in 1895.

== Species ==
As of March 2020 it contains seven species, all found in Asia:

- Lyrognathus achilles West & Nunn, 2010 – Borneo
- Lyrognathus crotalus Pocock, 1895 (type) – India
- Lyrognathus fuscus West & Nunn, 2010 – Borneo
- Lyrognathus giannisposatoi Nunn & West, 2013 – Indonesia (Sumatra)
- Lyrognathus lessunda West & Nunn, 2010 – Indonesia (Lombok)
- Lyrognathus robustus Smith, 1988 – Malaysia
- Lyrognathus saltator Pocock, 1900 – India

In synonymy:

- L. liewi West, 1991 = Lyrognathus robustus Smith, 1988
- L. pugnax Pocock, 1900 = Lyrognathus crotalus Pocock, 1895

== Description ==
They are large tarantulas, grey or black in color. They have thick dense brushes of setae along the fourth tibia and metatarsi. The fourth coxa has an entirely hirsute retrolateral surface. The fourth metatarsus of females features an undivided scopula.

== Behaviour ==
They are fossorial, constructing tubular burrows in loose clayey soil. They utilize organic debris/vegetation to make the mouth of the burrow.
