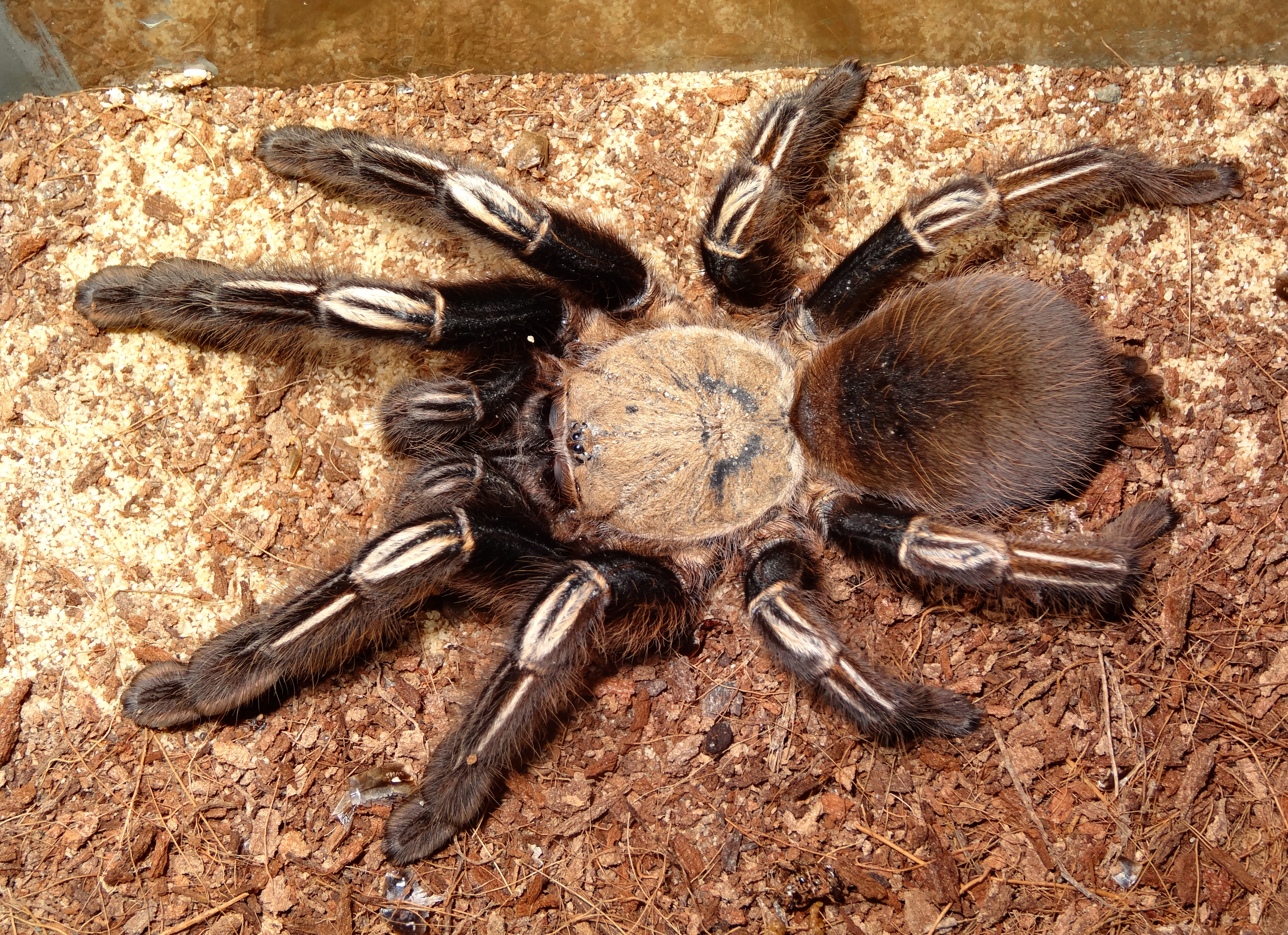

Scientific classification
- Kingdom: Animalia
- Phylum: Arthropoda
- Subphylum: Chelicerata
- Class: Arachnida
- Order: Araneae
- Infraorder: Mygalomorphae
- Family: Theraphosidae
- Genus: Ephebopus
- Species: E. murinus

Binomial name
- Ephebopus murinus (Walckenaer, 1837)

Synonyms
- Mygale murina Walckenaer, 1837; Mygale bistriata C. L. Koch, 1838; Santaremia pococki F. O. Pickard-Cambridge, 1896; Eurypelma bistriatum (C. L. Koch, 1838); Aphonopelma bistriatum (C. L. Koch, 1838)

= Skeleton tarantula =

Species of spider

The skeleton tarantula, Ephebopus murinus, is a species of spider belonging to the family Theraphosidae (tarantulas), sub-family Aviculariinae. A New World species, it is native to several South American countries. Its common name is derived from the skeleton-like markings on its legs.

== Taxonomy ==
The species was first described by Charles Athanase Walckenaer in 1837 as Mygale murina. In 1892, Eugène Simon placed it in his genus Ephebopus. Frederick Octavius Pickard-Cambridge described it as Santaremia pococki in 1896 (creating a new genus). Later Reginald Innes Pocock (1903) synonymised S. pococki with E. murinus, which remains the species' accepted scientific name to date.

The generic name, Ephebopus is derived from the Greek meaning "youth(ful)" plus "foot", and the specific name, murinus is from the Latin meaning "mouse-colored".

== Description ==
The adult E. murinus usually grows to a leg span of about 11–12 cm (4.5 inches), though females can grow as large as 15 cm (6 inches).

The legs are black, the abdomen is small and brown, and the carapace is coffee colored or golden. The leg striping is similar to that of Aphonopelma seemani, but more yellowish in colour.

== Habitat and distribution ==
E. murinus is a terrestrial, semi-fossorial, lowland forest-dwelling species native to northern Brazil, French Guiana, and Suriname.

== Behavior ==
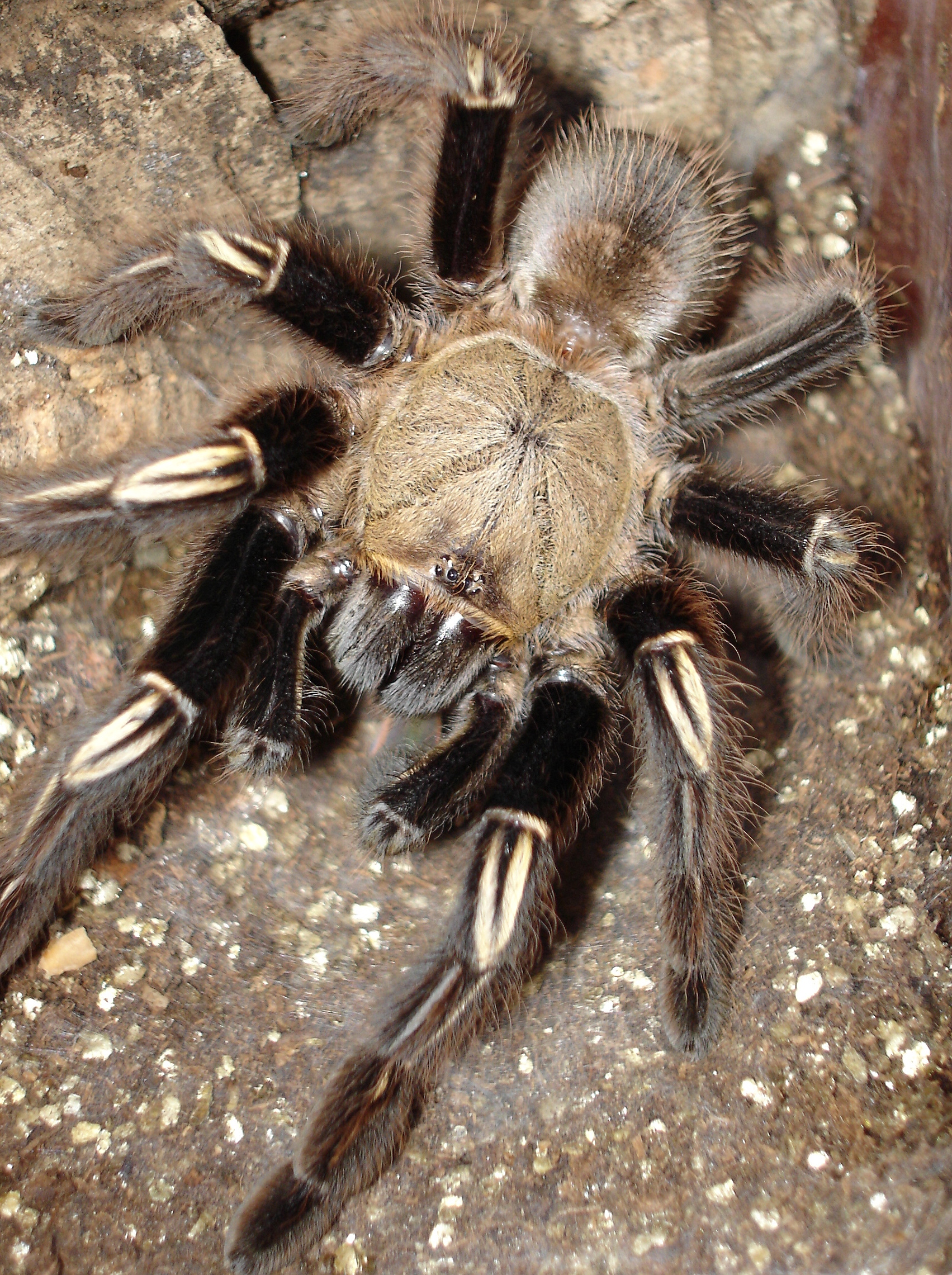
Skeleton tarantula

Unlike most members of the subfamily Aviculariinae, which are arboreal, E. murinus lives mainly on or near the forest floor, where it will build a heavily webbed burrow beneath the topsoil or amongst branches, rocks, and other forest floor debris.

As a defense against potential predators, and in common with many other New World tarantulas, the species of the genus Ephebopus will brush urticating hairs from their bodies. Uniquely, rather than being located on the abdomen, Ephebopus urticating hairs are located on the spider's palps - on the medial side of the palpal femora; the spider sheds these hairs by rubbing the palp against the chelicerae.

E. murinus is also a fast and aggressive species, and will readily rise up and present its fangs to a potential predator.

== Diet ==
In common with most terrestrial tarantula species, Ephobopus murinus feeds on ground-dwelling insects, worms and small mammals.
