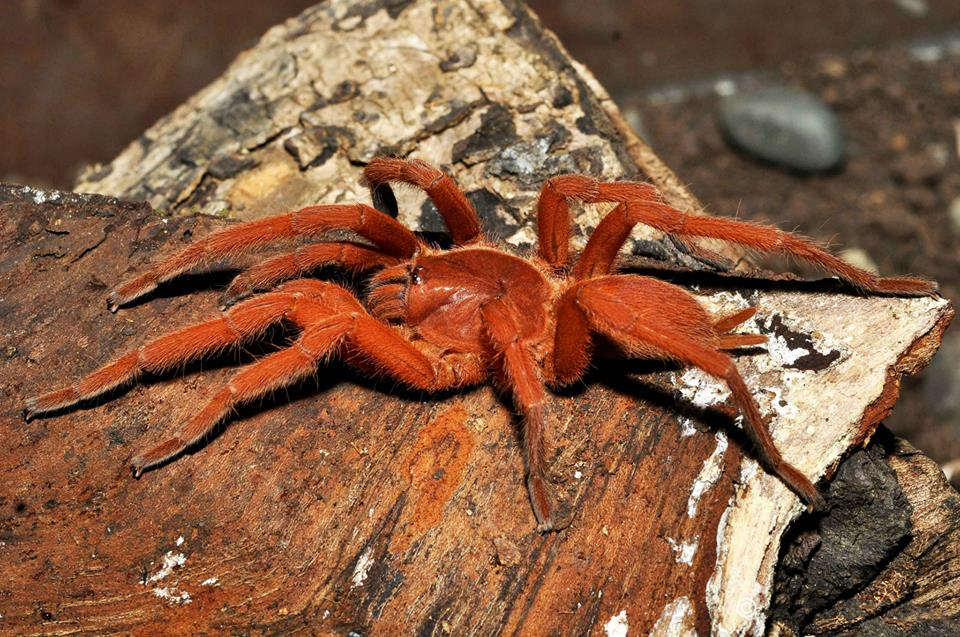

Scientific classification
- Kingdom: Animalia
- Phylum: Arthropoda
- Subphylum: Chelicerata
- Class: Arachnida
- Order: Araneae
- Infraorder: Mygalomorphae
- Family: Theraphosidae
- Genus: Selenobrachys
- Species: S. philippinus

Binomial name
- Selenobrachys philippinus (Schmidt, 1999)

Synonyms
- Orphnaecus philippinus

= Selenobrachys philippinus =

Species of spider

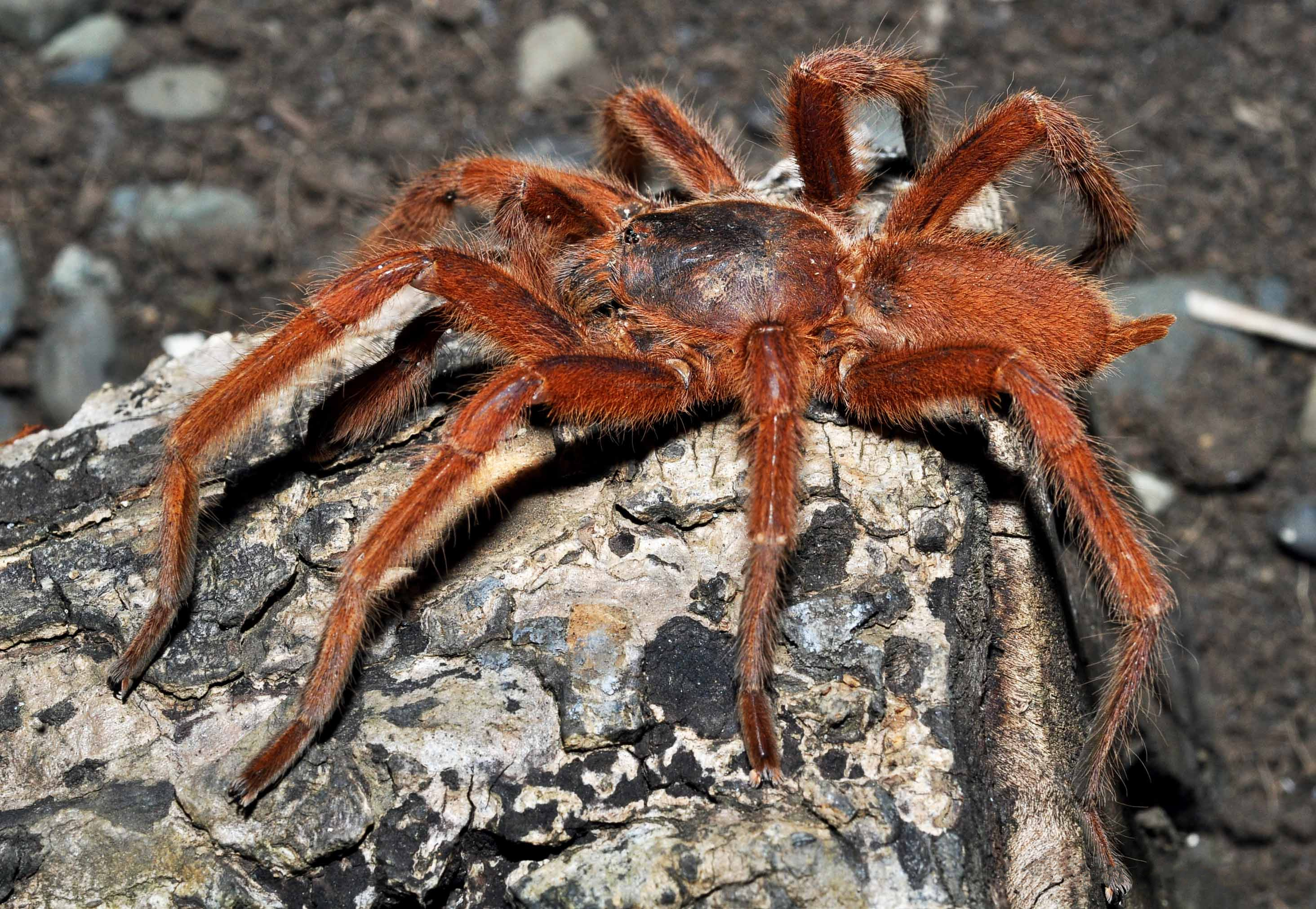

Selenobrachys philippinus, known as the Philippine tangerine, Philippine orange, or neon orange tarantula is a species of tarantula (family Theraphosidae). It is native to the Philippines. It was described in 1999, by Günter Schmidt, as Selenobrachys philippinus; in 2012, Rick West, Steven Nunn and Henry Hogg made the genus Selenobrachys a junior synonym of Orphnaecus, but in 2025 it was re-classified into its own genus by Acuña, et al.

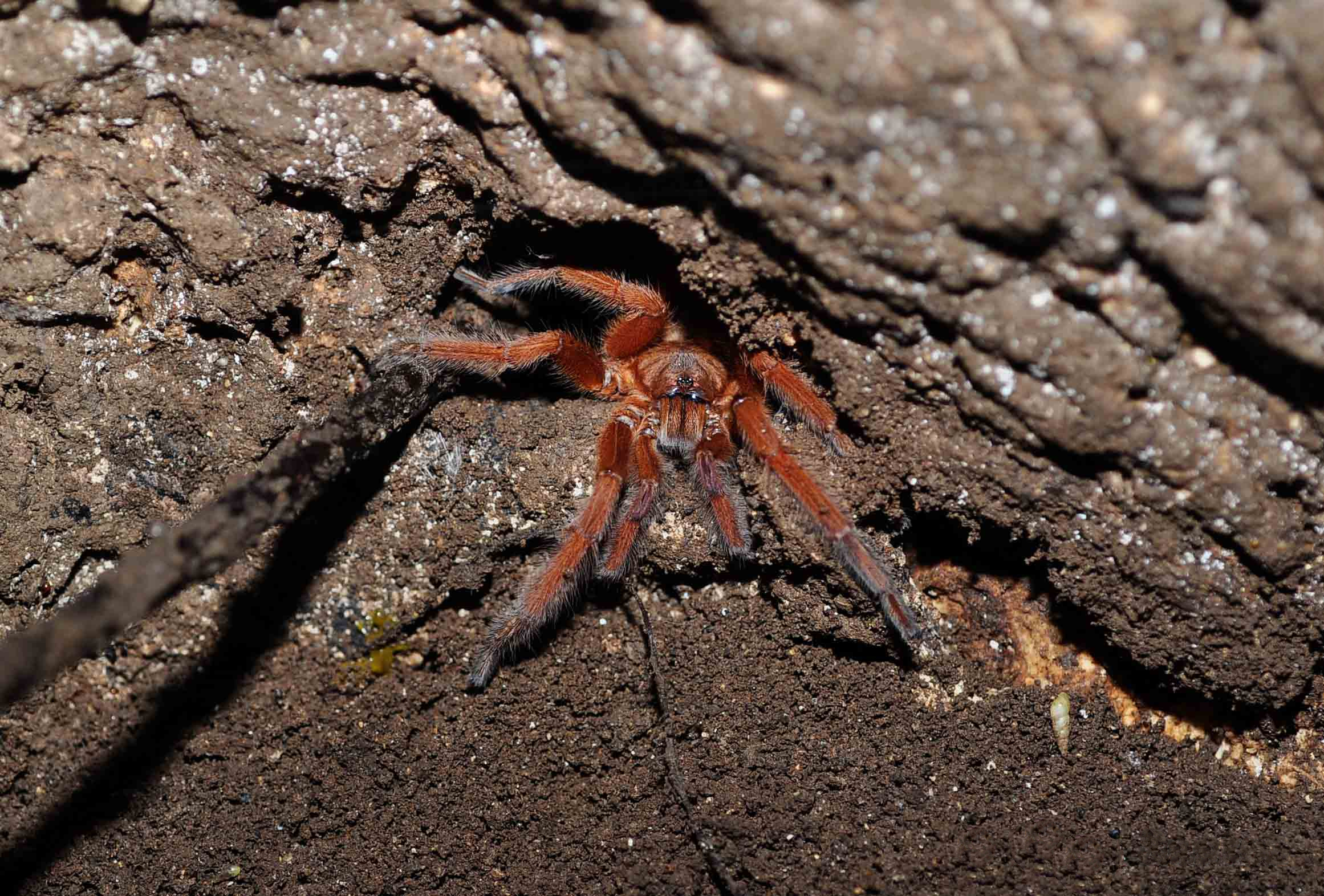

== Description ==
It has an orange in colour throughout the entire body. It is 28 mm long, or 30 mm with chelicerae included. The fovea is procurved. The retrolateral face of the chelicerae is setae-less and the stridulatory setae on the maxillae are butter knife-shaped.

== Behavior ==
This is an obligate burrower tarantula. They are quite secretive though they are usually found outside their burrows. They would rather flee than fight, and their usual hunting strategy is just to wait.
