= Antikuna (spider) =

Scientific classification
- Kingdom: Animalia
- Phylum: Arthropoda
- Subphylum: Chelicerata
- Class: Arachnida
- Order: Araneae
- Infraorder: Mygalomorphae
- Family: Theraphosidae
- Genus: Antikuna; Kaderka, Ferretti, West, Lüddecke & Hüsser, 2021

Type species
- A. cernickai Kaderka, Ferretti & Lüddecke, 2021

Species
- 7, see text

Genus of tarantulas

Antikuna is a genus of South American tarantulas. It was first described by Radan Kaderka, N. Ferretti and M. Hüsser in 2021, and it has only been found in Peru. The species of this genus live at the highest recorded altitude for the theraphosidae family, with a record of an altitude of 4,689 meters.

== Species ==
As of April 2022 it contains seven species:

- A. cernickai Kaderka, Ferretti & Lüddecke, 2021 (type) – Peru
- A. cimrmani Kaderka, Ferretti & Hüsser, 2021 – Peru
- A. cyanofemur Kaderka, Ferretti & Hüsser, 2021 – Peru
- A. majkusi Kaderka, Ferretti & Lüddecke, 2021 – Peru
- A. sapallanga Kaderka, Ferretti & Lüddecke, 2021 – Peru
- A. urayrumi Ferretti, Kaderka & West, 2021 – Peru
- A. valladaresi Ferretti, Kaderka & West, 2021 – Peru
