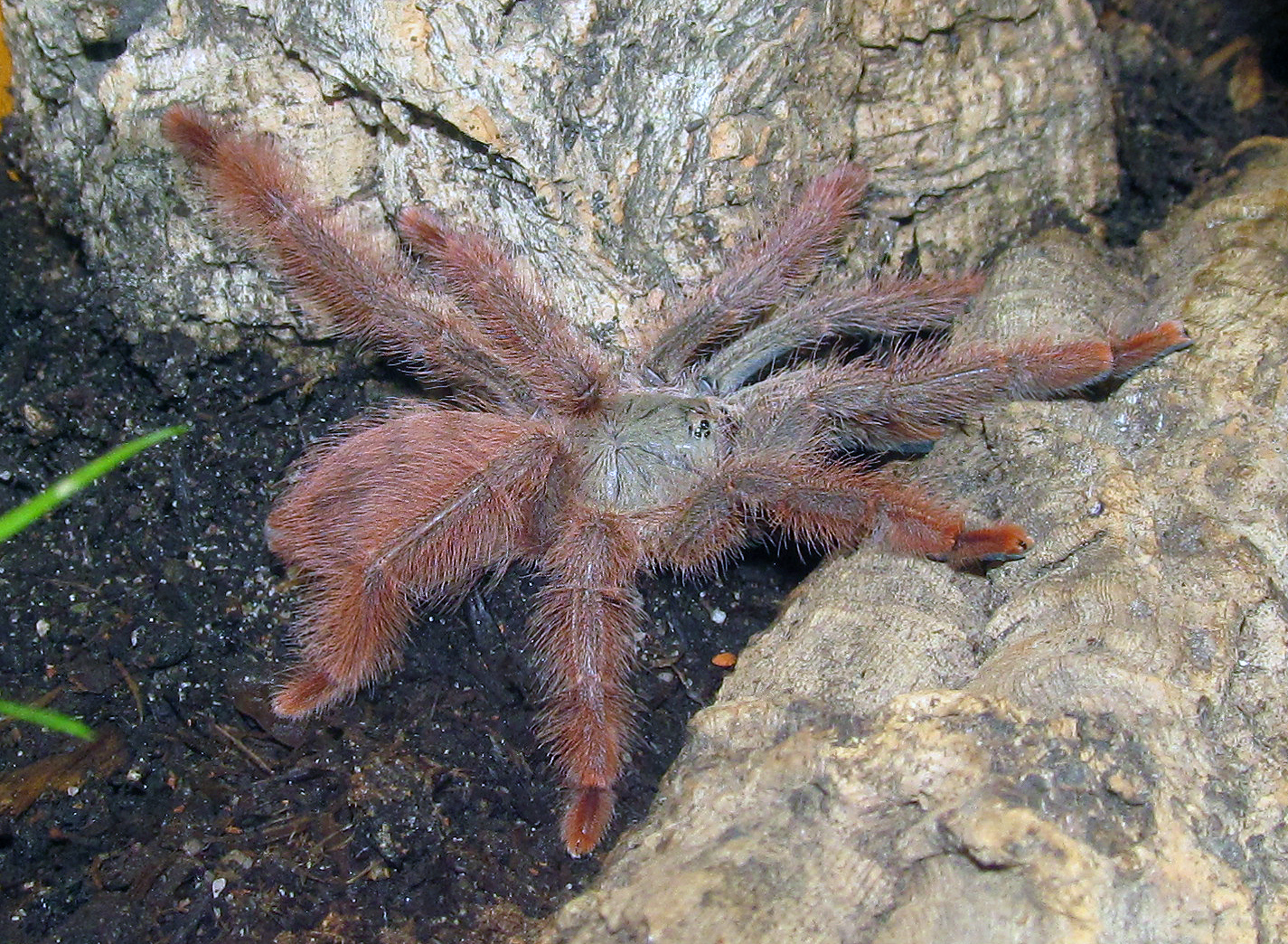
- Young female (initially misidentified as Tapinauchenius gigas, a synonym of Tapinauchenius plumipes)

Scientific classification
- Kingdom: Animalia
- Phylum: Arthropoda
- Subphylum: Chelicerata
- Class: Arachnida
- Order: Araneae
- Infraorder: Mygalomorphae
- Family: Theraphosidae
- Genus: Amazonius
- Species: A. germani

Binomial name
- Amazonius germani Cifuentes & Bertani, 2022

= Amazonius germani =

Species of spider

Amazonius germani is a species of spider in the tarantula family Theraphosidae, found in French Guiana and Brazil.

== Taxonomy ==
In 1994, Günter Schmidt described a spider from French Guiana he identified as Tapinauchenius gigas (a synonym of Tapinauchenius plumipes). His identification was then followed by other arachnologists. However, it is now considered that Schmidt misidentified this spider, which was described as the new species Amazonius germani in 2022.
