= Rick C. West =

Canadian arachnologist

- Born: December 3, 1951 (age 74); Victoria, British Columbia, Canada
- Citizenship: Canada
- Scientific career
- Fields: Arachnology
- Author abbrev. (zoology): West

Rick C. West (born 3 December 1951) is a Canadian arachnologist and an expert on the taxonomy of tarantula spiders. West was born in Victoria, British Columbia. He has been interested in spiders since childhood, and collected his first tarantula, Aphonopelma eutylenum, at the age of 13. He worked primarily as a Chief Constable for a local Animal Humane Society, but also have been involved with the collecting, breeding, rearing and photography of theraphosid spiders. West has traveled to over 27 countries to document and study them in their environment, has been a host, presenter and co-producer in several tarantula documentaries and has also described several genera and species.

== Described theraphosid taxa ==
Genera

- Antikuna Kaderka, Ferretti, West, Lüddecke & Hüsser, 2021
- Chinchaysuyu Ferretti, Chaparro, Ochoa & West, 2023
- Crassicrus Reichling & West, 1996
- Psednocnemis West, Nunn & Hogg, 2012

Species

- Antikuna urayrumi Ferretti, Kaderka & West, in Kaderka et al., 2021
- Antikuna valladaresi Ferretti, Kaderka & West, in Kaderka et al., 2021
- Bistriopelma kiwicha Nicoletta, Chaparro, Mamani, Ochoa, West & Ferretti, 2020
- Bistriopelma peyoi Nicoletta, Chaparro, Mamani, Ochoa, West & Ferretti, 2020
- Chaetopelma persianum Zamani & West, 2023
- Chinchaysuyu spinosa Ferretti, Chaparro, Ochoa & West, 2023
- Citharacanthus meermani Reichling & West, 2000
- Coremiocnemis hoggi West & Nunn, 2010
- Coremiocnemis kotacana West & Nunn, 2010
- Coremiocnemis obscura West & Nunn, 2010
- Crassicrus lamanai Reichling & West, 1996
- Cyclosternum palomeranum West, 2000
- Ephebopus cyanognathus West & Marshall, 2000
- Ephebopus foliatus West, Marshall, Fukushima & Bertani, 2008
- Ephebopus rufescens West & Marshall, 2000
- Hapalotremus apasanka Sherwood, Ferretti, Gabriel & West, 2021
- Hapalotremus carabaya Ferretti, Cavallo, Chaparro, Ríos-Tamayo, Seimon & West, 2018
- Hapalotremus chasqui Ferretti, Cavallo, Chaparro, Ríos-Tamayo, Seimon & West, 2018
- Hapalotremus chespiritoi Ferretti, Cavallo, Chaparro, Ríos-Tamayo, Seimon & West, 2018
- Hapalotremus hananqheswa Sherwood, Ferretti, Gabriel & West, 2021
- Hapalotremus kaderkai Sherwood, Ferretti, Gabriel & West, 2021
- Hapalotremus kuka Ferretti, Cavallo, Chaparro, Ríos-Tamayo, Seimon & West, 2018
- Hapalotremus marcapata Ferretti, Cavallo, Chaparro, Ríos-Tamayo, Seimon & West, 2018
- Hapalotremus perezmilesi Ferretti, Cavallo, Chaparro, Ríos-Tamayo, Seimon & West, 2018
- Hapalotremus vilcanota Ferretti, Cavallo, Chaparro, Ríos-Tamayo, Seimon & West, 2018
- Hapalotremus yuraqchanka Sherwood, Ferretti, Gabriel & West, 2021
- Ischnocolus vanandelae Montemor, West & Zamani, 2020
- Lyrognathus achilles West & Nunn, 2010
- Lyrognathus fuscus West & Nunn, 2010
- Lyrognathus giannisposatoi Nunn & West, 2013
- Lyrognathus lessunda West & Nunn, 2010
- Lyrognathus liewi West, 1991 (synonymous with Lyrognathus robustus Smith, 1988)
- Magnacarina aldana (West, 2000)
- Phlogiellus bogadeki Nunn, West & von Wirth, 2016
- Phlogiellus johnreylazoi Nunn, West & von Wirth, 2016
- Phlogiellus moniqueverdezae Nunn, West & von Wirth, 2016
- Phlogiellus pelidnus Nunn, West & von Wirth, 2016
- Psednocnemis brachyramosa (West & Nunn, 2010)
- Psednocnemis davidgohi West, Nunn & Hogg, 2012
- Psednocnemis gnathospina (West & Nunn, 2010)
- Psednocnemis jeremyhuffi (West & Nunn, 2010)
- Tmesiphantes intiyaykuy Nicoletta, Ferretti, Chaparro & West, 2022

== Eponymous Taxa ==
Species

- Aelurillus westi Azarkina & Zamani, 2019 (Salticidae)
- Antillena rickwesti (Bertani & Huff, 2013) (Theraphosidae)
- Melloina rickwesti Raven, 1999 (Paratropididae)
- Phoneyusa westi Smith, 1990 (Theraphosidae)

== Filmography ==
Year	Title	Role	Notes
2008	Monster Quest	Himself	Episode: Monster Spider
2006	The Real Lost World	Himself	TV movie
2002	Tarantula: King of the Spiders	Himself	TV movie
2002	Spidermania	Himself	TV movie
1999	Giants: face to face with the worlds largest predators	Himself	TV movie
1998	Spiders	Himself	TV - PBS Episode
1998	Champions of the Wild	Himself	TV movie - Tarantulas

== Selected publications ==
- Ferretti, N., Chaparro, J. C., Ochoa, J. A. & West, R. (2023). A new tarantula (Mygalomorphae: Theraphosidae) genus endemic from Peru with a novel genitalic morphology among theraphosinae and its phylogenetic placement. Zoologischer Anzeiger 302: 102-112.
- Nicoletta, M., Ferretti, N. E., Chaparro, J. C. & West, R. C. (2022). First record of Tmesiphantes Simon, 1892 (Araneae: Theraphosidae) in Peru: a new species and its phylogenetic placement. Anais da Academia Brasileira de Ciências 94(4, e20200702): 1-17.
- Kaderka, R., Ferretti, N., Hüsser, M., Lüddecke, T. & West, R. (2021). Antikuna, a new genus with seven new species from Peru (Araneae: Theraphosidae: Theraphosinae) and the highest altitude record for the family. Journal of Natural History 55(21-22): 1335-1402.
- Nicoletta, M., Chaparro, J. C., Mamani, L., Ochoa, J. A., West, R. C. & Ferretti, N. E. (2020). Two new endemic species of Bistriopelma (Araneae: Theraphosidae) from Peru, including a new remarkable horned tarantula. European Journal of Taxonomy 644: 1-20.
- Ferretti, N., Cavallo, P., Chaparro, J. C., Ríos-Tamayo, D., Seimon, T. A. & West, R. (2018). The Neotropical genus Hapalotremus Simon, 1903 (Araneae: Theraphosidae), with the description of seven new species and the highest altitude record for the family. Journal of Natural History 52(29-30): 1927-1984.
- Sherwood, D., Ferretti, N. E., Gabriel, R. & West, R. C. (2021d). Redescription of the theraphosine Hapalotremus albipes Simon, 1903 and description of four new species of Hapalotremus Simon, 1903 from Peru and Bolivia (Araneae: Theraphosidae). Arachnology 18(9): 965-989.
- Montemor, V. M., West, R. C., Zamani, A., Moradmand, M., Wirth, V. von, Wendt, I., Huber, S. & Guadanucci, J. P. L. (2020). Taxonomy of the genus Ischnocolus in the Middle East, with description of a new species from Oman and Iran (Araneae: Theraphosidae). Zoology in the Middle East 66(1): 76-90.
- Nunn, S. C., West, R. C. & Wirth, V. von (2016): A revision of the selenocosmiine tarantula genus Phlogiellus Pocock 1897 (Araneae: Theraphosidae), with description of 4 new species. International Journal of Zoology 2016(9895234) Full Text
- West, R. C., Nunn, S. C. & Hogg, S. (2012): A new tarantula genus, Psednocnemis, from west Malaysia (Araneae: Theraphosidae), with cladistic analysis and biogeography of Selenocosmiinae Simon 1889. Zootaxa 3299 Abstract
- West, R. C. & Nunn, S. C. (2010): A taxonomic revision of the tarantula spider genus Coremiocnemis Simon 1892 (Araneae, Theraphosidae), with further notes on the Selenocosmiinae. Zootaxa 2443 Abstract
- West, R. C. & Nunn, S. C. (2010): A taxonomic revision of the tarantula spider genus Lyrognathus Pocock 1895 (Araneae, Theraphosidae), with notes on the Selenocosmiinae. Zootaxa 2362 Abstract
- West, R. C., Marshall, S. D., Fukushima, C. S. & Bertani, R. (2008): Review and cladistic analysis of the Neotropical tarantula genus Ephebopus Simon 1892 (Araneae: Theraphosidae) with notes on the Aviculariinae. Zootaxa 1849 Abstract
- Reichling, S. B. & West, R. C. (2000). A new species of tarantula spider (Araneae, Mygalomorphae, Theraphosidae) from the Cayo District of Belize. The Southwestern Naturalist 45: 128-132.
- West, R. C. (2000). Some new theraphosids from western Mexico (Araneae, Mygalomorphae). The Southwestern Naturalist 45: 299-305.
- Reichling, S. B. & West, R. C. (1996). A new genus and species of theraphosid spider from Belize (Araneae, Theraphosidae). Journal of Arachnology 24: 254-261.
