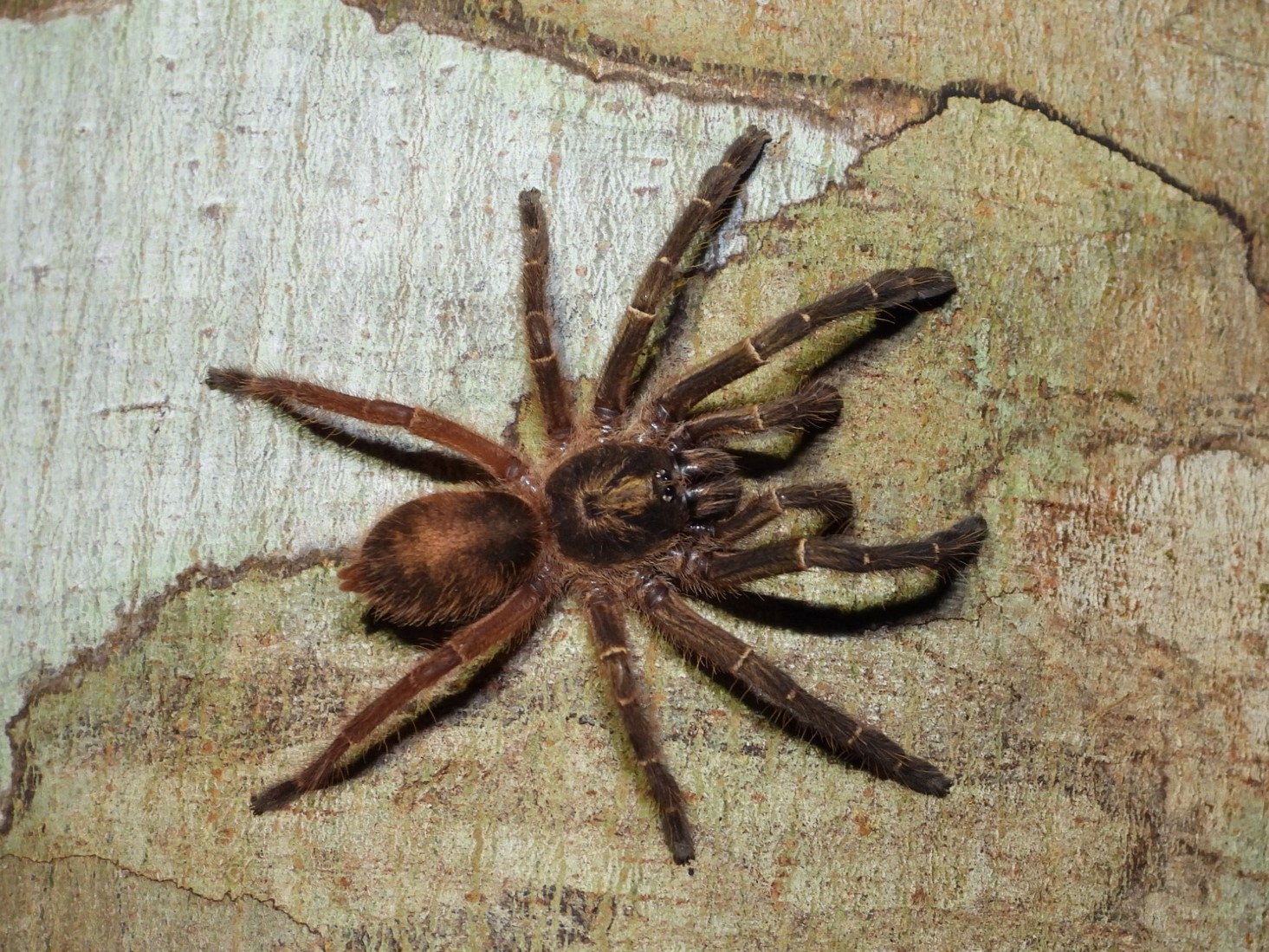

Scientific classification
- Kingdom: Animalia
- Phylum: Arthropoda
- Subphylum: Chelicerata
- Class: Arachnida
- Order: Araneae
- Infraorder: Mygalomorphae
- Family: Theraphosidae
- Genus: Ephebopus
- Species: E. foliatus

Binomial name
- Ephebopus foliatus West et al., 2008

= Ephebopus foliatus =

Species of spider

Ephebopus foliatus is a species of tarantula in the family Theraphosidae found in Guiana.
