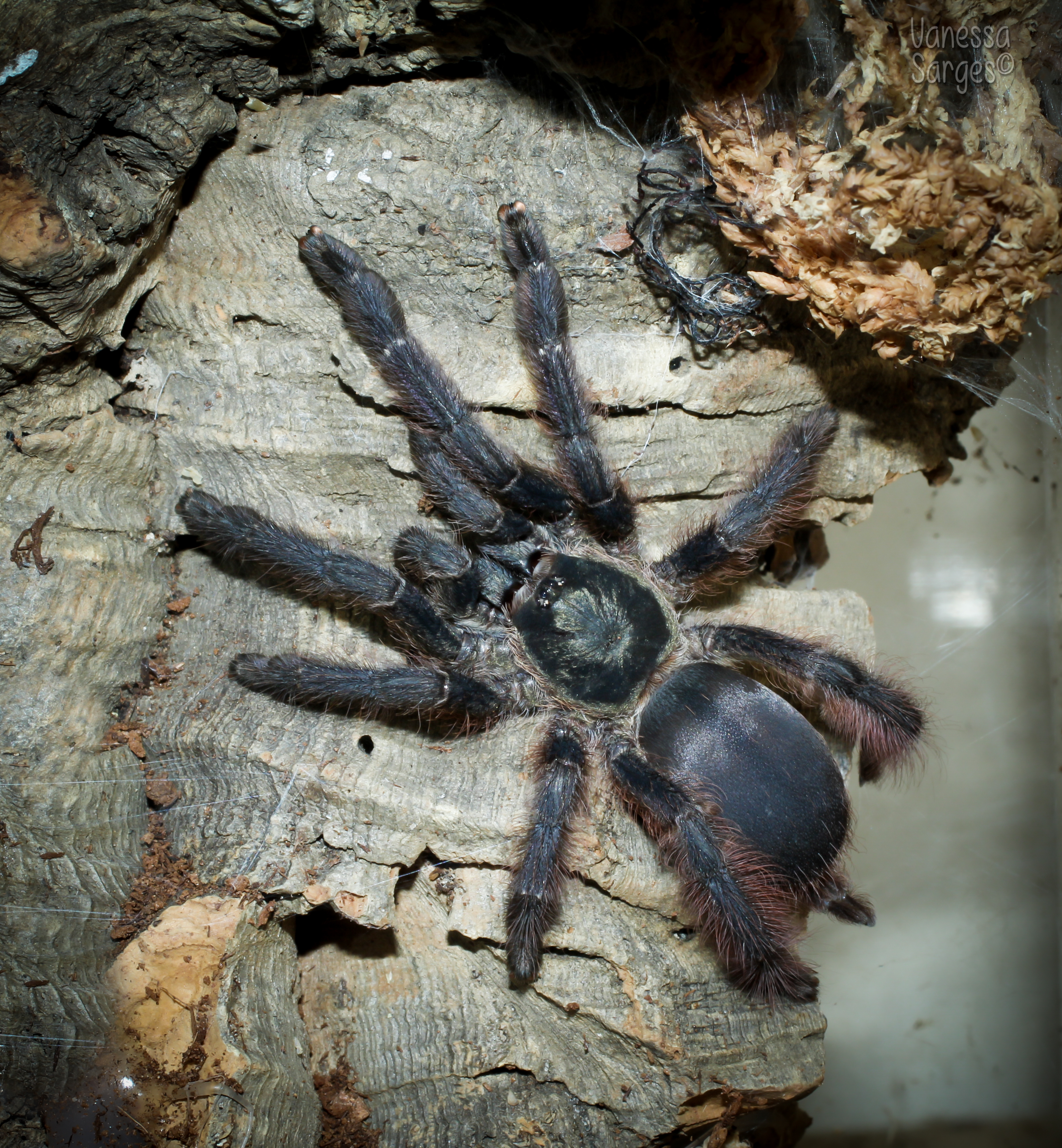
- Initially identified under the synonym Tapinauchenius violaceus

Scientific classification
- Kingdom: Animalia
- Phylum: Arthropoda
- Subphylum: Chelicerata
- Class: Arachnida
- Order: Araneae
- Infraorder: Mygalomorphae
- Family: Theraphosidae
- Genus: Tapinauchenius
- Species: T. plumipes

Binomial name
- Tapinauchenius plumipes (C.L. Koch, 1842)

Synonyms
- Avicularia deborrii Becker, 1879; Avicularia violacea (Mello-Leitão, 1930); Ephebopus violaceus Mello-Leitão, 1930; Eurypelma plumipes (C. L. Koch, 1842); Mygale plumipes C. L. Koch, 1842; Pachystopelma concolor Caporiacco, 1947; Pseudoclamoris gigas (Caporiacco, 1954); Tapinauchenius concolor (Caporiacco, 1947); Tapinauchenius gigas Caporiacco, 1954; Tapinauchenius purpureus Schmidt, 1995; Tapinauchenius violaceus (Mello-Leitão, 1930)

= Tapinauchenius plumipes =

Species of spider

Tapinauchenius plumipes is a tarantula native to western South America. It was first described by Carl Ludwig Koch in 1842. Its synonyms include Tapinauchenius gigas; Amazonius germani was misidentified as T. gigas between 1994 and 2022.

== Taxonomy ==
Tapinauchenius plumipes was first described by Carl Ludwig Koch in 1842 as Mygale plumipes. It was transferred to the genus Tapinauchenius by Anton Ausserer in 1871.

Among its synonyms is Tapinauchenius gigas. In 1994, Günter Schmidt described a spider from French Guiana he identified as T. gigas. His identification was then followed by other arachnologists. However, it is now considered that Schmidt had misidentified this spider, which was described as Amazonius germani in 2022.

== Distribution ==
Tapinauchenius plumipes is native to western South America: Guyana, Suriname, French Guiana, and Brazil.

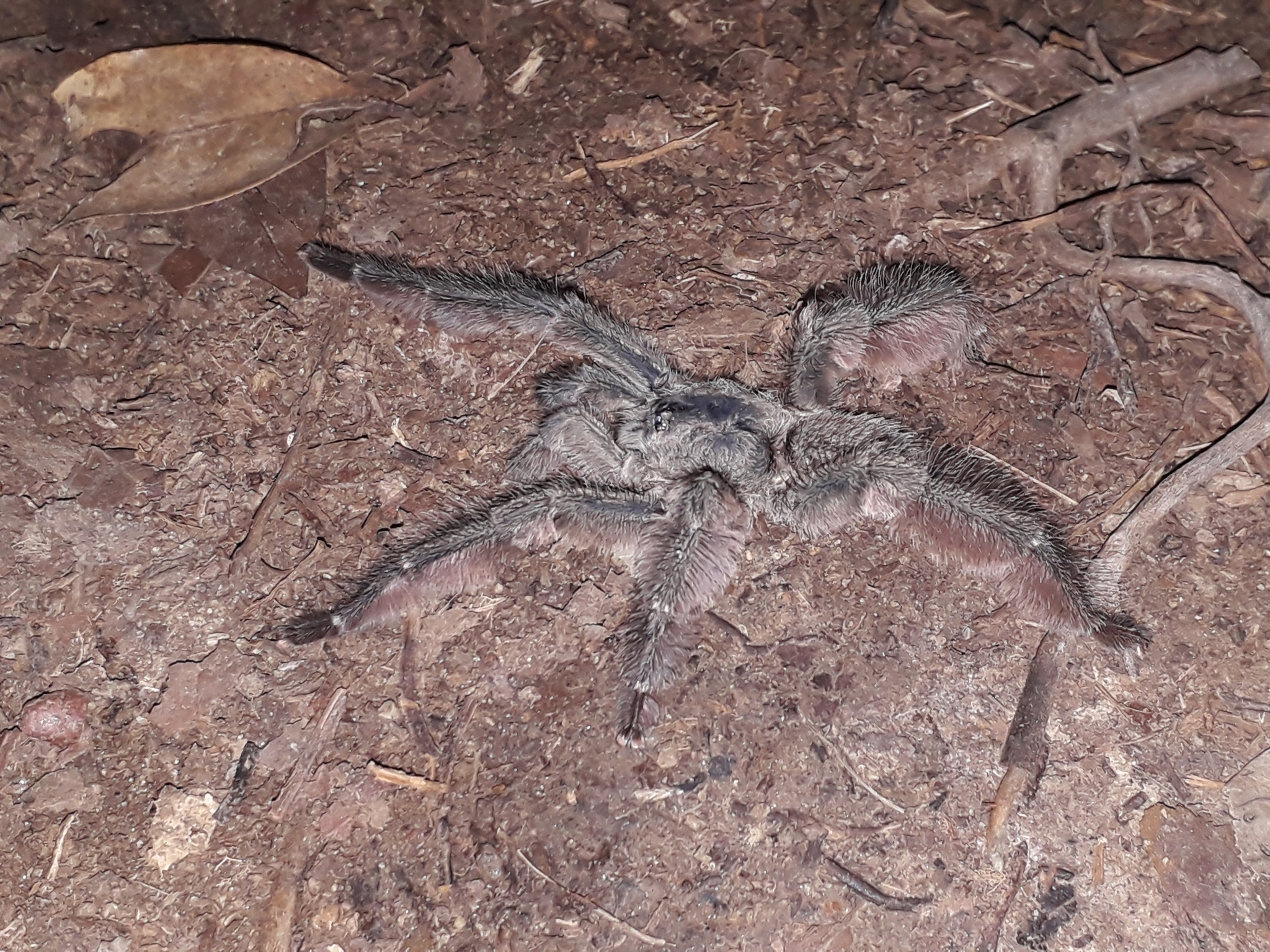
In French Guiana
