= List of tarantulas of Sri Lanka =

Sri Lanka is a tropical island situated close to the southern tip of India.

The following is a non-exhaustive list of tarantulas native to Sri Lanka.

== Tarantulas ==
Phylum: Arthropoda
Class: Arachnida
Order: Araneae
Family: Theraphosidae

Tarantulas are easily identified by their hairy nature and large size from other commonly encountered spiders. Throughout the world, they are considered as a popular exotic pets, as most of the tarantulas are non-poisonous to humans. In Sri Lanka, the largest known specimens are size of a dinner plate, or size of the palm. There are over 9000 species of tarantulas are described from all over the world, where they are not found in most of the Europe, North America and other Arctic colder regions. They are well distributed in Africa, south of Asia, South America, and Oceania. Indian subcontinent including India and Sri Lanka is home to 15 tarantula species, where India has 7 endemic species and Sri Lanka has 9 endemic species, where another one species is native to both countries.

The species called Poecilotheria amarasekarai is still in debate, whether it is a distinct species or the morph of Poecilotheria rajaei.

The species Poecilotheria hanumavilasumica, thought to be endemic to India, was recently found from Mannar district of Sri Lanka.

In IUCN Red List, the species Poecilotheria vittata is cited as a synonym of Indian species Poecilotheria striata, but in other local text books and online publications, it is cited as a separate species.

Name	Binomial	Distribution in island
	Chilobrachys nitelinus	Central
	Chilobrachys jonitriantisvansickleae	Western
	Plesiophrictus tenuipes	Central
Sri Lankan ornamental tarantula	Poecilotheria fasciata	Central
Rameshwaram ornamental tarantula	Poecilotheria hanumavilasumica	North-Western
Fringed ornamental tarantula	Poecilotheria ornata	Southern
Mankulam Pink-banded ornamental tarantula	Poecilotheria rajaei	Northern
Yellow-backed ornamental tarantula	Poecilotheria smithi	South Central
Ivory ornamental tarantula	Poecilotheria subfusca	South Central
Magam ornamental tarantula	Poecilotheria vittata	Southern
	Poecilotheria srilankensis	
