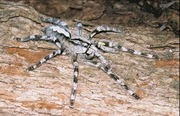

Conservation status
- Critically Endangered (IUCN 3.1)
- CITES Appendix II

Scientific classification
- Kingdom: Animalia
- Phylum: Arthropoda
- Subphylum: Chelicerata
- Class: Arachnida
- Order: Araneae
- Infraorder: Mygalomorphae
- Family: Theraphosidae
- Genus: Poecilotheria
- Species: P. hanumavilasumica

Binomial name
- Poecilotheria hanumavilasumica Smith, 2004

= Poecilotheria hanumavilasumica =

Species of spider

Poecilotheria hanumavilasumica, also known as the Rameshwaram ornamental, or Rameshwaram parachute spider, is a critically endangered species of tarantula.

== Description ==
The ground color of the first pair of legs is daffodil yellow. The femur has a black band covering three quarters of the part. The patella is daffodil yellow with a thin black band distally. The tibia is also daffodil yellow with a thick black transverse band. The ground color of the fourth pair of legs is bluish grey, with a black patch proximally. The femur has a bluish grey band. The patella is also bluish grey with faint black mark distally. The tibia is bluish grey.

When comparing the females of this species to the males, the males have a significantly shorter lifespan than the females. While the females can live up to 10 years, the male spiders typically only live through one to two breeding seasons (Siliwal).

P. hanumavilasumica is a member of the Poecilotheria radiation and has bright yellow legs I and II. It includes the Indian and Sri Lankan species Poecilotheria regalis, Poecilotheria fasciata, Poecilotheria rajaei, and Poecilotheria striata. P. hanumavilasumica bears a strong resemblance to its sibling species, P. fasciata. The distinguishing features between these two species include the following: the band on the femur of leg I in P. hanumavilasumica is notably broader than that in P. fasciata. In P. hanumavilasumica the band on the femur of leg IV forms a continuous line, while in P. fasciata, it appears disjointed. P. hanumavilasumica can be easily distinguished from other species within the same radiation group, such as P. regalis and P. rajaei, due to the presence of a ventral abdominal band. In the case of P. striata, the banding is thicker on all four legs. However, the most distinctive difference between P. hanumavilasumica and its sibling species, P. fasciata, lies in the morphology of the spermatheca.

== Distribution ==
It was discovered in 2004 by Andrew Smith from a sacred grove of the Hanumavilasum Temple in Rameshwaram.

It was initially thought to be endemic to the Ramanathapuram district in the state of Tamil Nadu, India, but has since been identified outside India in the Mannar District of Northern Sri Lanka. The close proximity of Mannar island to India suggests that the species may have dispersed over the land bridge between the two countries in the Pleistocene epoch.
