= Uperodon nagaoi =

Conservation status
- Endangered (IUCN 3.1)

Scientific classification
- Kingdom: Animalia
- Phylum: Chordata
- Class: Amphibia
- Order: Anura
- Family: Microhylidae
- Genus: Uperodon
- Species: U. nagaoi

Binomial name
- Uperodon nagaoi (Manamendra-Arachchi and Pethiyagoda, 2001)

Synonyms
- Ramanella nagaoi Manamendra-Arachchi and Pethiyagoda, 2001

Species of amphibian

Uperodon nagaoi, also known as the Nagao's pug-snout frog or Nagao's globular frog, is a species of frogs in the family Microhylidae. It is endemic to Sri Lanka and is known from the Central, Sabaragamuwa, Southern, and Western Provinces. The specific name nagaoi honours Eijiro Nagao, president of Marusan Securities who, through the Nagao Environmental Foundation, has supported research on Sri Lankan amphibians.

== Description ==
Adult males measure 26–30 mm (1.0–1.2 in) and adult females 27–32 mm (1.1–1.3 in) in snout–vent length. The head is wider than it is long. The snout is truncate in dorsal view and rounded in lateral view. The tympanum is not externally visible but a tympanic ridge is present. The fingers have lateral dermal fringes and triangularly dilated tips. The toes have rudimentary webbing and slightly truncate or rounded, enlarged, fleshy and smooth tips. The colouration is dark brown. There are yellow spots near the eyes and on the upper lip. Reddish-orange patches are present on the snout, sides of the dorsum, abdomen, and around the vent and on the limbs. Males have an externally visible gular vocal sac.

== Habitat and conservation ==
Uperodon nagaoi are terrestrial and arboreal as adults and prefer lowland moist forest habitats. There are records from about 125–150 m (410–492 ft) above sea level. Breeding takes place in tree holes where the tadpoles also develop. It appears to be an obligate tree hole breeder. One female was found submerged in a tree hole, with an egg clutch adhering to the wall few centimeters above the water level. This suggests that parental care might be present.

Uperodon nagaoi is known to occur in the Kanneliya Forest Reserve (its type locality) as well as in the Hiyare Forest Reserve.

== Behavior ==
The frog is noted to have a possibly mutualistic relationship with tarantulas such as Poecilotheria ornata and Poecilotheria subfusca, sharing tree holes of which some were observed to contain eggs and/or juveniles from the spider, frog, or both. As observed between frog Chiasmocleis ventrimaculata and tarantula Xenesthis immanis, the spider may protect the frog from predators while the frog protects the spider's eggs from ants.
