= Poecilotheria tigrinawesseli =

Wessel's tiger ornamental tarantula

Conservation status
- Data Deficient (IUCN 3.1)
- CITES Appendix II

Scientific classification
- Kingdom: Animalia
- Phylum: Arthropoda
- Subphylum: Chelicerata
- Class: Arachnida
- Order: Araneae
- Infraorder: Mygalomorphae
- Family: Theraphosidae
- Genus: Poecilotheria
- Species: P. tigrinawesseli

Binomial name
- Poecilotheria tigrinawesseli Smith, 2006

Species of spider

Poecilotheria tigrinawesseli, also known as Wessel's tiger ornamental or Anantagiri's parachute spider, is an arboreal tarantula. It is endemic to Eastern Ghats of India and known from six locations around Andhra Pradesh.

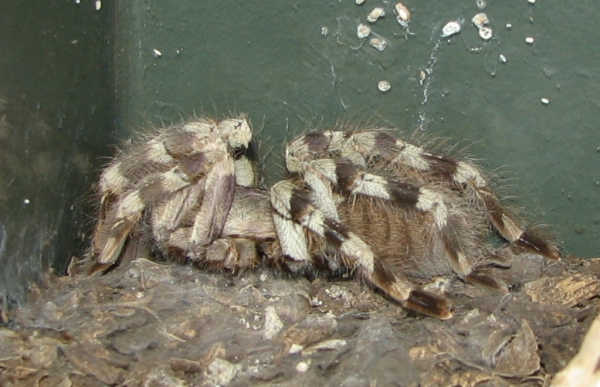
Salem Ornamental, a close species to tiger ornamental

The species is morphologically similar to Poecilotheria formosa, but genetically similar to Poecilotheria miranda.

== Size and Behavior ==
Poecilotheria tigrinawesseli is a large arboreal tarantula species within the family Theraphosidae. Adult females can reach a diagonal leg span of approximately 7–8 inches (17–20 cm), while males are slightly smaller and more slender.

This species exhibits fast growth under optimal conditions, including warm temperatures (24–28 Celsius) and consistent feeding. Coloration changes noticeably after molting, with a vivid contrast and a subtle violet sheen near the carapace and legs, which darkens over time before the next molt.

Behaviorally, P. tigrinawesseli is arboreal and shy, preferring to retreat to elevated shelters rather than immediately threat-posing when disturbed. This species is unlikely to leave its established retreat once it has built a home. Overall, it prefers to escape rather than bite, though its medically significant venom can cause severe consequences to house pets and humans.

== Identification ==
In the first pair of legs, the ground color is daffodil yellow. Femur has a black band distally, ending with a thin yellow band. Patella also has a thin black band distally. Tibia daffodil yellow.

In fourth pair of legs, the ground color is bluish-grey. Femur has a thin black band proximally. Patella has a thin black band as well distally. Tibia is bluish-grey in color. Overall the leg pattern is symmetric like zebras.

It is endemic to the central highlands of Sri Lanka, where it inhabits montane forests and tree hollows at elevations above 1000 metres. Adults display intricate ivory, grey, and dark brown markings, providing camouflage against bark and moss. Females are generally larger and more robust than males, reaching a leg span of up to 18 cm. Like other members of the genus, the species is fast-moving and defensive but rarely aggressive unless provoked. Its population is considered vulnerable due to habitat degradation in Sri Lanka’s highlands, and international trade is regulated under CITES Appendix II.

== Ecology ==
The species is confined to the eastern ghats of India. Inhabiting in tree hollows, under tree barks, rock crevices, not common in human habitations. Not much information is known about this species.
