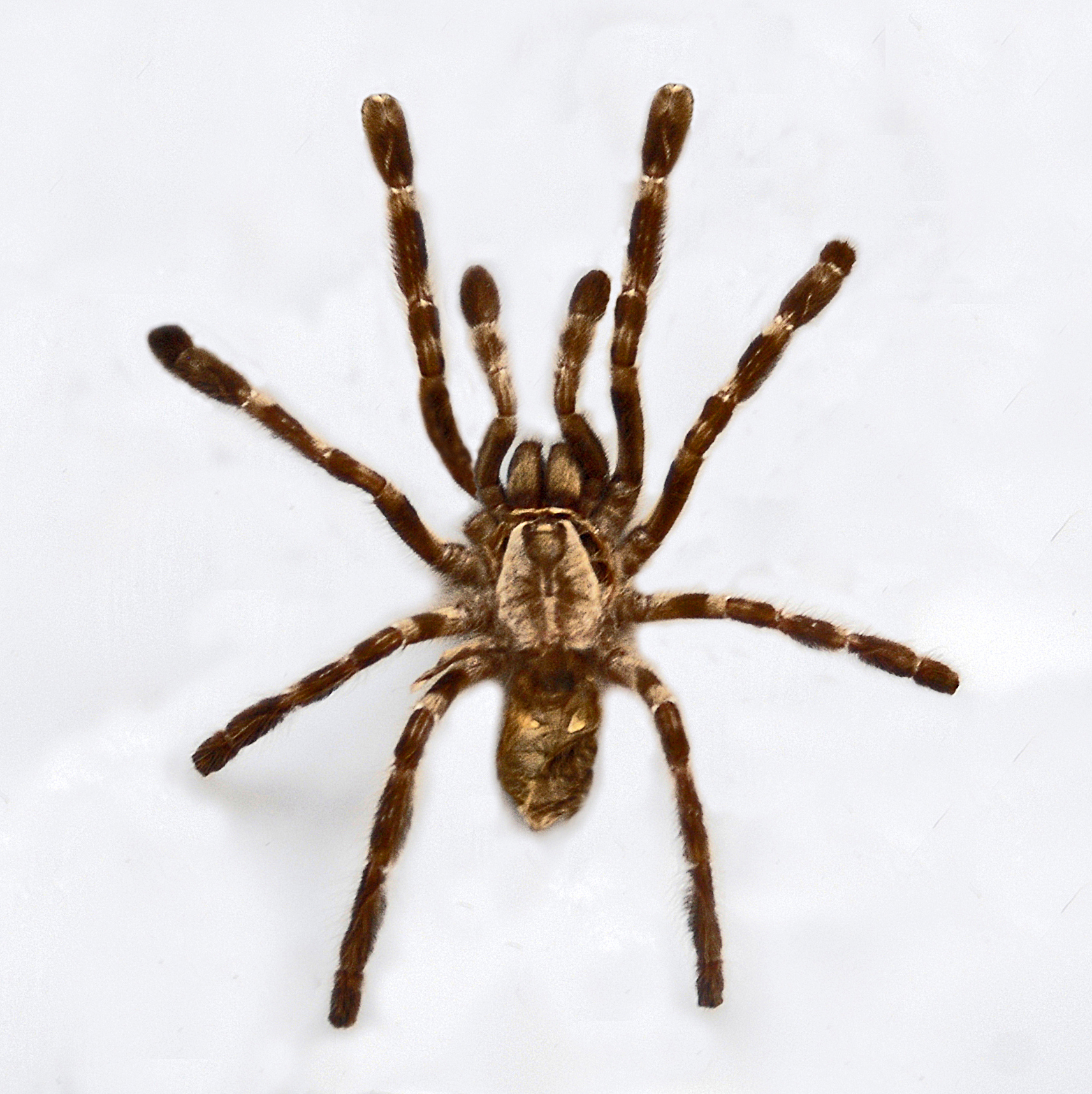
- Museum specimen

Conservation status
- Endangered (IUCN 3.1)
- CITES Appendix II

Scientific classification
- Kingdom: Animalia
- Phylum: Arthropoda
- Subphylum: Chelicerata
- Class: Arachnida
- Order: Araneae
- Infraorder: Mygalomorphae
- Family: Theraphosidae
- Genus: Poecilotheria
- Species: P. vittata

Binomial name
- Poecilotheria vittata Pocock, 1895

Synonyms
- Poecilotheria pederseni Kirk, 2001

= Poecilotheria vittata =

Species of spider

Poecilotheria vittata, sometimes called Pederson's ornamental, the ghost ornamental, or magam tiger spider, is an arboreal tarantula. It is endemic to Sri Lanka. In IUCN Red List, the species is cited as a synonym of Indian species Poecilotheria striata, but in other local text books and online publications, it is cited as a separate species. As of February 2016, the species was considered to be native to both India and Sri Lanka by the World Spider Catalog.

== Description ==
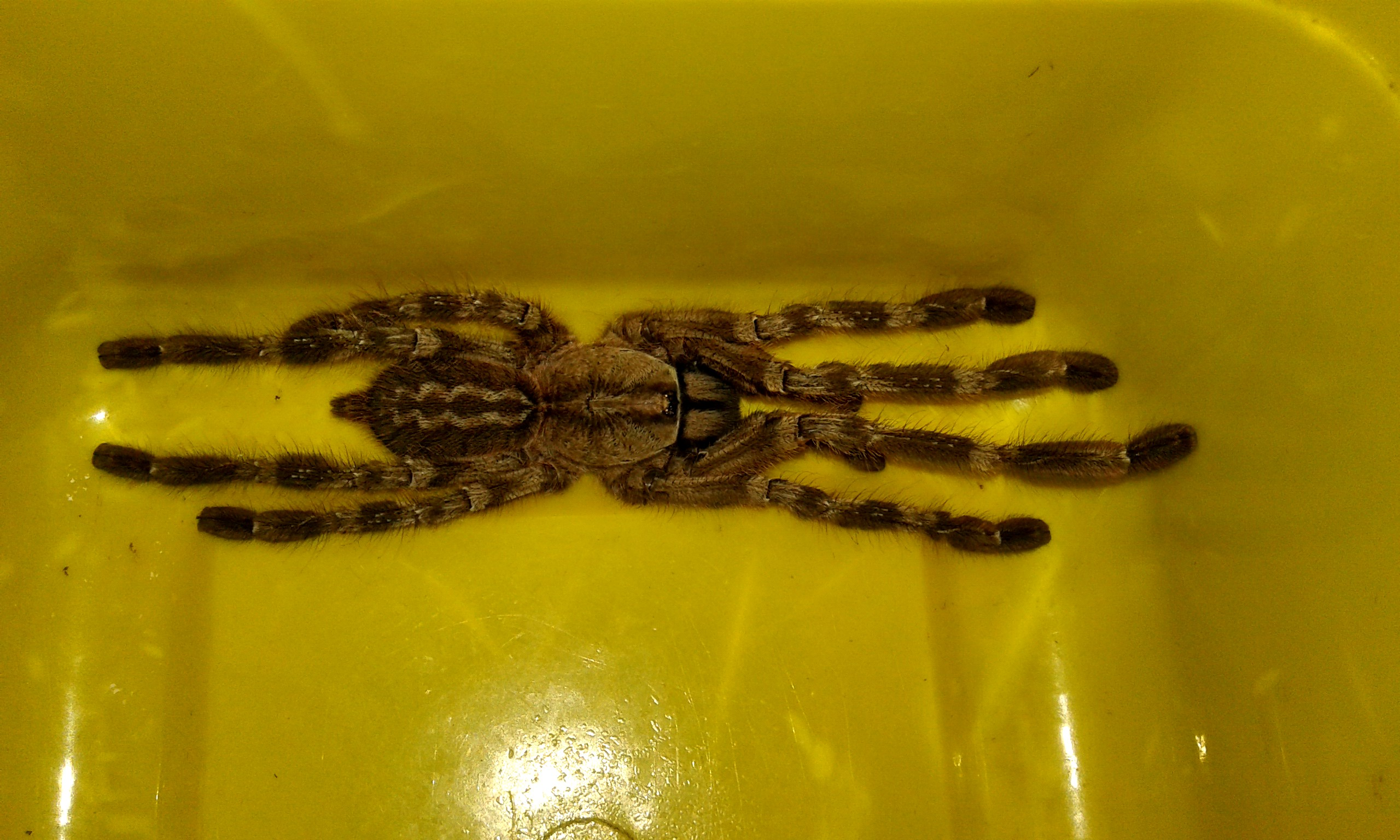
A specimen from Sri Lanka

The species can identified from other tiger spiders by prominent brushes on femurs and a prominent dark triangular stripe on the femur of fourth pair of legs in ventrally. Males are about 5 inches in length, females are larger at 6–7 in.

In females, the dorsal carapace is similar to P. fasciata. The abdomen markings are slightly darker around the joint to the peduncle. There are two lines of oblong parallel spots down the tibia. Ventrally, the legs are white in color. The first and second leg pairs have identical markings. The patella is white with a broken black band distally. The tibia is also white. In males, the dorsum is greenish brown all over the body with inconspicuous markings. Ventrally, similar to female, instead of much shorter wedge-shaped marking not merge with distal black band in fourth pair of legs.

== Ecology ==
The species is confined to the south-eastern parts and few northern parts of Sri Lanka. Inhabiting in tree hollows, under tree barks, rock crevices, not common in human habitations. Compared to other tiger spiders, this species is docile, but in extreme disturbances, will bite.
