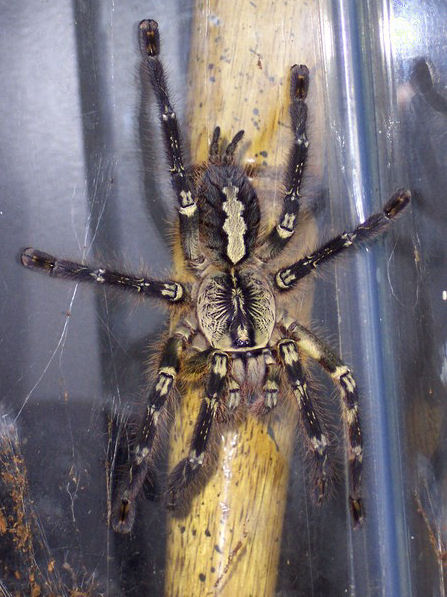
- Female Poecilotheria ornata

Conservation status
- Endangered (ESA)
- CITES Appendix II

Scientific classification
- Kingdom: Animalia
- Phylum: Arthropoda
- Subphylum: Chelicerata
- Class: Arachnida
- Order: Araneae
- Infraorder: Mygalomorphae
- Family: Theraphosidae
- Genus: Poecilotheria
- Species: P. ornata

Binomial name
- Poecilotheria ornata Pocock, 1899

= Poecilotheria ornata =

Species of spider

Poecilotheria ornata, known as the fringed ornamental or ornate tiger spider, is a large arboreal tarantula, which is endemic to Sri Lanka. Their legspan sometimes reaches 10 inches (25 cm) in females, and is probably the second largest of the genus, behind Poecilotheria rufilata.

== Name ==
The name Poecilotheria is derived from Greek "poikilos" - spotted and "therion" - wild beast. Ornata refers to "adorned to". This whole genus of arboreal tarantulas exhibits an intricate fractal-like pattern on the abdomen.

== Identification ==
The species is easily distinguishable from other tiger spiders due to greenish yellow or purplish carapace on dorsal surface. Ventrally, there is a proximal white spot on femur of fourth pair of legs.

== Description ==
=== Female ===
Dorsally, carapace has greenish yellow or purplish tinge. Femur is greenish with a purplish tinge. Tibia has two parallel lines of oblong yellow spots. All legs possess reddish brown setae and setae are more prominent on pedipalps and chelicerae.

Ventrally, first and second leg pairs are identical, with ground color yellow. Femur is also yellow. Tibia is bright yellow colored. Third and fourth leg pairs are identical. Ground color is yellow. Femur is black with centrally located large blue-grey spot.

=== Male ===
Dorsally greenish brown colored. Markings are less prominent. Ventrally, identical to female. Yellow spots can be seen on third and fourth leg pairs.

== Behavior ==
The P. ornata behavior parallels that of many arboreal spiders. In the wild the P. ornata live in holes of tall trees where they make asymmetric funnel webs. Their primary prey consists of various flying insects, which they catch manually (not in a web) and paralyze. It is not unknown for the spiders of this genus to live communally when territory, i.e. number of holes per tree, is limited.

The spider is noted to have a possibly mutualistic relationship with frogs such as Ramanella nagaoi, sharing tree holes of which some were observed to contain eggs and/or juveniles from the spider, frog, or both. As observed between frog Chiasmocleis ventrimaculata and tarantula Xenesthis immanis, the spider may protect the frog from predators while the frog protects the spider's eggs from ants.

== Bites ==
Although there has never been a recorded death from any tarantula bite this species is considered to have a medically significant bite, with venom that may cause intense pain, and extreme muscle cramping judging from the experience of keepers bitten by this species.
