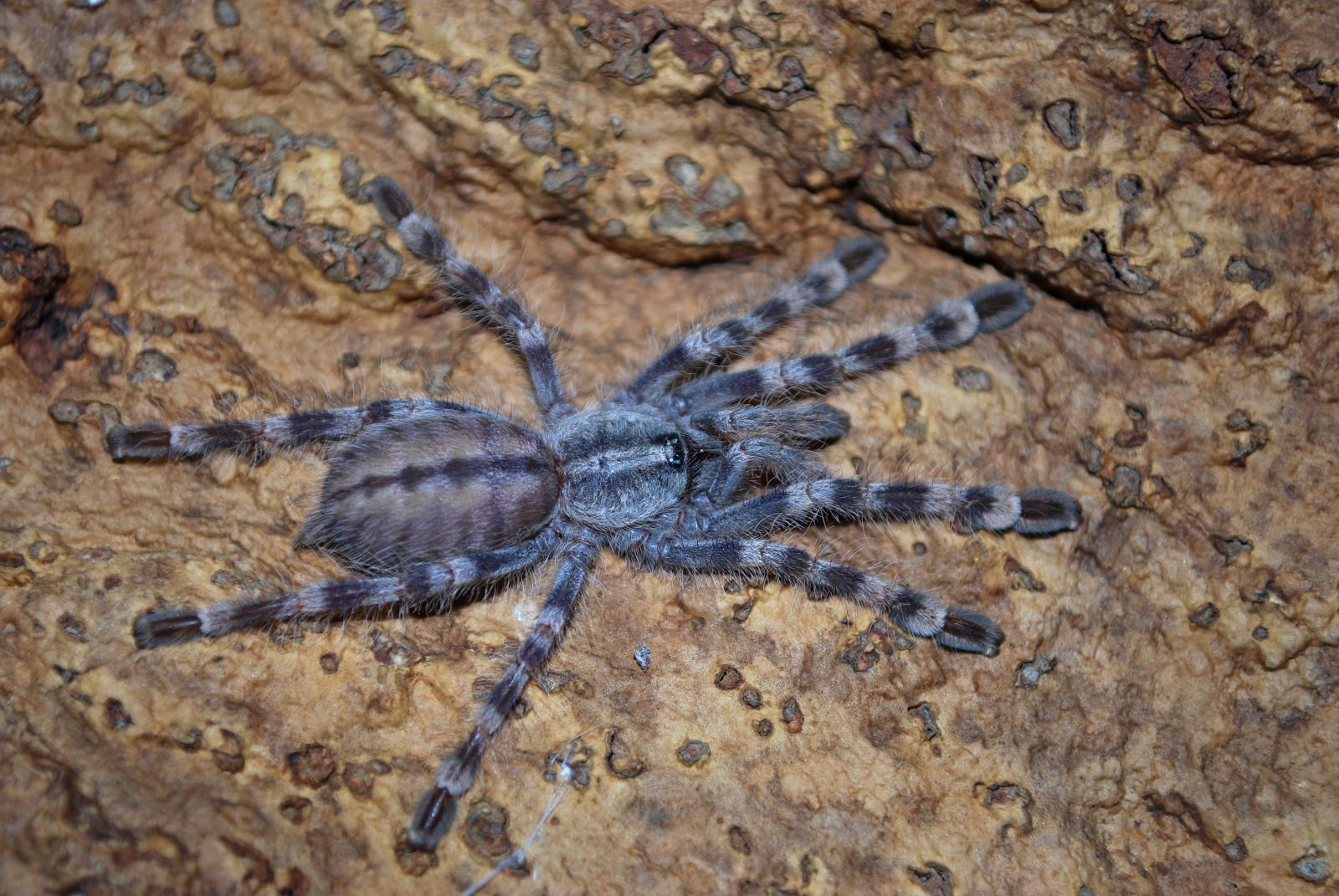
- Poecilotheria formosa

Scientific classification
- Kingdom: Animalia
- Phylum: Arthropoda
- Subphylum: Chelicerata
- Class: Arachnida
- Order: Araneae
- Infraorder: Mygalomorphae
- Family: Theraphosidae
- Genus: Poecilotheria; Simon, 1885

Type species
- Mygale fasciata (Latreille, 1804)

Species
- 16, see text

= Poecilotheria =

Genus of spiders

Poecilotheria is a genus of tarantulas native to India and Sri Lanka. It was first described by Eugène Louis Simon in 1885. They are arboreal tarantulas, commonly known as ornamental tarantulas, known for their vivid color patterns, fast movement, and potent venom compared to other tarantulas. As of 2019 all species are protected under CITES.

The genus name is a combination of the Ancient Greek "poikilos" (ποικίλος), meaning "spotted", and therion" (θηρίον), meaning "wild beast".

== Taxonomy ==
The species belonging to Poecilotheria were first documented in 1734 by Dutch zoologist Albertus Seba, when he went to Sri Lanka. He published the new spiders he saw in his illustrations of the book Albertus Seba's Thesaurus under the name of Aranea maxima ceilonica (meaning big spider from Sri Lanka). However, the most precise scientific explanation came in 1804 when Pierre André Latreille described the spider as Mygale fasciata.

After about 40 years delay, in 1850, C.L. Koch revised the generic name Mygale in to Scurria and species as Scurria fasciata. In 1885, Eugène Simon proposed the generic name Poecilotheria instead of Scurria due to species description errors with a mollusk.

There is a debate about the taxonomy of a few species. Some sources identify Poecilotheria vittata of Sri Lanka as a synonym of Poecilotheria striata of India, but in other sources both of them have been given valid species identity. The naming of Poecilotheria bara from Sri Lanka is also in debate – whether it is the same species as Poecilotheria subfusca, found in south central parts of Sri Lanka. In 2014, Ranil P. Nanayakkara, a Sri Lanka arachnologist, regarded P. vittata, P. striata, P. bara, and P. subfusca as distinct species.

=== Species ===
As of November 2025, the World Spider Catalog accepted the following species, seven from India, six from Sri Lanka and two from both countries.

==== India ====
- Poecilotheria formosa Pocock, 1899 — Salem ornamental
- Poecilotheria metallica Pocock, 1899 — Gooty sapphire ornamental
- Poecilotheria miranda Pocock, 1900 — Bengal spotted ornamental
- Poecilotheria regalis Pocock, 1899 — Indian Ornamental
- Poecilotheria rufilata Pocock, 1899 — red slate ornamental
- Poecilotheria striata Pocock, 1895 — Mysore ornamental, Pedersen's ghost ornamental
- Poecilotheria tigrinawesseli Smith, 2006 — Wessel's tiger ornamental

==== Sri Lanka ====
- Poecilotheria fasciata (Latreille, 1804) (type species) — Sri Lankan ornamental
- Poecilotheria ornata Pocock, 1899 — fringed ornamental
- Poecilotheria rajaei Nanayakkara, et al., 2012 — Mankulam pink banded ornamental
- Poecilotheria smithi Kirk, 1996 — yellow backed ornamental
- Poecilotheria subfusca Pocock, 1895 — ivory ornamental
- Poecilotheria srilankensis Nanayakkara, et al., 2020

==== Both countries ====
- Poecilotheria hanumavilasumica Smith, 2004 — Rameshwaram ornamental
- Poecilotheria vittata Pocock, 1895 — Magam ornamental

==== Junior synonyms ====
The following species were once considered to be species, but are now considered synonyms of other species by the World Spider Catalog and other sources as of November 2025:

- Poecilotheria amarasekarai = P. rajaei; regarded as distinct by other sources
- Poecilotheria bara Chamberlin, 1917 = P. subfusca; regarded as distinct by other sources
- Poecilotheria chaojii Mirza, Sanap & Bhosale, 2014 = Poecilotheria tigrinawesseli
- Poecilotheria gadgili Tikader, 1977 = P. regalis
- Poecilotheria nallamalaiensis Rao et al., 2006 = P. formosa
- Poecilotheria pederseni Kirk, 2001 = P. vittata
- Poecilotheria pococki Charpentier, 1996 = P. smithi
- Poecilotheria uniformis Strand, 1913 = P. subfusca

== Biology ==
Species of Poecilotheria are easily distinguishable from other species of family Theraphosidae due to the flattened carapace, maxilla with spines, and black teeth like tubercles. Their legs lack spines and the scopula of the legs are clearly seen. There are unique color patterns on the ventral surface, especially on the legs. The dorsal surface of the abdomen has several variegated stripes and spots of black and white. The first and fourth pair of legs are colored with striking yellow and black patterns, a feature used especially to identify up to species level.

Males and females show sexual dimorphism, which enables easy recognition. Mature males are easily recognizable by highly sclerotized sperm storage pouches called palpal bulbs. Palpal bulbs are used to inject sperm in to female's genitalia. Males are smaller than females and also more slenderly built. In males, the first pair and fourth pair of legs are of the same length, but in females, the first pair of legs are longer than the fourth pair. Males are usually more dull colored with cryptic markings and are inconspicuous. However, the folium marking on the opisthosoma is darker than that of females.

== Ecology ==
Ornamental tarantulas are nocturnal and crepuscular hunters. They come out to forage in dusk and dawn. Unlike many other spiders, they do not use a cobweb to catch prey. Instead, they are ambush predators, where they sit and wait until the prey comes closer or passes by, then follow the prey with exceptional speed, catch it, and inject venom to immobilize it.

Once the prey is secured, they roll the prey in silk and start to feed. The most common prey of tiger spiders are insects, larvae, small birds, and small mammals (e.g. bats, mice).

Several species of Poecilotheria are classed as "endangered" or "critically endangered", with the main threats being habitat loss and for at least one species, P. metallica, collection and smuggling for the pet trade.

== Conservation ==
As of 2019, all species of Poecilotheria are listed on CITES Appendix II. This means that specimens cannot be legally traded (internationally) without CITES export permits from the country of export (or CITES re-export permits if the specimens had been previously imported from another country).

== Photos ==
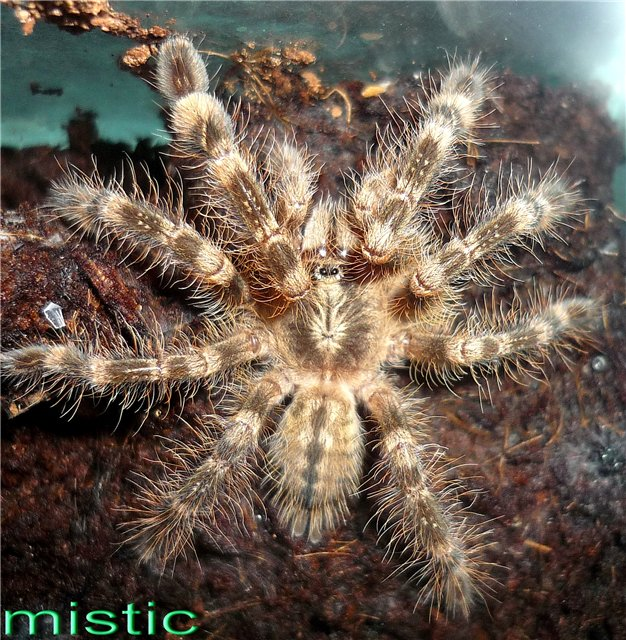
Poecilotheria subfusca.

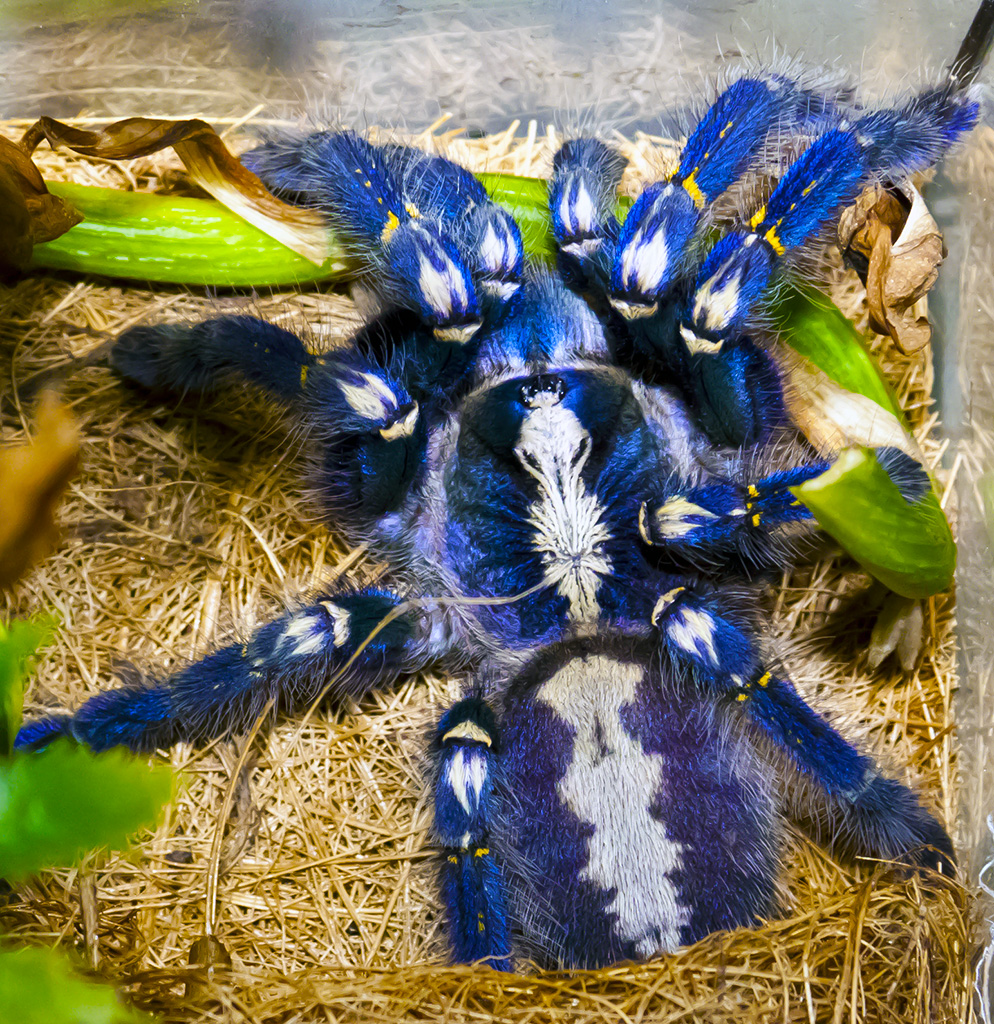
Poecilotheria metallica

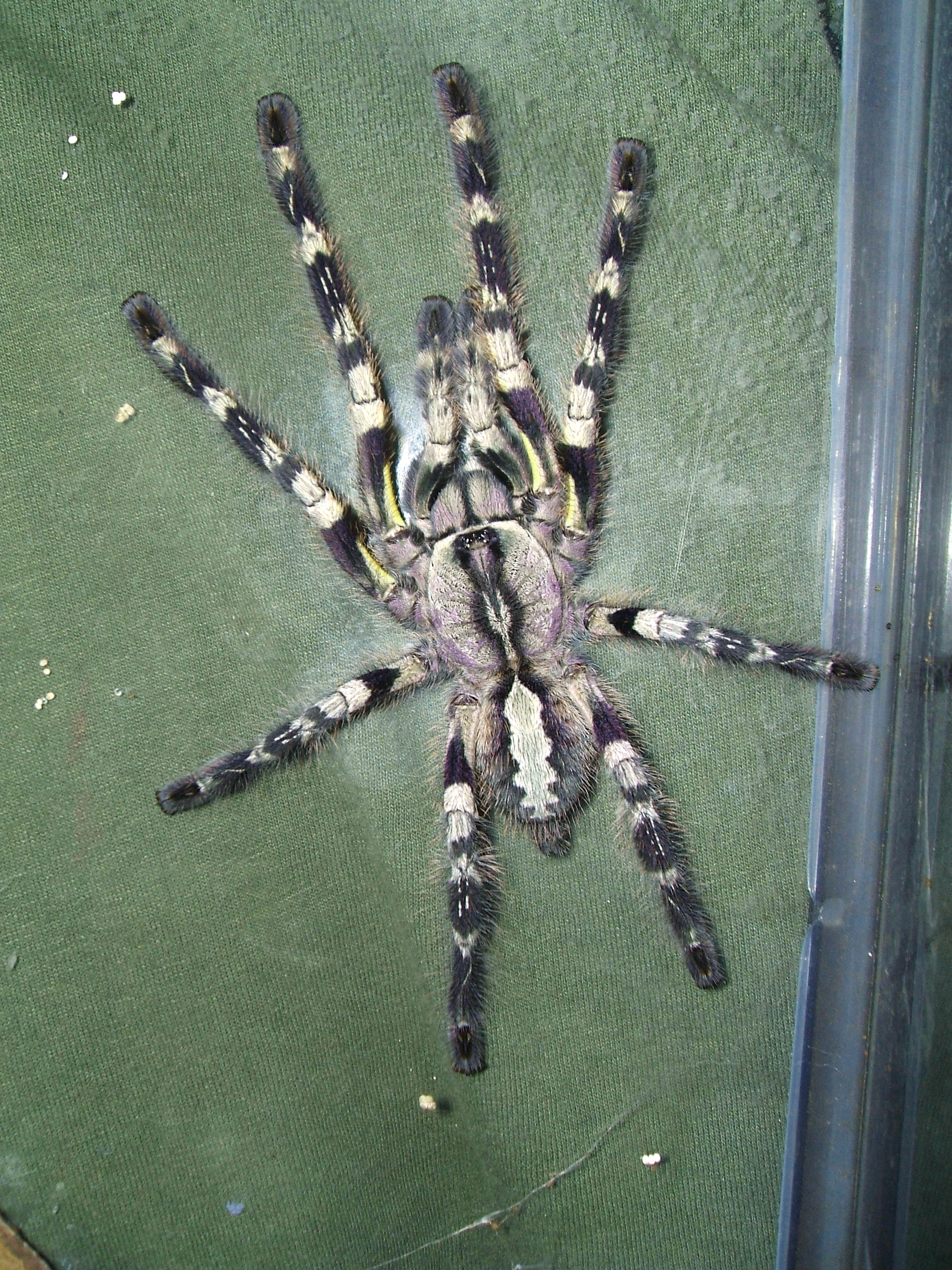
Poecilotheria regalis

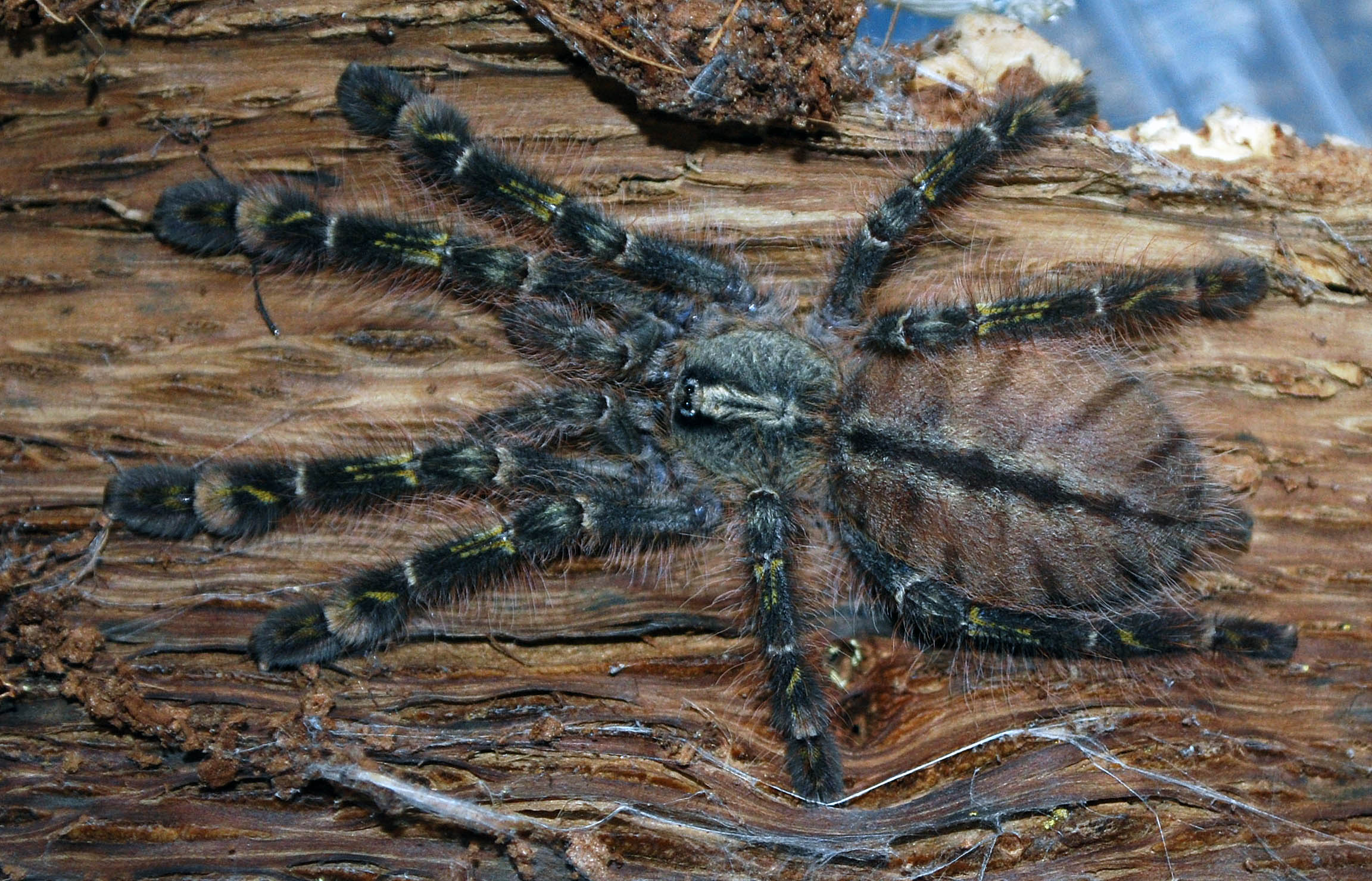
Poecilotheria rufilata

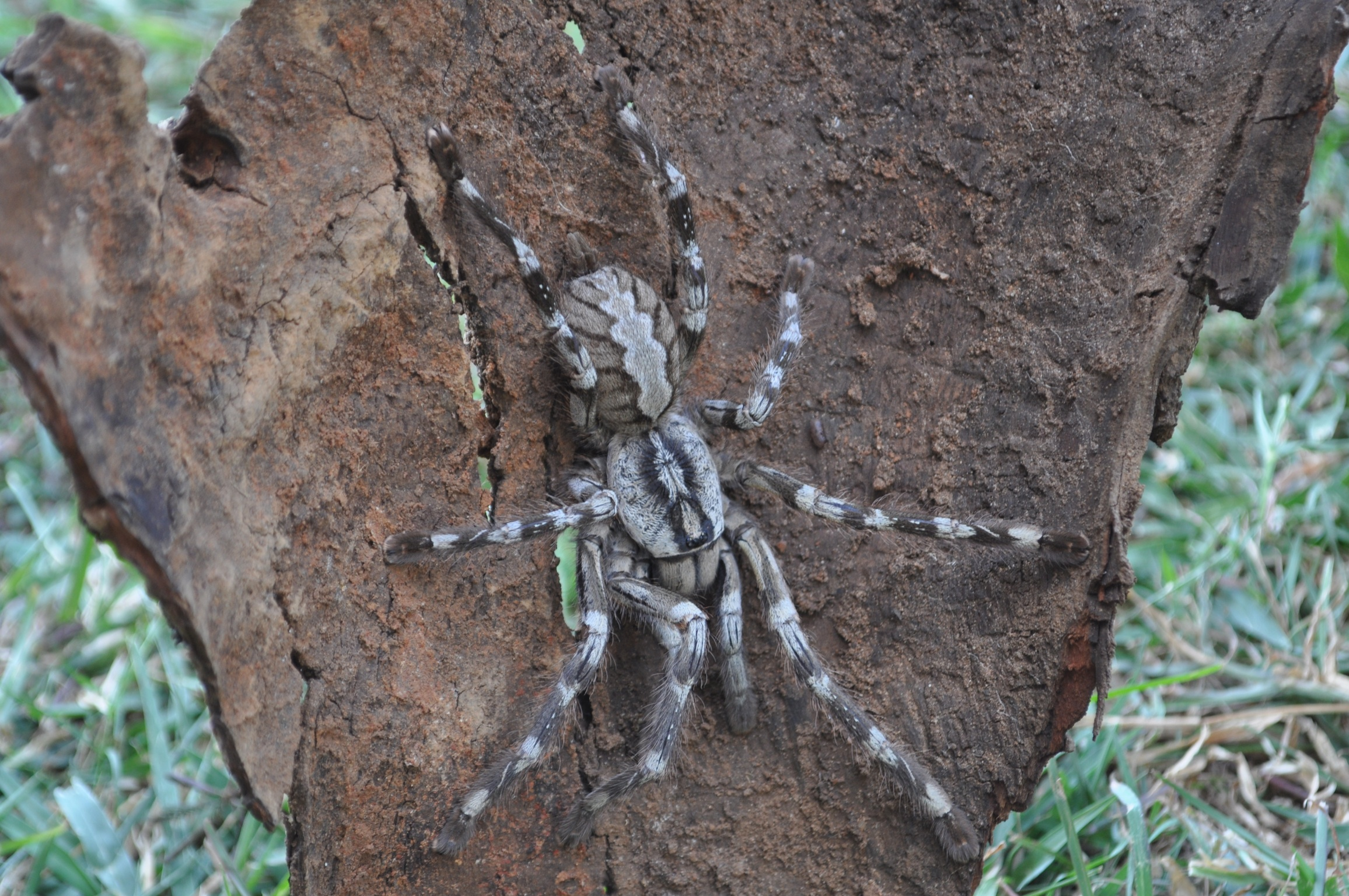
Poecilotheria rajaei
