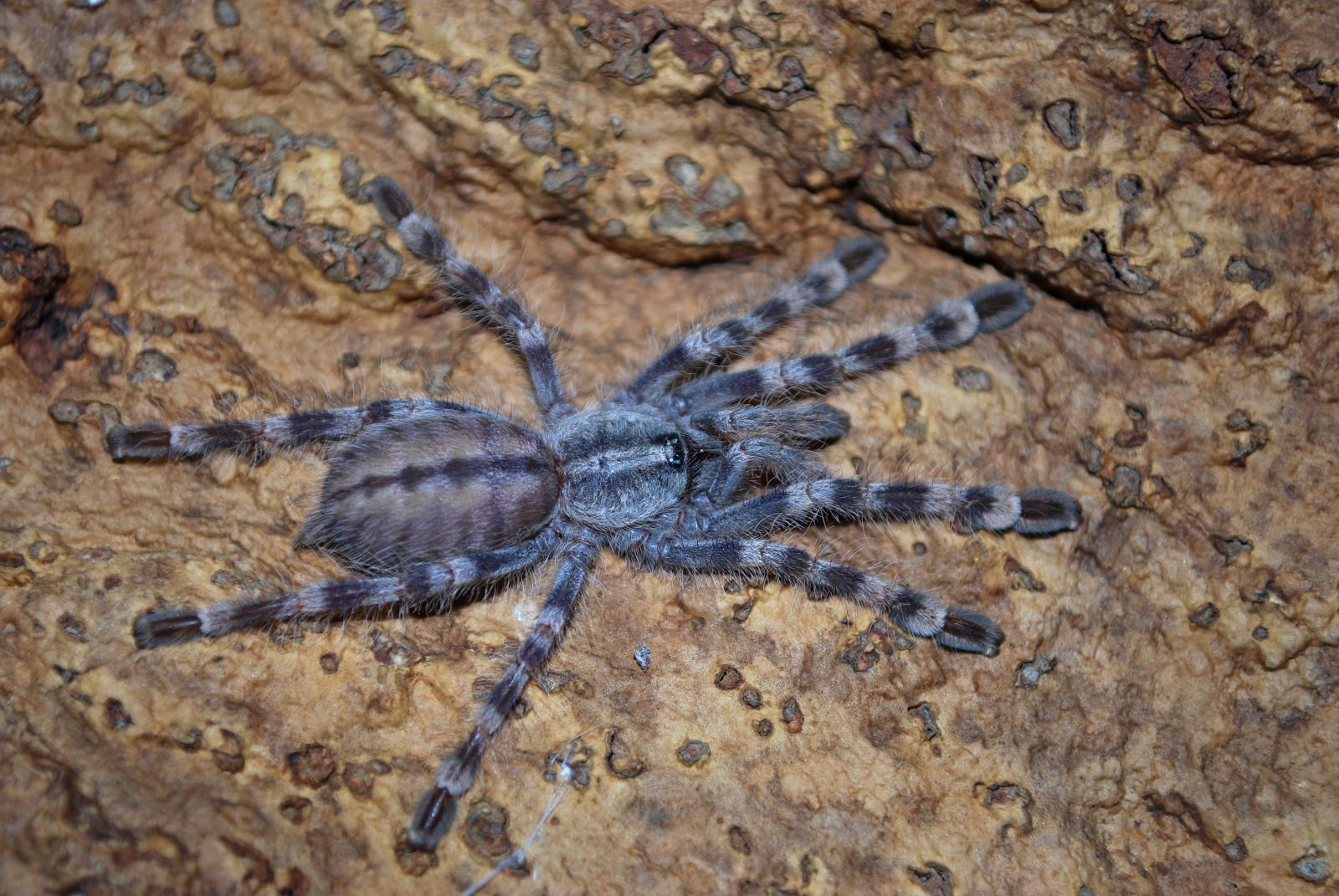

Conservation status
- Endangered (IUCN 3.1)
- CITES Appendix II (CITES)

Scientific classification
- Domain: Eukaryota
- Kingdom: Animalia
- Phylum: Arthropoda
- Subphylum: Chelicerata
- Class: Arachnida
- Order: Araneae
- Infraorder: Mygalomorphae
- Family: Theraphosidae
- Genus: Poecilotheria
- Species: P. formosa

Binomial name
- Poecilotheria formosa Pocock, 1899

Synonyms
- Poecilotheria nallamalaiensis Rao et al., 2006

= Poecilotheria formosa =

Salem ornamental

Tarantula spider species

Poecilotheria formosa is a species of tarantula, commonly known as the salem ornamental, beautiful parachute spider, or finely formed parachute spider.

== Distribution ==
P. formosa is found only in South-Eastern Ghats between Salem and Tirupathi in southern India. The population is decreasing due to habitat loss and pet trade.
