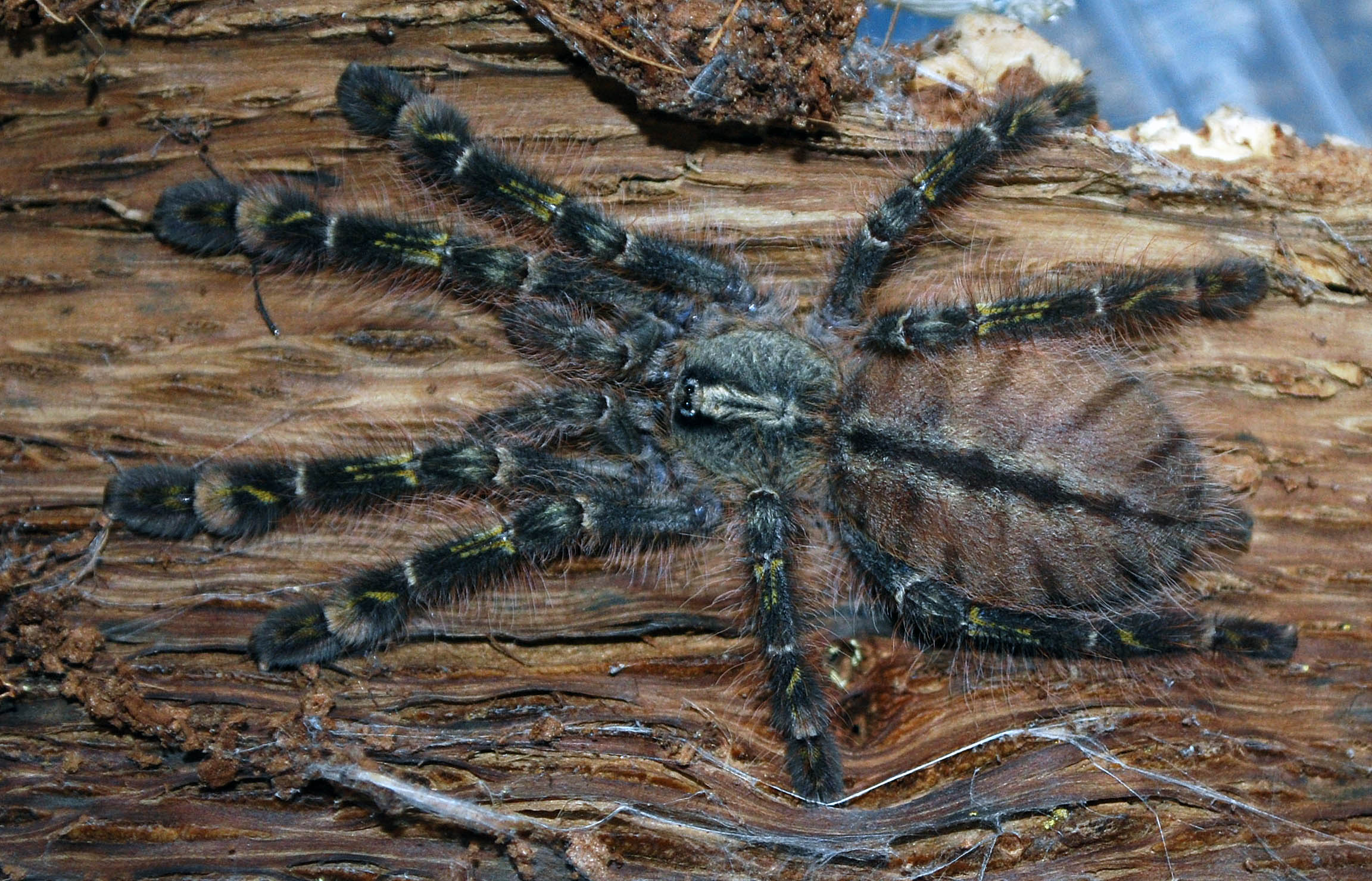

Conservation status
- Endangered (IUCN 3.1)
- CITES Appendix II

Scientific classification
- Kingdom: Animalia
- Phylum: Arthropoda
- Subphylum: Chelicerata
- Class: Arachnida
- Order: Araneae
- Infraorder: Mygalomorphae
- Family: Theraphosidae
- Genus: Poecilotheria
- Species: P. rufilata

Binomial name
- Poecilotheria rufilata Pocock, 1899

= Poecilotheria rufilata =

Red slate ornamental tarantula

Species of spider

Poecilotheria rufilata, also known as the red slate ornamental, reddish parachute spider, Travancore slate-red, or rufus parachute spider, is an arboreal tarantula. It is endemic to South Western Ghats of India. It is classed as an "endangered" species, threatened by habitat loss and smuggling for the pet trade.

== Description ==
The female is larger than the male, with a body length of about 8 cm, the male being at most 3.5 cm in body length. In measured wild-caught specimens, the longest leg of the female was up to 8 cm in total length, that of the male up to 7 cm.

In the first and fourth pairs of legs, the ground colour is yellow or green. The femur is also yellow or green proximally, ending with a black part and a thin yellow or green band. The tibia is yellow or green.

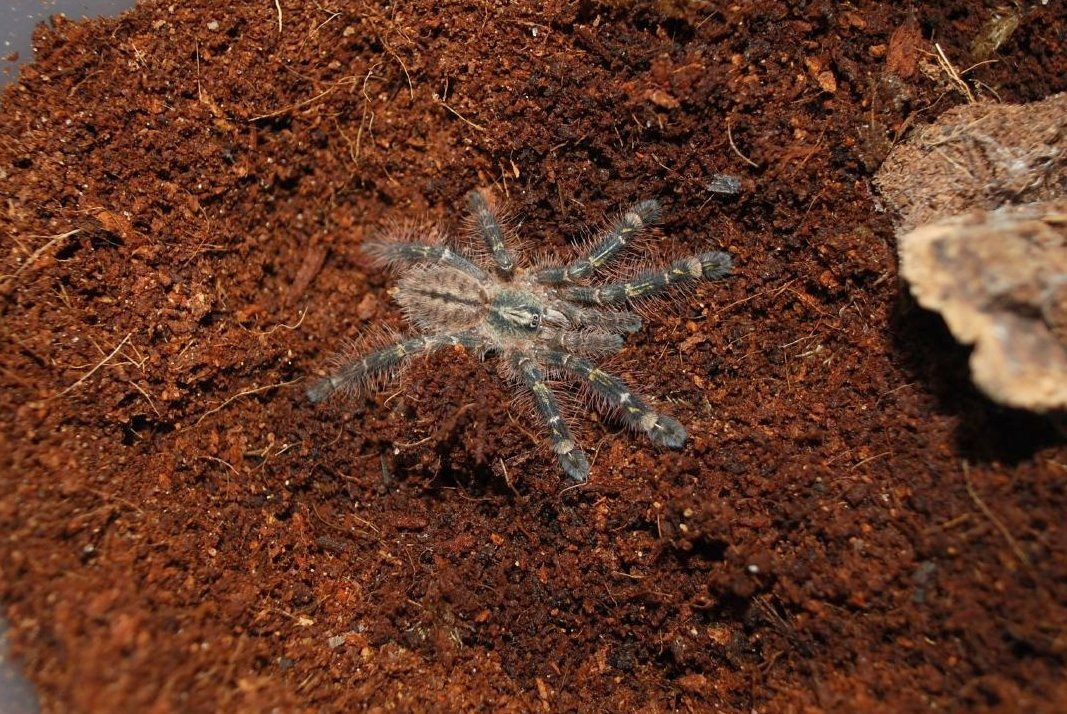
Poecilotheria rufilata

== Ecology ==
The species is confined to the south Western Ghats of India, inhabiting tree-rich environments. It sometimes enters human settlements.

It is classed as an "endangered" species, with the major threats being habitat degradation and collection for the pet trade. It is smuggled out of India for sale in Europe and America.

== As a pet ==
Poecilotheria rufilata along with others in its genus is coveted by advanced tarantula keepers for its unique coloration, fast growth, and larger size. Poecilotheria rufilata along with the more restricted Poecilotheria ornata are some of the largest arboreal tarantulas readily available. Handling is discouraged and should not be attempted, as, along with most other Old World tarantulas, they can be very skittish and defensive, and are prone to bite. Poecilotheria rufilata possesses a very potent venom, therefore specialists suggest this species to experienced owners only.
