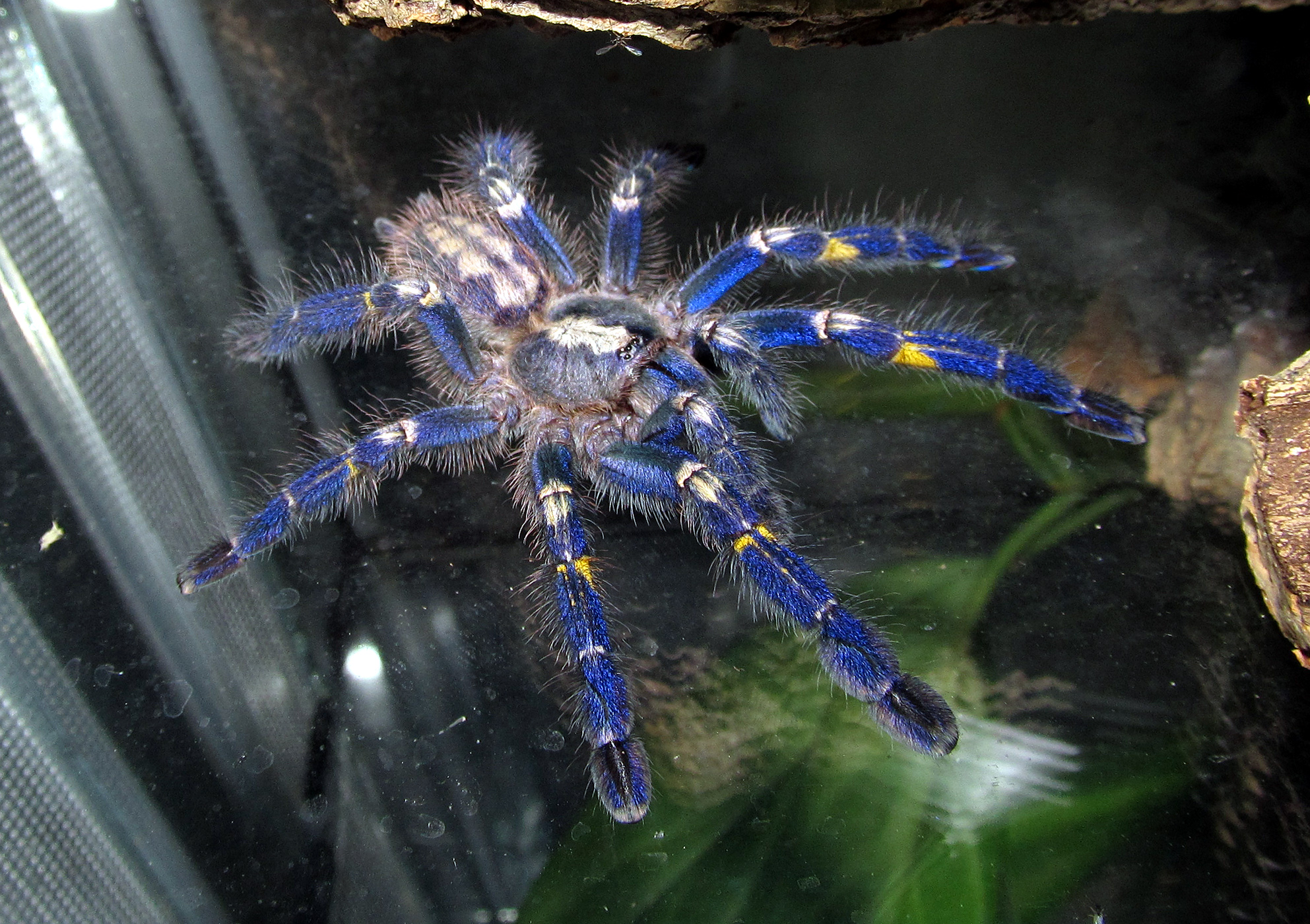
- Juvenile male

Conservation status
- Critically Endangered (IUCN 3.1)
- CITES Appendix II

Scientific classification
- Kingdom: Animalia
- Phylum: Arthropoda
- Subphylum: Chelicerata
- Class: Arachnida
- Order: Araneae
- Infraorder: Mygalomorphae
- Family: Theraphosidae
- Genus: Poecilotheria
- Species: P. metallica

Binomial name
- Poecilotheria metallica Pocock, 1899

= Poecilotheria metallica =

Species of spider

Poecilotheria metallica, also known as the peacock tarantula, or the Gooty sapphire tarantula, is an Old World species of tarantula. It is the only blue species of the genus Poecilotheria. Like others in its genus it exhibits an intricate fractal-like pattern on the abdomen. The species' natural habitat is a deciduous forest in Andhra Pradesh, in central southern India. It has been classified as Critically endangered by the International Union for Conservation of Nature (IUCN).

== Taxonomy ==
The first specimen of this spider known to science was sent to the British Museum in 1898 by H.R.P. Carter, who received it from chief engineer H.C. West of the Madras Railway. This specimen, a female individual, was discovered by West near the Indian town of Gooty, specifically in his bungalow on the north-west line of the railway. It would be studied the following year, when British Zoologist Reginald Innes Pocock determined from its distinct colouration that it represents a species which was unknown to science at the time, and gave this species the name Poecilotheria metallica.

== Description ==
Poecilotheria metallica has similar intricate geometric body coloration to other Poecilotheria species, but it is the only species in the genus to be covered in blue hair. While it is young, P. metallica is less chromatic, the coloring turns to blue as it matures. This blue is much less prominent in the mature males. Males also have more slender bodies, and their legs are longer. The definitive trait of a mature male are the revelation of emboli at the end of their pedipalps following their "mature molt." Females can be determined through molt confirmations before maturity. When full size, the leg span of P. metallica is 15–20 cm (6–8 in).

== Distribution ==
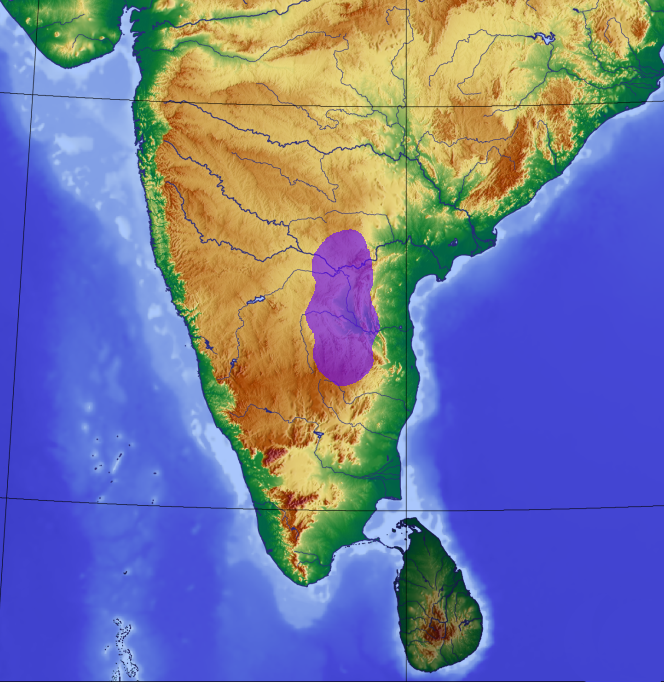
Distribution of Poecilotheria metallica

Poecilotheria metallica is found only in a small area of less than 100 square kilometres (39 sq mi), a reserve forest that is nonetheless highly disturbed. Surveys of adjacent forest have failed to observe this species. The type specimen was discovered in a railway timber yard in Gooty about 100 km southwest of its known range, but it is believed to have been transported there by train. In 2019 multiple individuals were sighted in the reserved forest near Gingee thus extending its range to the Eastern ghats of Tamil Nadu.

== Behavior ==
Poecilotheria metallica's behavior parallels that of many arboreal spiders. In the wild, P. metallica lives in holes of tall trees where it makes asymmetric funnel webs. The primary prey consists of various flying insects. Spiders of this genus may live communally when territory, i.e. the number of holes per tree, is limited. The species is skittish and will try to flee first, and will also flee when light shines upon it, as it is a photosensitive species. Under provocation, however, members of the species may bite.

== Longevity ==
Females typically live for 11 to 12 years, or, in rare instances, for up to 15 years. Males live for 3 to 4 years.

== Venom ==
There has never been a recorded human death from its bite. However, P. metallica's bite is considered medically significant, with venom that may cause intense pain, judging from the experience of keepers bitten by other spiders in the genus. The vast majority are "dry bites," where no venom is injected into the handler. The mechanical effects of the bite can still be worrisome, as an adult's fangs can reach nearly 3/4 of an inch in length. P. metallica can move rapidly and may defend itself when cornered. Venom may produce a heart-rate increase followed by sweating, headache, stinging, cramping, or swelling. Effects can last for up to a week.

== Coloration ==
As with other tarantulas with blue hair, the vivid colors of P. metallica are produced by quasi-periodic perforated multilayer nanostructures. Structural colours are usually highly iridescent, changing color when viewed from different angles. Some species of blue tarantulas have hairs with a "special flower-like" structure which may reduce iridescence. Given that many tarantulas express nearly a full suite of opsins found in other colourful spiders with colour vision, blue colors could potentially function in mate-choice or contests for mates.

== Common names ==
P. metallica is also known as the Gooty sapphire ornamental tree spider, Gooty sapphire, and Gooty tarantula. Other common names are metallic tarantula, peacock parachute spider, or peacock tarantula.

== As pets ==
P. metallica has been bred in captivity for more than ten years and is popular with tarantula enthusiasts, and has a high demand due to its attractive coloration. It sometimes priced above $500 in the United States, but as a spiderling is typically between $100 and $200. As with most tarantulas, the spider's sex can influence price - females generally being more expensive because of their longer life. Members of the species are hardy, relatively fast-growing spiders that are generally fed crickets, but may also eat moths, grasshoppers and cockroaches. P. metallica measures between 15 and 20 cm (6 and 8 in) in legspan when fully grown. In captivity, humid environments with temperatures between 18 and 24 °C (64 and 75 °F) and a humidity level of 75 to 85% are preferred.

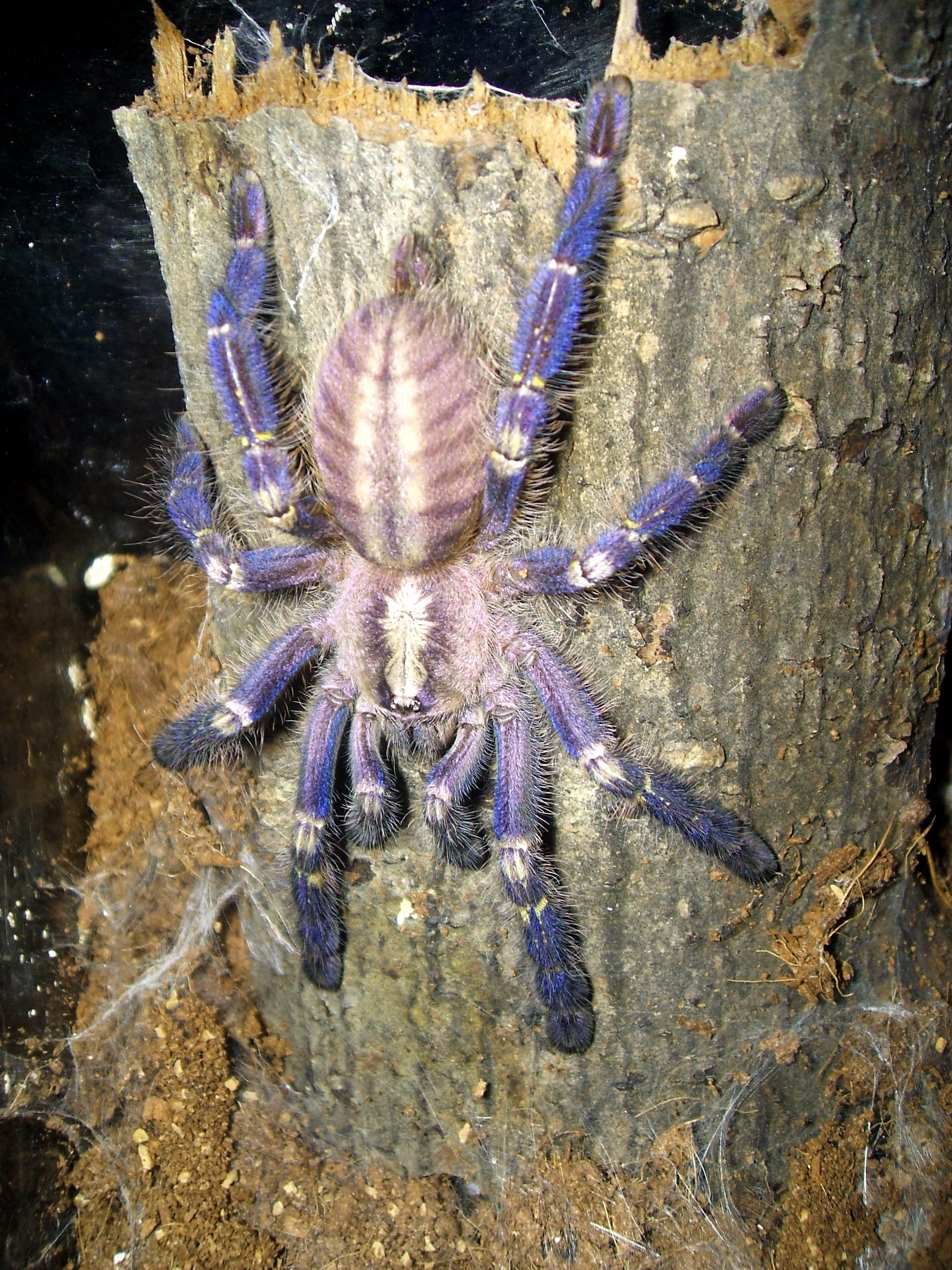
Poecilotheria metallica juvenile

This is a very fast, sometimes defensive tarantula that has the potential for medically significant venom.

== Conservation ==
P. metallica is classified as Critically Endangered by the International Union for Conservation of Nature (IUCN) due to its occurrence in a single, small area in which habitat is rapidly degrading due to logging and firewood harvesting. Another threat identified by IUCN assessors is the collection of specimens for pet trade. Population size is unknown, but the combination of its small natural range and the habitat threats indicates a declining population trend.

In April 2026, a dedicated, scientific survey was initiated by the Andhra Pradesh Forest Department in collaboration with the Eastern Ghats Wildlife Society, and with Wingham Wildlife Park, UK as a knowledge and technical partner.

Wingham has experience in maintaining captive populations of Peacock Tarantula and will be offering its scientific expertise for the survey of the species within Nagarjunasagar Srisailam Tiger Reserve (NSTR). The species is the only blue species of genus Poecilotheria. The status survey of the species will map its habitat and population: How many are left, where they live and conditions needed for their survival.

The Peacock Tarantula is listed under Schedule II of India’s Wildlife Protection Act, 1972, which provides it high protection against illegal collection, trade, and exploitation.

According to the Andhra Pradesh Forest Department, "the Peacock Tarantula plays an important role as a predator of insects thereby helping to regulate pest populations and maintain ecological balance within its forest habitat. The findings will play a crucial role in informing long-term conservation strategies, habitat management plans, and policy interventions for the protection of this unique species."
