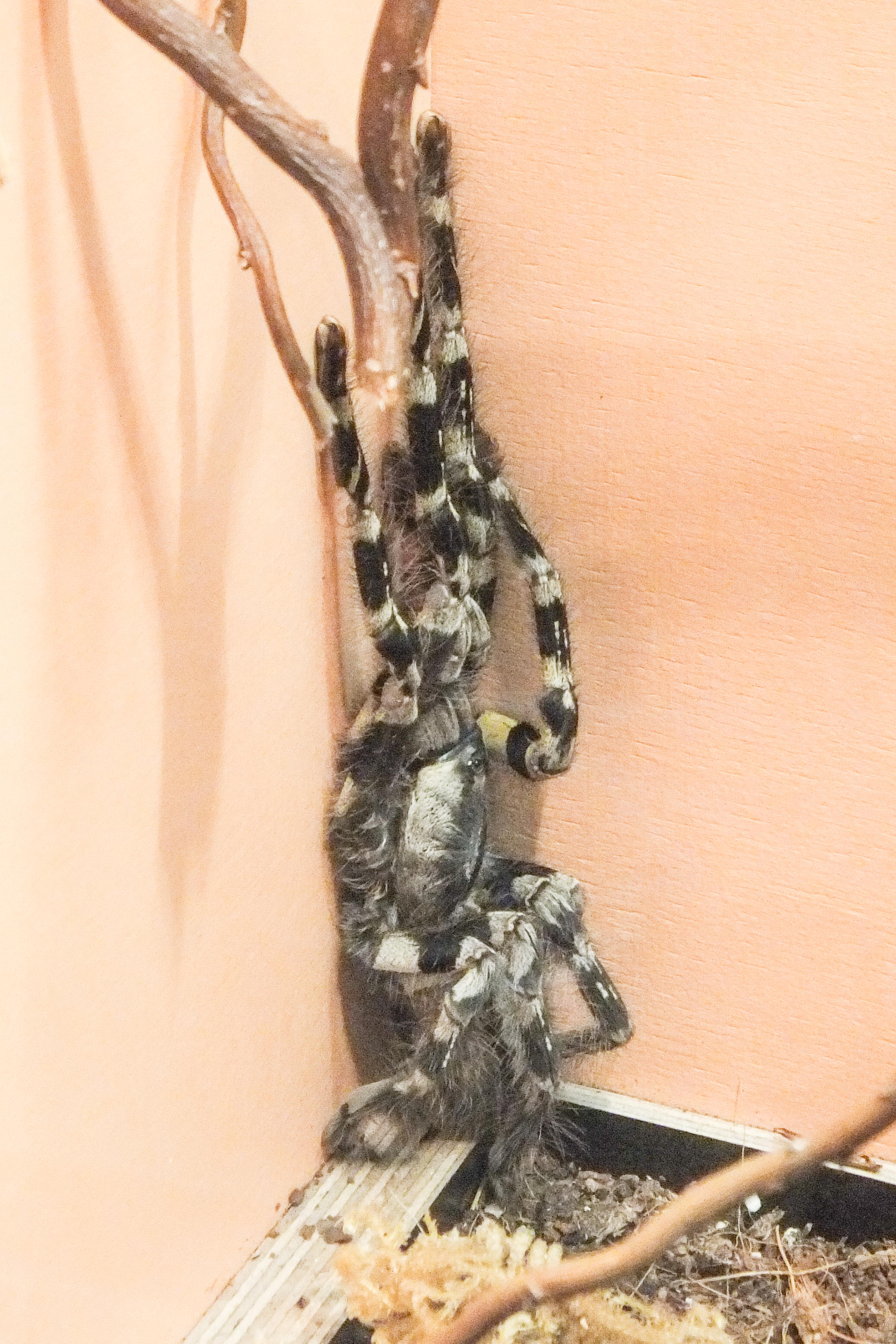
- Poecilotheria smithi in the "SPIDERS" exposition at the Museo di storia naturale Giacomo Doria

Conservation status
- Critically Endangered (IUCN 3.1)
- CITES Appendix II

Scientific classification
- Kingdom: Animalia
- Phylum: Arthropoda
- Subphylum: Chelicerata
- Class: Arachnida
- Order: Araneae
- Infraorder: Mygalomorphae
- Family: Theraphosidae
- Genus: Poecilotheria
- Species: P. smithi

Binomial name
- Poecilotheria smithi Kirk, 1996

Synonyms
- Poecilotheria pococki Charpentier, 1996

= Poecilotheria smithi =

Species of spider

Poecilotheria smithi, or the yellow-backed ornamental, is a species of large arboreal tarantulas. It is endemic to Sri Lanka and considered to be critically endangered.

== Identification ==
The species can be distinguished from other tiger spiders by all black leg parts (coxa, trochanter, femur) with prominent brushes on the femur.

== Description ==
=== Female ===
Dorsally, the carapace is dark brown in color. The patella is greyish, the tibia is brownish black and the tarsus is brownish, with a v-shaped light patch proximally.

Ventrally, the first and second leg pairs are identical. The coxa, femur and trochanter are all black, with a thin white distal band on the femur. The patella is white and the third and fourth leg pairs are identical.

=== Male ===
Dorsally, the spider is greenish brown. Folio markings are slightly darker. Ventrally, it is similar to female.

== Ecology ==
The yellow-backed ornamental is one of the rarest tiger spiders found on the island, where it is confined to the Haragama area in Kandy, with very few sightings from the region of Matale. It is highly restricted due to habitat destruction. The species is docile and not as aggressive as other tiger spiders. This makes it one of the popular pet spiders in the world.
