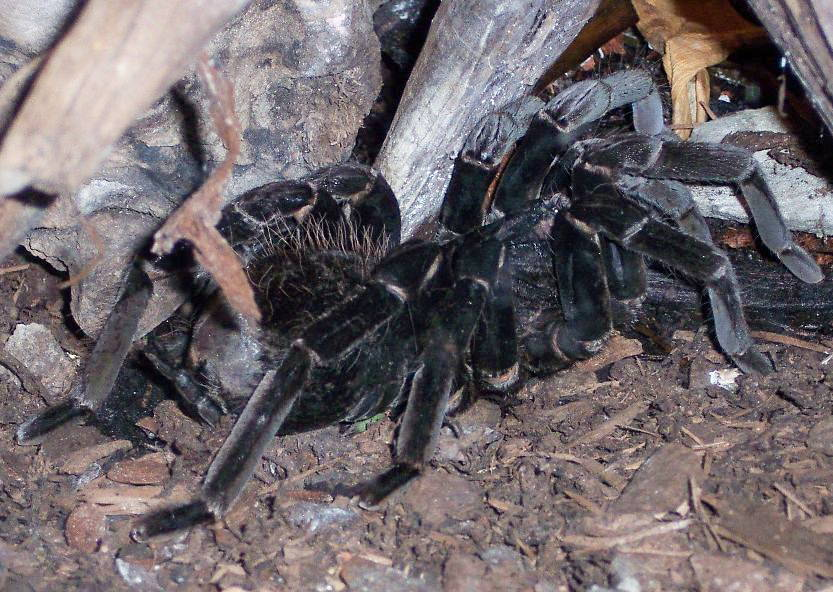
- X. immanis

Scientific classification
- Kingdom: Animalia
- Phylum: Arthropoda
- Subphylum: Chelicerata
- Class: Arachnida
- Order: Araneae
- Infraorder: Mygalomorphae
- Family: Theraphosidae
- Genus: Xenesthis; Simon, 1891

Type species
- X. immanis (Ausserer, 1875)

Species
- 5, see text

= Xenesthis =

Genus of spiders

Xenesthis is a genus of tarantulas that was first described by Eugène Louis Simon in 1891. As of February 2024 it contains five species, found in Colombia and Venezuela, though it was previously considered to be found in Panama.

== Diagnosis ==
Their distinguishing factor is based on the scopulae of the metatarsus 4 is covering nearly the entire length and circumference of the segment. At the time it was the only known New World tarantula genus to own this trait, which is not the case today.

== Species ==
As of February 2024 it contains 5 species according to the World Spider Catalog:

- Xenesthis avanzadora Sherwood, Gabriel, Peñaherrera-R., Brescovit & Lucas, 2023 – Venezuela
- Xenesthis colombiana Simon, 1891 (Type) – Colombia
- Xenesthis immanis (Ausserer, 1875) – Colombia and Venezuela
- Xenesthis intermedia Schiapelli & Gerschman, 1945 – Venezuela
- Xenesthis monstrosa Pocock, 1903 – Colombia

=== Transferred to other genera ===
- Xenesthis cubana Franganillo, 1930 → Citharacanthus spinicrus
