= Poecilotheria miranda =

Conservation status
- Endangered (IUCN 3.1)
- CITES Appendix II

Scientific classification
- Kingdom: Animalia
- Phylum: Arthropoda
- Subphylum: Chelicerata
- Class: Arachnida
- Order: Araneae
- Infraorder: Mygalomorphae
- Family: Theraphosidae
- Genus: Poecilotheria
- Species: P. miranda

Binomial name
- Poecilotheria miranda Pocock, 1900

Species of spider

Poecilotheria miranda, also known as the Bengal ornamental, is a species of tarantula. The species is endemic to India.

== Distribution ==
Endemic to India, this tiger spider is the least observed from all. They are known only from Chhota Nagpur region.

== Identification ==
Both first and fourth leg pairs are identically marked, where femur is black with a thin distal white band. Patella is whitish cream. Tibia whitish proximally, with a black band distally.
