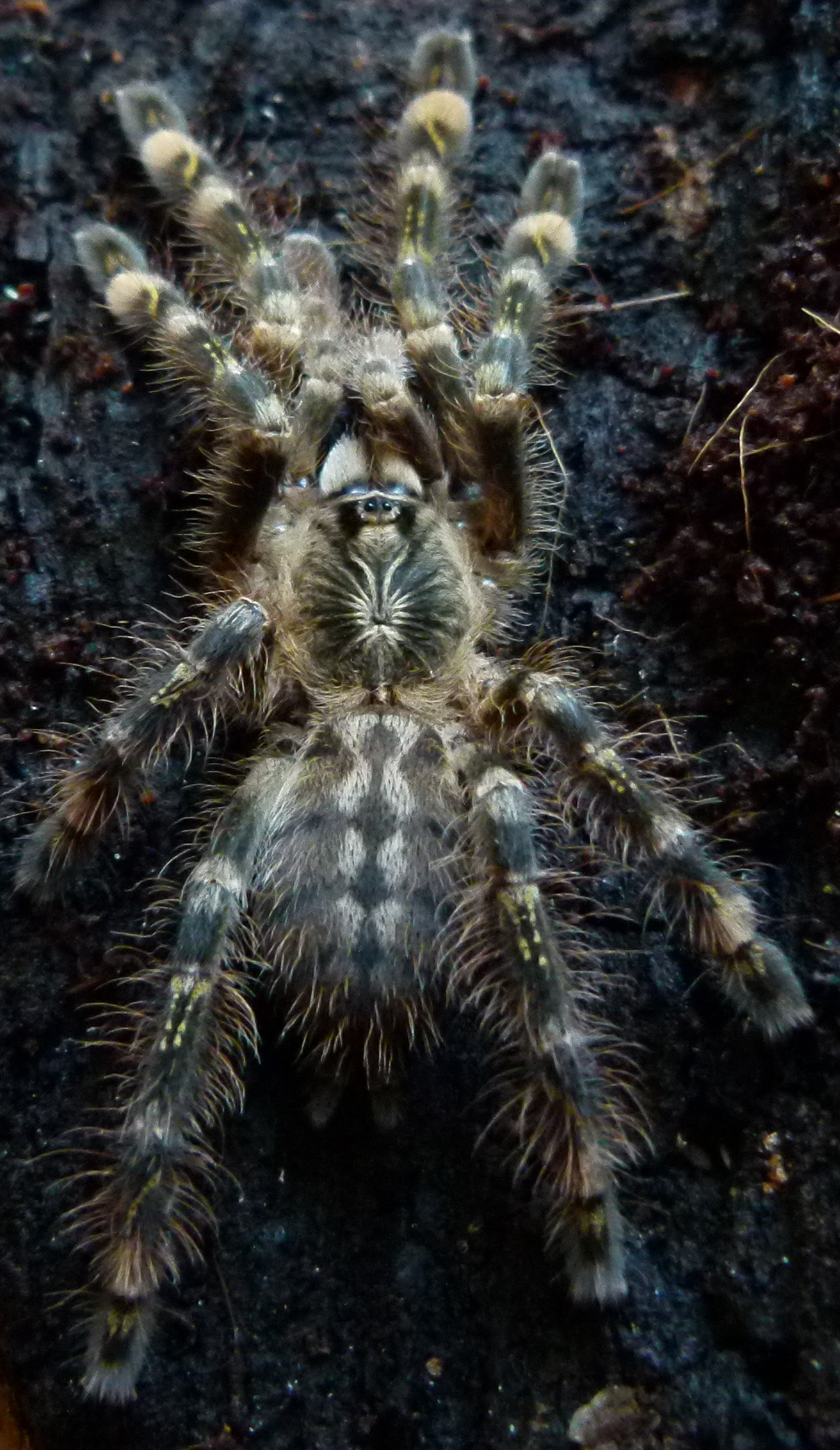
- Young female

Conservation status
- Endangered (ESA)
- CITES Appendix II

Scientific classification
- Kingdom: Animalia
- Phylum: Arthropoda
- Subphylum: Chelicerata
- Class: Arachnida
- Order: Araneae
- Infraorder: Mygalomorphae
- Family: Theraphosidae
- Genus: Poecilotheria
- Species: P. subfusca

Binomial name
- Poecilotheria subfusca Pocock, 1895

Synonyms
- Poecilotheria uniformis Strand, 1913; Poecilotheria bara Chamberlin, 1917

= Poecilotheria subfusca =

Species of spider

Poecilotheria subfusca, or the ivory ornamental, is a spider in the tarantula family, Theraphosidae. It is endemic to Sri Lanka. As of February 2019, the World Spider Catalog regarded Poecilotheria bara as a synonym. Other sources, particularly in the pet trade, have historically treated highland and lowland forms as distinct species, with the lowland forms often referred to as P. bara.

== Description ==
The female is larger than the male, with a body length of 8–9 cm, while males measure approximately 6–7 cm. The species can be distinguished from other members of the genus by its large, dark opisthosoma and a folium pattern consisting of three linked dark spots that extend halfway down the opisthosoma.

The female carapace is dorsally dark brown with pale margins, forming a starburst-like pattern. The chelicerae are creamy in color. All four leg pairs are similar in appearance: the femur is dark brown to blackish with a pale band, the patella is creamy, and the tibia bears two parallel rows of elongated pale spots. Ventrally, the body is pale brown with darker maxillae.

Males are generally paler, with subdued dorsal markings and metallic brown coloration on the legs. Ventrally, they resemble females.

=== Coloration and defensive display ===
As with other members of the genus Poecilotheria, the contrasting pattern of pale white or grey markings against a dark background is thought to function as a defensive visual signal. When threatened, individuals may expose the legs and ventral surfaces, displaying high-contrast banding that can startle or deter potential predators. This form of visual warning is characteristic of arboreal Poecilotheria species and is considered an important component of their antipredator strategy.

=== Size and leg span ===
Adult females typically reach a diagonal leg span of approximately 15–20 cm, with males slightly smaller. Growth rate is considered moderate to fast, depending on environmental conditions and food availability.

== Habitat and ecology ==
Poecilotheria subfusca is a strictly arboreal species inhabiting forested regions of Sri Lanka. It occupies mature trees, favoring natural cavities, hollows, fissures beneath loose bark, and occasionally abandoned rot holes or woodpecker cavities. The species shows a strong association with old-growth or well-established secondary forest, where stable humidity and vertical structure are present.

Both lowland and montane forest habitats are utilized. Highland populations occur in cooler, humid montane regions at higher elevations, whereas lowland populations inhabit warmer forest zones at lower elevations. In all habitats, individuals rely on consistent canopy cover, high ambient humidity, and minimal disturbance.

The spider constructs a silken retreat within tree cavities and uses nearby bark surfaces as ambush sites for prey. Activity is primarily nocturnal, with individuals remaining concealed during daylight hours.

=== Environmental tolerance ===
Temperature tolerance varies slightly between populations:

- Highland populations are associated with cooler conditions, typically ranging from approximately 18–22 °C, with high humidity.
- Lowland populations occur in warmer environments, commonly between 24 and 29 °C.

Prolonged exposure to excessive heat or low humidity is considered detrimental, particularly for highland-associated individuals.

== Behaviour ==
Compared to other Poecilotheria species, P. subfusca is highly agile and reactive, capable of rapid vertical and lateral movement. When disturbed, it typically retreats quickly into tree cavities, but may bite if provoked.

The species has been documented in a possible mutualistic association with frogs such as Ramanella nagaoi, sharing tree holes that may contain eggs or juveniles of either species. The spider may deter predators, while the frog may reduce ant predation on spider eggs.

== Venom ==
Like all members of the genus Poecilotheria, Poecilotheria subfusca is an Old World tarantula lacking urticating hairs and relying primarily on venom for defense. The venom is considered medically significant.

Juveniles are generally shy and easily startled, which can lead to the misconception that adults behave similarly. Adult specimens are reported to be more defensive and reactive, with a higher likelihood of biting when threatened.

The species is known for extremely rapid strike speed, with bites occurring with little visible warning. It is also capable of rapid jumping and multidirectional movement, increasing the risk of accidental contact.

Although no confirmed fatalities have been attributed to P. subfusca envenomation, bite reports involving closely related Poecilotheria species describe severe systemic symptoms, including intense localized pain, radiating discomfort, and prolonged muscle cramps or spasms lasting days to weeks. As a result, handling is strongly discouraged.

== Conservation ==
Poecilotheria subfusca is listed as Endangered under the U.S. Endangered Species Act and is included in Appendix II of CITES. The primary threat to the species is habitat loss caused by deforestation, logging, agricultural expansion, and forest fragmentation in Sri Lanka.

Because the species depends on mature trees with suitable cavities, the removal of old-growth forest has a disproportionate impact on population viability. Collection for the international pet trade has also contributed to population pressure, leading to increased regulation and export controls.
