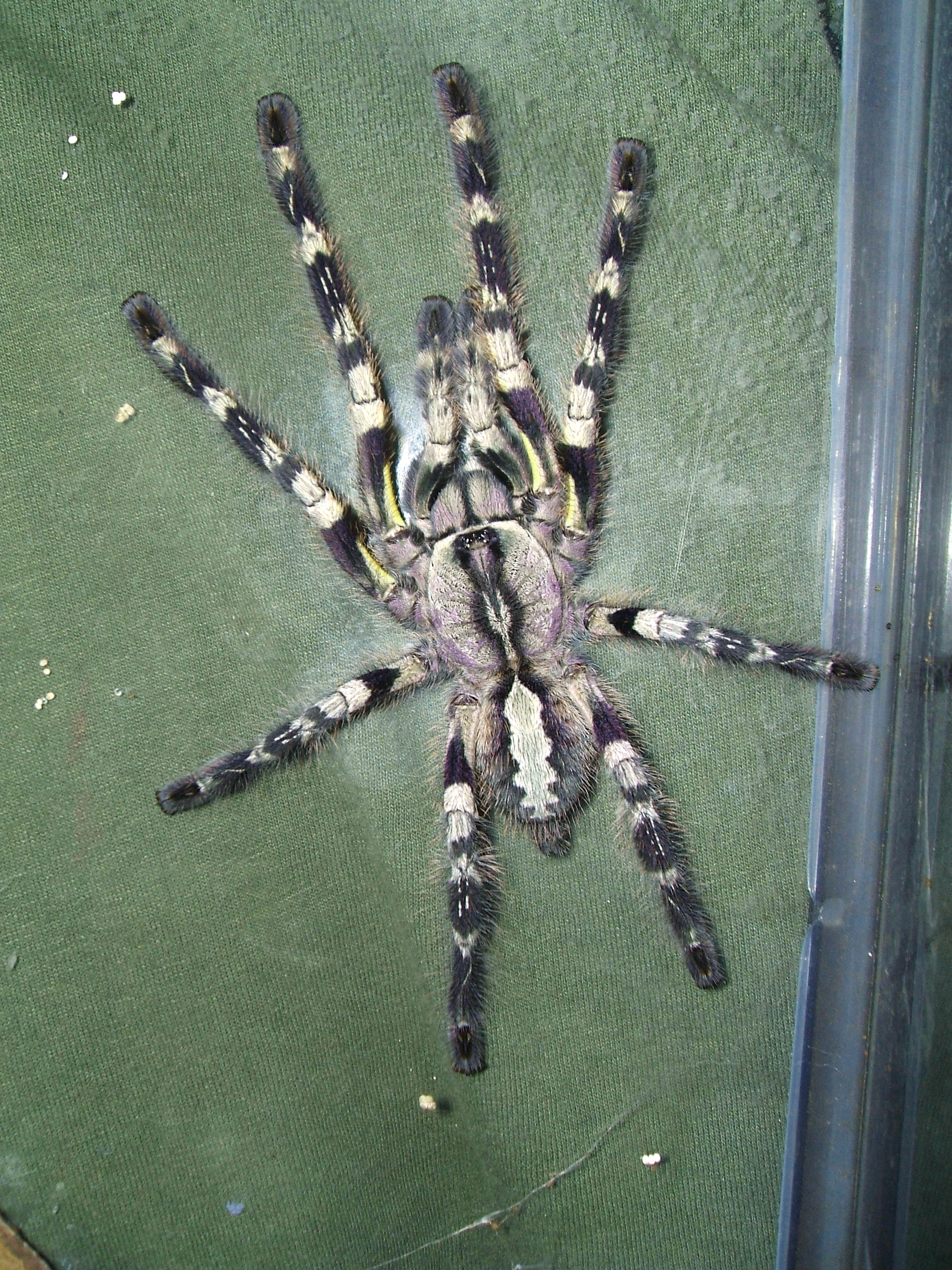

Conservation status
- Least Concern (IUCN 3.1)
- CITES Appendix II

Scientific classification
- Kingdom: Animalia
- Phylum: Arthropoda
- Subphylum: Chelicerata
- Class: Arachnida
- Order: Araneae
- Infraorder: Mygalomorphae
- Family: Theraphosidae
- Genus: Poecilotheria
- Species: P. regalis

Binomial name
- Poecilotheria regalis Pocock, 1899

Synonyms
- Ornithoctonus gadgili Tikader, 1977

= Poecilotheria regalis =

Species of arachnid

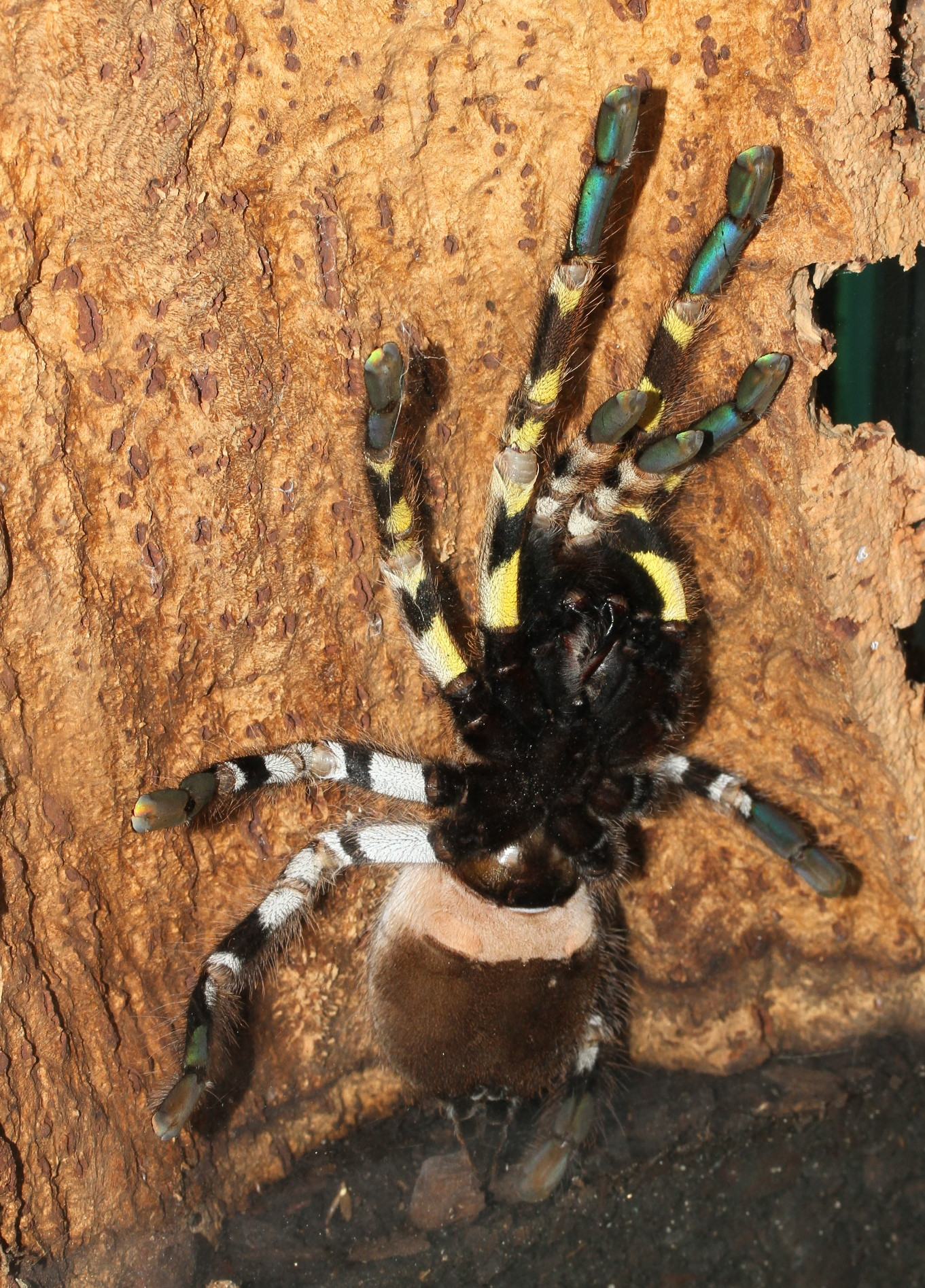
Ventral view. Note brightly colored patches on front four legs, used in threat displays.

Poecilotheria regalis is a species of arboreal tarantula and is found in parts of India. The common name for this spider is Indian ornamental tree spider, or simply Indian ornamental. It is one of the most popular arboreal tarantulas for amateur collectors. Their leg span sometimes exceeds 7 inches (18 cm).

== Name ==
The name Poecilotheria is derived from Greek "poikilos" - spotted and "therion" - wild beast. Regalis refers to "royal". This whole genus of arboreal tarantulas exhibits an intricate fractal-like pattern on the abdomen. The spider's natural habitat is primarily Southeastern India.

== Behavior ==
The behavior of P. regalis parallels that of many arboreal spiders. In the wild individuals live in holes in tall trees where they make asymmetric funnel webs. Their primary prey consists of various flying insects, which they seize in flight and paralyze. It is not unknown for the spiders of this genus to live communally when territory, i.e. the number of holes per tree, is limited. They tend to be quite defensive spiders.

== Bites ==
Although there has never been a recorded death from any tarantula bite, this species is considered to have a medically significant bite, with venom that may cause intense pain, judging from the experience of keepers bitten by other spiders from this genus. They move rapidly and, although they generally prefer flight to fight, they may attack when cornered. In addition to the direct effects of the venom, the large fangs can produce puncture wounds which themselves can lead to secondary bacterial infection if not properly treated. There has never been a single reported case of anaphylactic shock from tarantula venom, and it is very likely that they do not contain the proteins needed to enact the potentially deadly allergic reaction.

== In captivity ==
Poecilotheria regalis is a popular pet among tarantula enthusiasts. Despite its speed and potent venom, this tarantula is often sought for its distinctive appearance. As with most other tarantulas in captivity, Poecilotheria regalis is fed crickets, grasshoppers, and the adult specimen can be occasionally fed small rodents. A female specimen can live upwards of 12 years, males usually have a shorter lifespan of 3–5 years.
