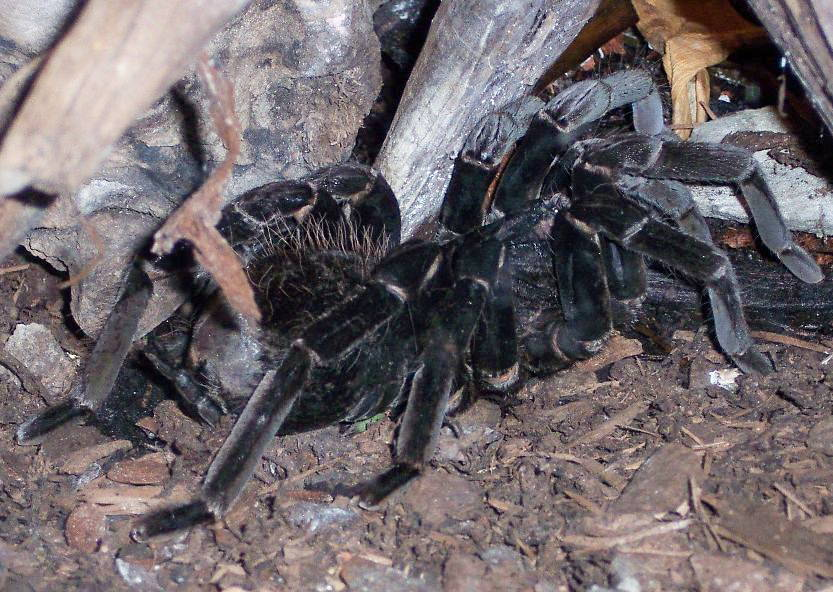

Scientific classification
- Kingdom: Animalia
- Phylum: Arthropoda
- Subphylum: Chelicerata
- Class: Arachnida
- Order: Araneae
- Infraorder: Mygalomorphae
- Family: Theraphosidae
- Genus: Xenesthis
- Species: X. immanis

Binomial name
- Xenesthis immanis (Ausserer, 1875)

Synonyms
- Lasiodora immanis Ausserer, 1875

= Xenesthis immanis =

Colombian lesser black tarantula

Species of spider

Xenesthis immanis, the Colombian lesser black tarantula, is a terrestrial bird spider (tarantula) found in Colombia, Venezuela, and Peru. It is a relatively large spider with a body length reaching 6–7 cm and a length width reaching 19–22 cm. It frequently displays a commensal or mutualistic relationship with the microhylid frog Chiasmocleis ventrimaculata. The relationship described is one where the spider may protect the frog and its eggs from predators while the frog protects the spider's eggs from ants. It has also been observed closely associating with Hamptophryne boliviana, another microhylid.
