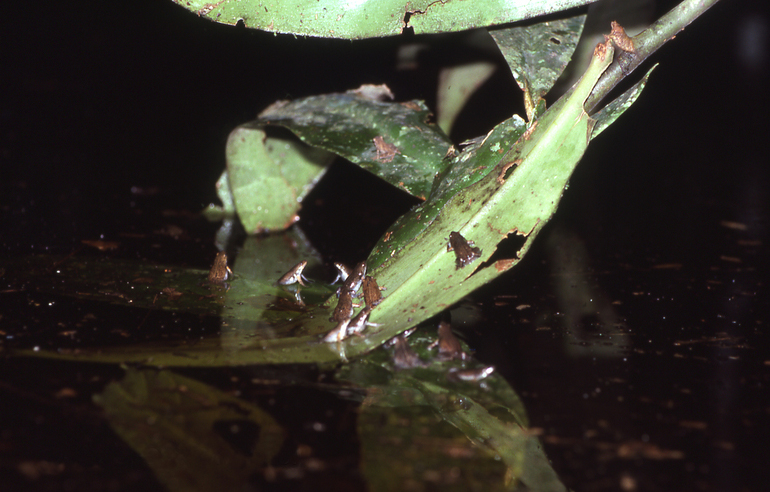
- A group of Chiasmocleis ventrimaculata

Conservation status
- Least Concern (IUCN 3.1)

Scientific classification
- Kingdom: Animalia
- Phylum: Chordata
- Class: Amphibia
- Order: Anura
- Family: Microhylidae
- Genus: Chiasmocleis
- Species: C. ventrimaculata

Binomial name
- Chiasmocleis ventrimaculata (Andersson, 1945)

Synonyms
- Engystoma ventrimaculata Andersson, 1945

= Chiasmocleis ventrimaculata =

Species of frog known for living in partnership with burrowing tarantulas

Chiasmocleis ventrimaculata, also known as the dotted humming frog, is a species of frog in the family Microhylidae. It is found in Bolivia, Brazil, Colombia, Ecuador, and Peru. Its natural habitats are subtropical or tropical moist lowland forests, swamps, and intermittent freshwater marshes. The dotted humming frog is notable for its association with burrowing tarantulas, which is thought to represent a mutualistic relationship.

== Description ==
Chiasmocleis ventrimaculata is a small frog of a snout–vent length of approximately 2 cm (0.79 in). C. ventrimaculata lacks webbing on the hind foot. It has a narrow and pointed head and a slender body. These frogs have cryptic camouflage which allows them to resemble the leaf litter they inhabit.

As tadpoles, they are typically around 17 mm in length and have a body length of 7 mm (0.28 in). Their bodies are flattened and are about twice as wide as they are deep. They are widest at the eyes. These are large and widely separated. The snout when viewed dorsally is broad and bluntly rounded and just rounded in the lateral view. The tadpole has no nostrils. These tadpoles have small terminal mouths, with large, fleshy upper lips which cover the oral cavity. They lack the horny mouthparts of some other tadpoles. These tadpoles are nearly uniform pale brown with additional pigmentation.

C. ventrimaculata is closely related to the following Chiasmocelis species: C. albopunctata, C. anatipes, C. antenori, C. avilapiresae, C. bassleri, C. carvalhoi, C. devriesi, C. haddadi, C. hudsoni, C. magnova, C. papachibe, C. royi, C. shudikarensis, C. supercilialba, and C. tridactyla.

== Distribution ==
C. ventrimaculata's geographic distribution is quite disjointed, mostly being found in the western Amazon region (Colombia, Ecuador, Peru, Bolivia, and western Brazil).

== Biology ==
C. ventrimaculata lives among leaf litter and other vegetation close to the ground. During mating seasons, they are known to reproduce at temporary ponds of rainwater. Unfortunately, little is currently known about their habits during the dry season.

These frogs prefer to remain underground during the day and emerge after dusk alongside their spider hosts and forage the surrounding areas. These frogs do not appear to be territorial. Often several frogs, ranging from 1 to 4, can be seen emerging from a tarantula's burrow. These frogs will cautiously exit the burrow at dusk to begin their foraging. The feeding habits of the frogs is that of a modified sit-and-wait forage mode; they will sit and wait for food to arrive, similar to ambush predators. These frogs were observed to stay within a range of 5 cm (2.0 in) from the entrance of the burrow and at the end of their foraging period rapidly dart back into the burrow. These frogs show high fidelity to the specific burrow which they originally selected and are never seen switching burrows. Even after the tarantulas leave the burrow because of the burrows becoming too inhospitable for the spiders to live in, Chiasmocleis ventrimaculata have been recorded to still live there.

The diet of Chiasmocleis ventrimaculata is mostly ant based (myrmecophagy). They are also known to feed on mites.

When threatened, these frogs will make a short leap and land with their legs stretched backwards in a stiff-legged posture. This behavior has been seen to last up to 4 minutes.

=== Ecology ===
As tadpoles, Chiasmocleis ventrimaculata are often preyed upon by freshwater crustacean species such as Dilocarcinus and Goyazana crabs, along with the naiads of odonates. Various predators are known to feed on both tadpoles and adults: turtles such as Phrynops gibbus and Podocnemis unifilis, various spiders, fish like Hoplias malabaricus and Synbranchus marmoratus, caimans, bats thought to be Trachops cirrhosus, a wide variety of birds including capped herons, sunbitterns and double-toothed kites, and especially various snake species feed on these frogs.

==== Symbiosis ====
This frog is notable for its symbiotic relationship with a burrowing tarantula originally thought to be Xenesthis immanis. However, further research suggests that X. immanis is not present in the region studied (a Peruvian locale), and the tarantula may actually be some species of Pamphobeteus. The relationship between the frogs and the tarantulas appears to be unique to this species, as these tarantulas attack similar frog species, implying that the dotted humming frog must have a special feature attractive to burrowing tarantulas. This mutualism between microhylids and large spiders also occurs in other parts of the world.

Whether or not the relationship is mutualistic or commensal still dominates conversations surrounding this species. It is clear the dotted humming frog greatly benefits from this relationship, as the tarantula provides the frog protection from predators, a stable food source due to the frog's ability to scavenge from remnants of the spider's prey, and shelter to protect from climate variation.

It has been hypothesized that the tarantulas might benefit from this relationship due to the fact these frogs are ant specialists, which can help them protect female spider's eggs from predation, increasing the fitness of female spiders who have these frogs in their burrows. Alternative suggestions include the skin of these frogs containing antimicrobial chemicals which help keep the spider eggs healthy and that because these frogs can attract predators, tarantulas with frogs in their burrows have access to more food because they can then eat these predators.

The tarantulas have been recorded attacking similar frog species to C. ventrimaculata, but have been never recorded attacking C. ventrimaculata by mistake. The movements of the frog do not stimulate the host tarantulas to attack and there is an unknown chemical present in the frog's skin that acts as a cue to the tarantulas that this species is not prey. The spiders did attempt to catch and eat five species of frogs from the families Bufonidae, Hylidae, and Leptodactylidae. It is noted that the frogs will remain more active in areas with some vegetation while the spiders used the open area.

=== Reproduction ===
These frogs are explosive breeders. During the rainy season, C. ventrimaculata are found in groups of hundreds of individuals. After the first substantial rainfall (above 60 mm), males will begin to appear in nearby ponds of water and start to call. These choruses will first begin on land within leaf litter, and later from floating leaves and twigs. The females will reach the ponds by nightfall and these choruses will go on for the next day and night. On the third morning, the frogs will leave the pond which has been filled with clutches of eggs. There is a preliminary calculated sex ratio of 12 males to 1 female. In general, reproductive activities were highest at the beginning of the rainy season and decrease rapidly after November.

Chiasmocleis ventrimaculata prefers breeding in temporary ponds in the forest. During the mating season, there is a change in the frog's behavior. Instead of being nocturnal, these frogs become active both during the day and at night. The males will begin to chorus, or sing, during this period of time as well. Males will make calls during the breeding season that consist of a series of short pulses (7–8 per second). The frequency range for these calls falls within 5.120–6.960 Hz. These males will move so that their vocal sacs are elevated so that females will be able to hear their calls.

Mating occurs during most of the day but particularly from 8:00 pm to 4:00 am. The females that are attracted to the males will move into the water towards the males, and the males will then jump into the water to perform amplexus. The males do not vocalize during amplexus, and this lasts up to 30 minutes.

==== Life history ====
Chiasmocleis ventrimaculata will lay their eggs on the surface of ponds. Because of the explosive nature of their mating season, thousands of eggs can be deposited in one season onto these ponds, with each female possessing a typical clutch size of around 400 eggs.

The eggs are deposited into large temporary ponds which form because of the rainy season. These eggs will hatch 36 hours after fertilization. Immediately after hatching, the frogs will remain motionless in a vertical position with their head up under the water. After 24 hours, they shift their position from a vertical to a diagonal of 45 degrees, still remaining motionless. After 48 hours, they begin to move; the tadpoles prefer the shoreline and tend to aggregate there as a way to defend against aquatic predators. These tadpoles can be observed at different depths in shallow water (about 60 cm (24 in) deep) and form big, nearly motionless aggregations, in which each individual is positioned in the same direction. The main diet of these tadpoles seems to be detritus from decomposing litter and insects.

Froglets leave the water after 3 weeks.

== Conservation ==
The Amazon is the center of intense degradation because of human occupancy, deforestation, and mining. As a result, large parts of the humming frog's habitat are at risk. Despite this, Chiasmocleis ventrimaculata and Chiasmocleis species in general are not listed as threatened by the IUCN, mostly being listed as least concern.
