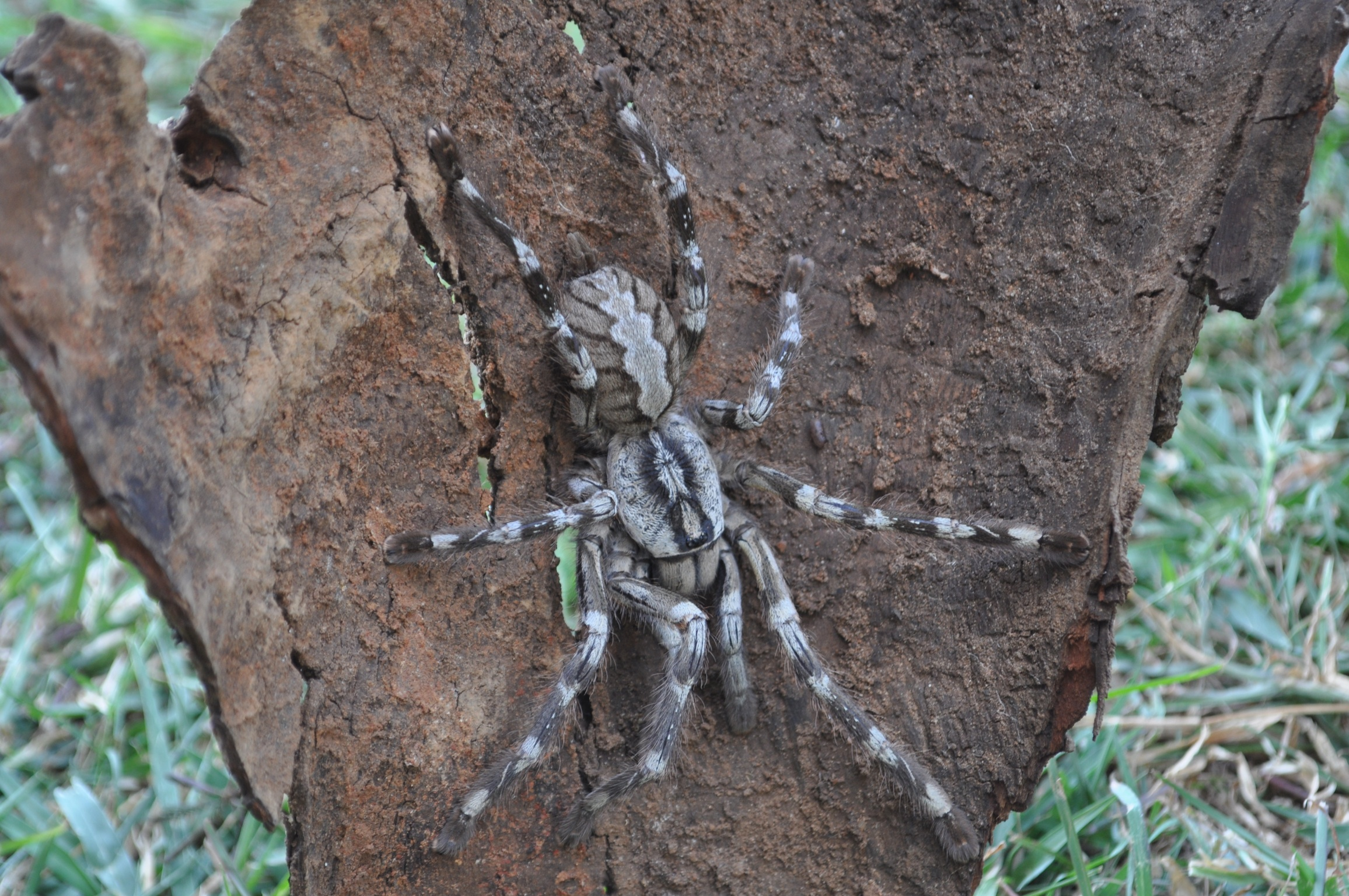
- Poecilotheria rajaei

Conservation status
- CITES Appendix II

Scientific classification
- Kingdom: Animalia
- Phylum: Arthropoda
- Subphylum: Chelicerata
- Class: Arachnida
- Order: Araneae
- Infraorder: Mygalomorphae
- Family: Theraphosidae
- Genus: Poecilotheria
- Species: P. rajaei

Binomial name
- Poecilotheria rajaei Nanayakkara et al., 2012

Synonyms
- Poecilotheria amarasekarai

= Poecilotheria rajaei =

Species of spider

Poecilotheria rajaei is a tarantula in the genus Poecilotheria endemic to Sri Lanka.

== Genus ==
The genus is native to Sri Lanka and India. The name Poecilotheria is derived from Greek: "poikilos", meaning spotted, and "therion", meaning wild beast.

== Discovery ==
P. rajaei was officially described in a 2012 publication of the British Tarantula Society. It was discovered in 2009 when a villager brought a dead specimen to Ranil Nanayakkara, the co-founder of the Sri Lankan Biodiversity Education and Research organization, who was conducting an arachnid survey of Sri Lanka at the time.

== Description ==
The spider has a leg span of up to 20 centimetres (8 in), has vivid yellow and gray piping on the first and fourth legs with a pink abdominal band. It prefers to live in old-growth trees, but is considered rare due to deforestation in its war-torn habitat and has taken to living in old buildings. The venom of P. rajaei is not lethal to humans but can kill small rodents, birds, lizards and snakes. It is not yet known exactly how rare the newly discovered tarantula is, but there is some concern that habitat destruction is causing their number to dwindle.

The species was named for Michael Rajakumar Purajah, the local police inspector who guided the research team while they searched for living specimens.
