= Critically endangered species =

IUCN conservation category

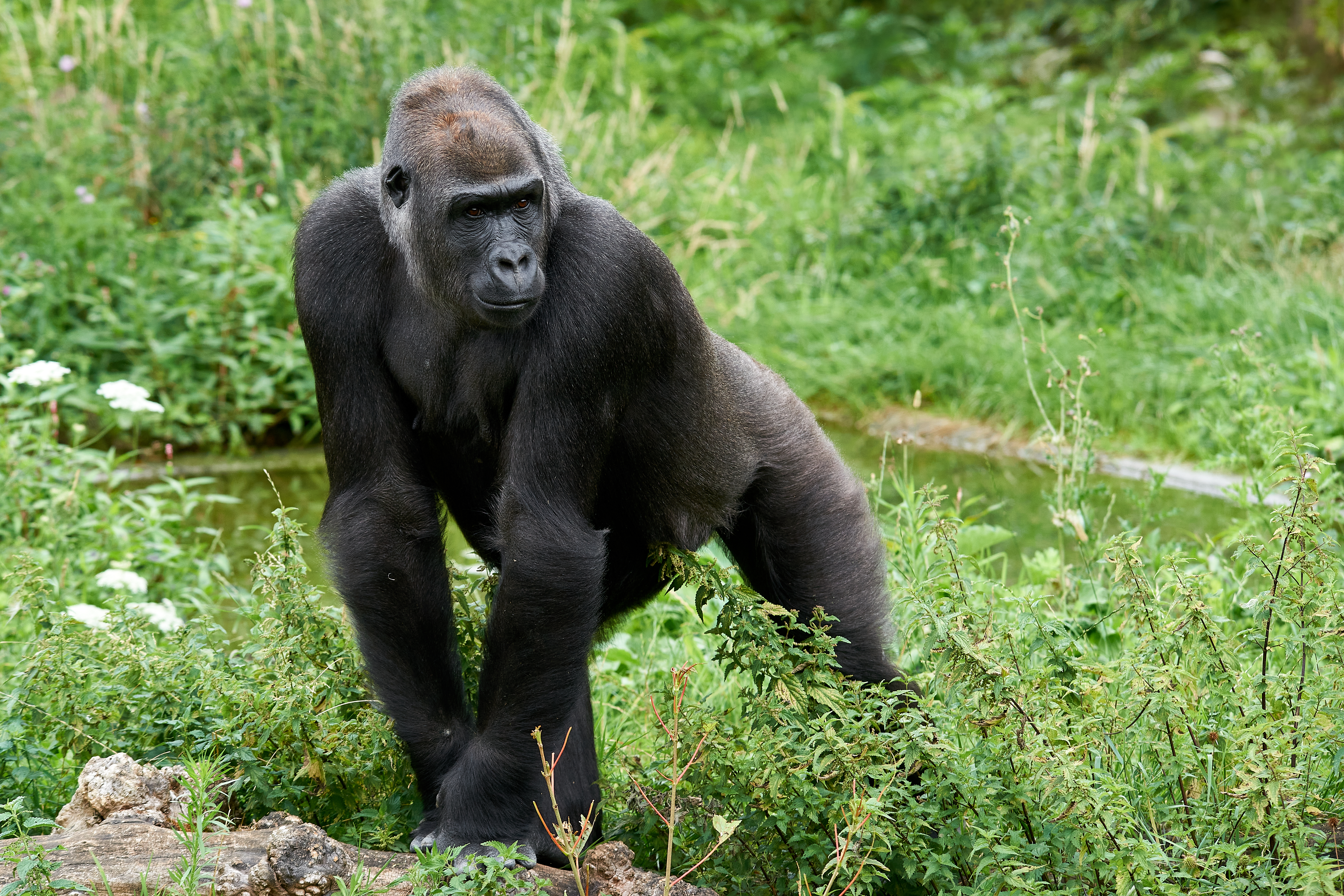
Western gorilla, a species of Gorilla with a conservation status of critically endangered, due to habitat loss and hunting for bushmeat.

An IUCN Red List critically endangered (CR or sometimes CE) species is one that has been categorized by the International Union for Conservation of Nature as facing an extremely high risk of extinction in the wild. As of March 2026, of the 172,620 species currently on the IUCN Red List, 10,774 (or 6.2%) of those are listed as critically endangered, with 1,406 being possibly extinct and 64 possibly extinct in the wild. More than half of all species listed as critically endangered are plants, with a total of 6,445 plant species (or 59.8%) listed as such. There are 4,277 animal species, 48 fungi species and 4 chromista species listed as critically endangered.

The IUCN Red List provides the public with information regarding the conservation status of animal, fungi, and plant species. It divides various species into seven different categories of conservation that are based on habitat range, population size, habitat, threats, etc. Each category represents a different level of global extinction risk. Species that are considered to be critically endangered are placed within the "Threatened" category.

== Possibly extinct ==
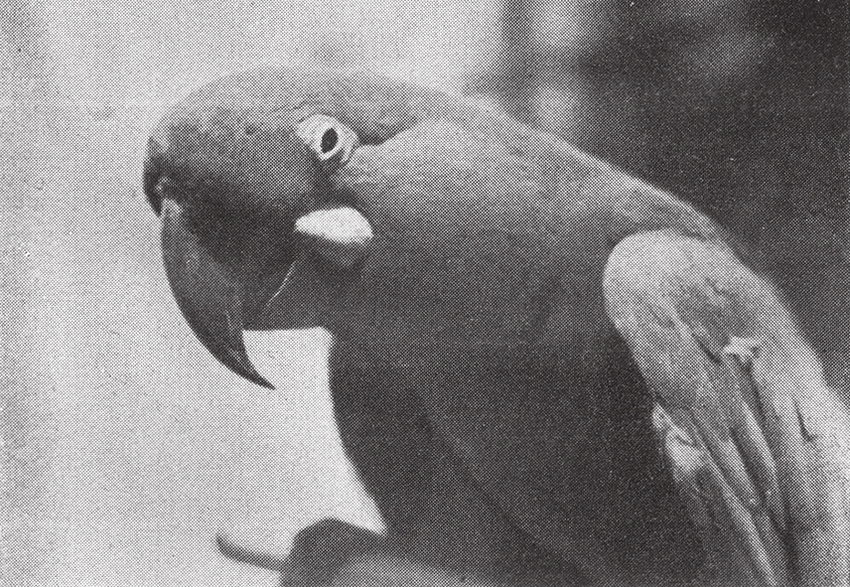
The Glaucous Macaw is currently classified as Critically Endangered and possibly Extinct. This is caused by destruction of nesting sites and Yatay palms, alongside hunting, both for meat and for the pet trade

As the IUCN Red List does not consider a species extinct until extensive targeted surveys have been conducted, species that are possibly extinct are still listed as critically endangered. IUCN maintains lists of critically endangered species that are "possibly extinct" and "possibly extinct in the wild", modelled on categories used by BirdLife International, the Red List Authority for birds for the IUCN Red List. "Possibly extinct" and "Possibly extinct in the wild" are considered tags for critically endangered species, and are not their own Red List categories.

== Criteria ==
To be defined as critically endangered in the Red List, a species must meet any of the following criteria (A–E):

A) Reduction in population size based on any of the following:

1. An observed, estimated, inferred or suspected population size reduction of ≥ 90% over the last 10 years or three generations, whichever is the longer, where the causes of the reduction are reversible AND understood AND ceased, based on (and specifying) any of the following:

- a. direct observation
- b. an index of abundance appropriate for the taxon
- c. a decline in area of occupancy, extent of occurrence or quality of habitat
- d. actual or potential levels of exploitation
- e. the effects of introduced taxa, hybridisation, pathogens, pollutants, competitors or parasites.

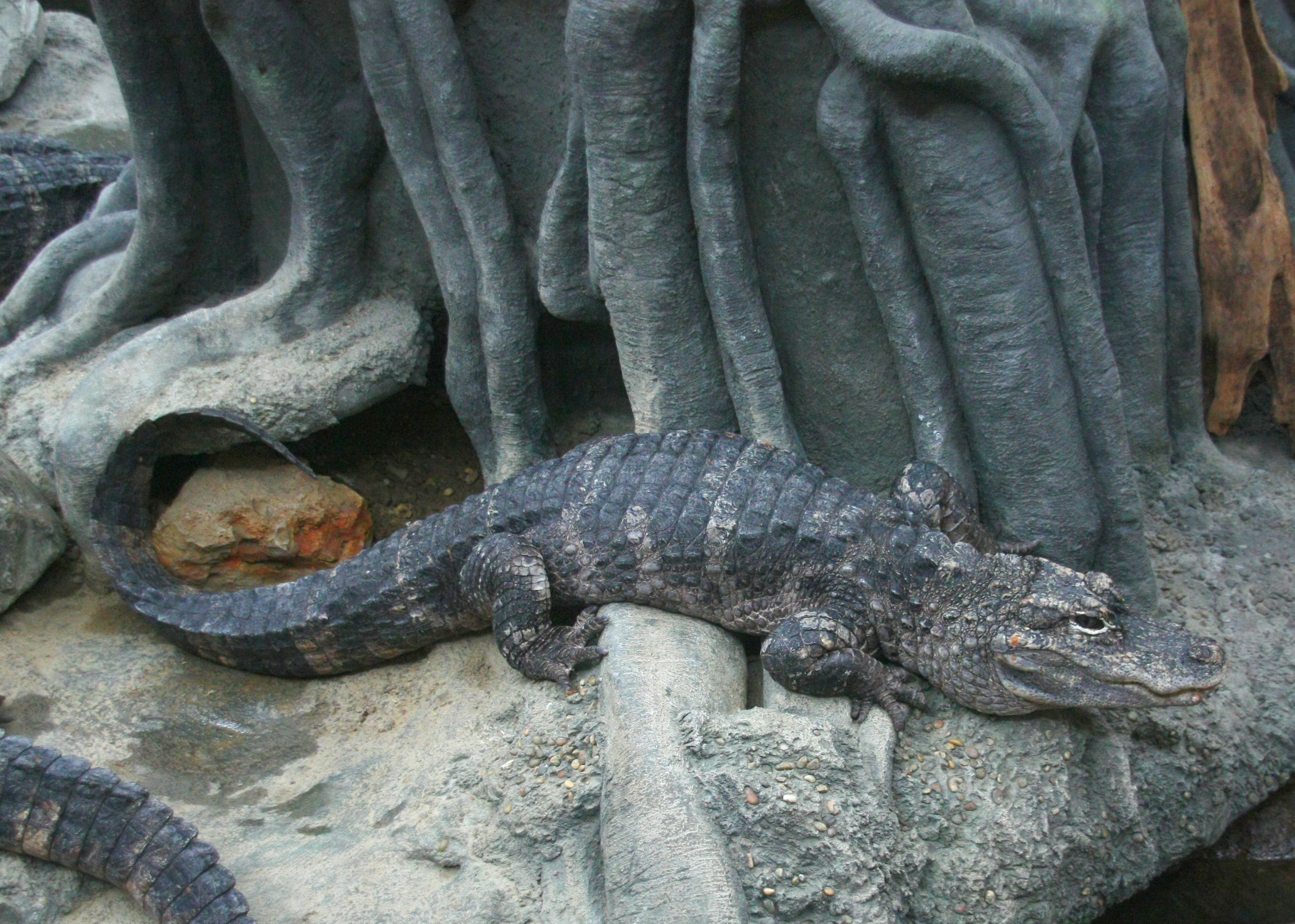
The Chinese Alligator, one of two species of Alligator, has a conservation status of critically endangered, due to habitat destruction and hunting for its meat.

2. An observed, estimated, inferred or suspected population size reduction of ≥ 80% occurred over the last 10 years or three generations, whichever is the longer, where the reduction or its causes may not have ceased OR may not be understood OR may not be reversible, based on (and specifying) any of (a) to (e) under A1.

B) Geographic range in the form of either B1 (extent of occurrence) OR B2 (area of occupancy) OR both:

1. Extent of occurrence estimated to be less than 100 km^{2}, and estimates indicating at least two of a-c:

- a. Severely fragmented or known to exist at only one location.
- b. Continuing decline, inferred, observed or projected, in any of the following:
  - i. extent of occurrence
  - ii. area of occupancy
  - iii. area, extent or quality of habitat
  - iv. number of locations or subpopulations
  - v. number of mature individuals
- c. Extreme fluctuations in any of the following:
  - i. extent of occurrence
  - ii. area of occupancy
  - iii. number of locations or subpopulations
  - iv. number of mature individuals

2. Area of occupancy estimated to be less than 10 km^{2}, and estimates indicating at least two of a-c:

- a. Severely fragmented or known to exist at only one location.
- b. Continuing decline, inferred, observed or projected, in any of the following:
  - i. extent of occurrence
  - ii. area of occupancy
  - iii. area, extent or quality of habitat
  - iv. number of locations or subpopulations
  - v. number of mature individuals
- c. Extreme fluctuations in any of the following:
  - i. extent of occurrence
  - ii. area of occupancy
  - iii. number of locations or subpopulations
  - iv. number of mature individuals

C) Population estimated to number fewer than 250 mature individuals and either:

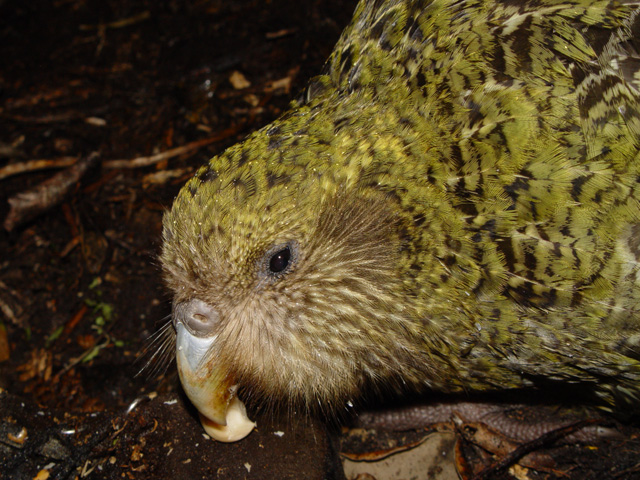
The kākāpō of New Zealand's South Island has a conservation status of critically endangered, due to predation by invasive species.

1. An estimated continuing decline of at least 25% within ten years or three generations, whichever is longer, OR

2. A continuing decline, observed, projected, or inferred, in numbers of mature individuals AND at least one of the following (a-b):

- a. Population structure in the form of one of the following:
  - i. no subpopulation estimated to contain more than 50 mature individuals, OR
  - ii. at least 90% of mature individuals in one subpopulation
- b. Extreme fluctuations in the number of older individuals

D) Population size estimated to number fewer than 50 mature individuals.

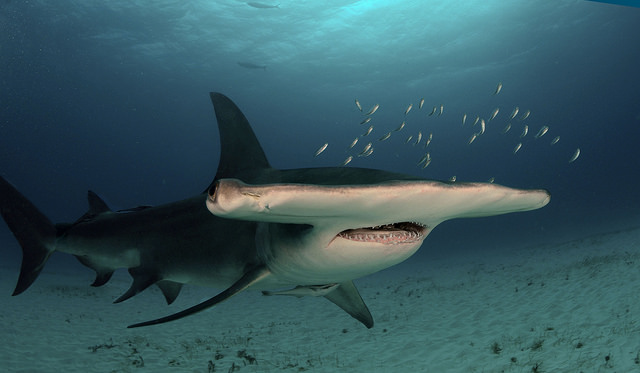
The great hammerhead shark has a conservation status of critically endangered, due to overfishing for its fins.

E) Quantitative analysis showing the probability of extinction in the wild is at least 50% within 10 years or three generations, whichever is the longer.

== Causes ==
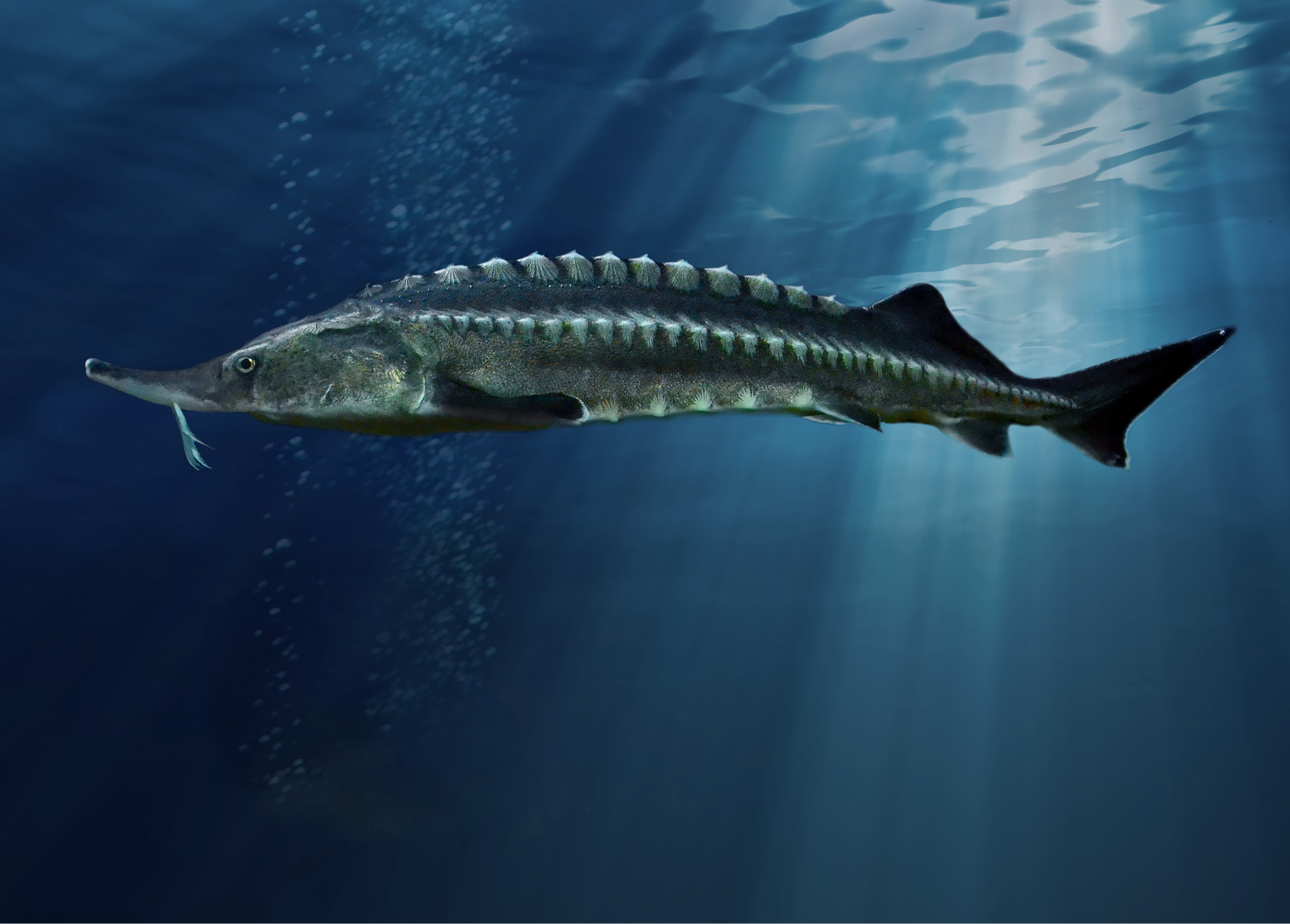
The Beluga sturgeon (Huso huso) is an example of a critically endangered species. Their wild populations have been reduced significantly due to overharvesting for its caviar.

The current extinction crisis is witnessing extinction rates that are occurring at a faster rate than that of the natural extinction rate. It has largely been credited towards human impacts on climate change and the loss of biodiversity. This is along with natural forces that may create stress on the species or cause an animal population to become extinct.

Currently, the biggest reason for species extinction is human interaction resulting in habitat loss. Species rely on their habitat for the resources needed for their survival. If the habitat gets destroyed, the population will see a decline in their numbers. Activities that cause loss of habitat include: pollution, urbanization, and agriculture. Another reason that plants and animals become endangered is due to the introduction of invasive species. Invasive species invade and exploit a new habitat for its natural resources as a method to outcompete the native organisms, eventually taking over the habitat. This can lead to either the native species' extinction or causing them to become endangered, which also eventually causes extinction. Plants and animals may also go extinct due to disease. The introduction of a disease into a new habitat can cause it to spread amongst the native species. Due to their lack of familiarity with the disease or little or even no resistance, the native species can die off.

== Examples ==
There are thousands of species categorized as critically endangered, including over 4,000 animals. Some of the most notable and known examples of critically endangered animals include mammals like the Vaquita, Amur leopard, Saola, Sumatran orangutan and several species of pangolin; birds like the Kākāpō and California condor; fish like the Devils Hole pupfish; reptiles like the Hawksbill sea turtle and Yangtze giant softshell turtle; amphibians like the Axolotl, Chinese giant salamander and Panamanian golden frog; and arachnids like the peacock tarantula. The Wollemi pine is considered one of the most notable examples of critically endangered plants in the world.
