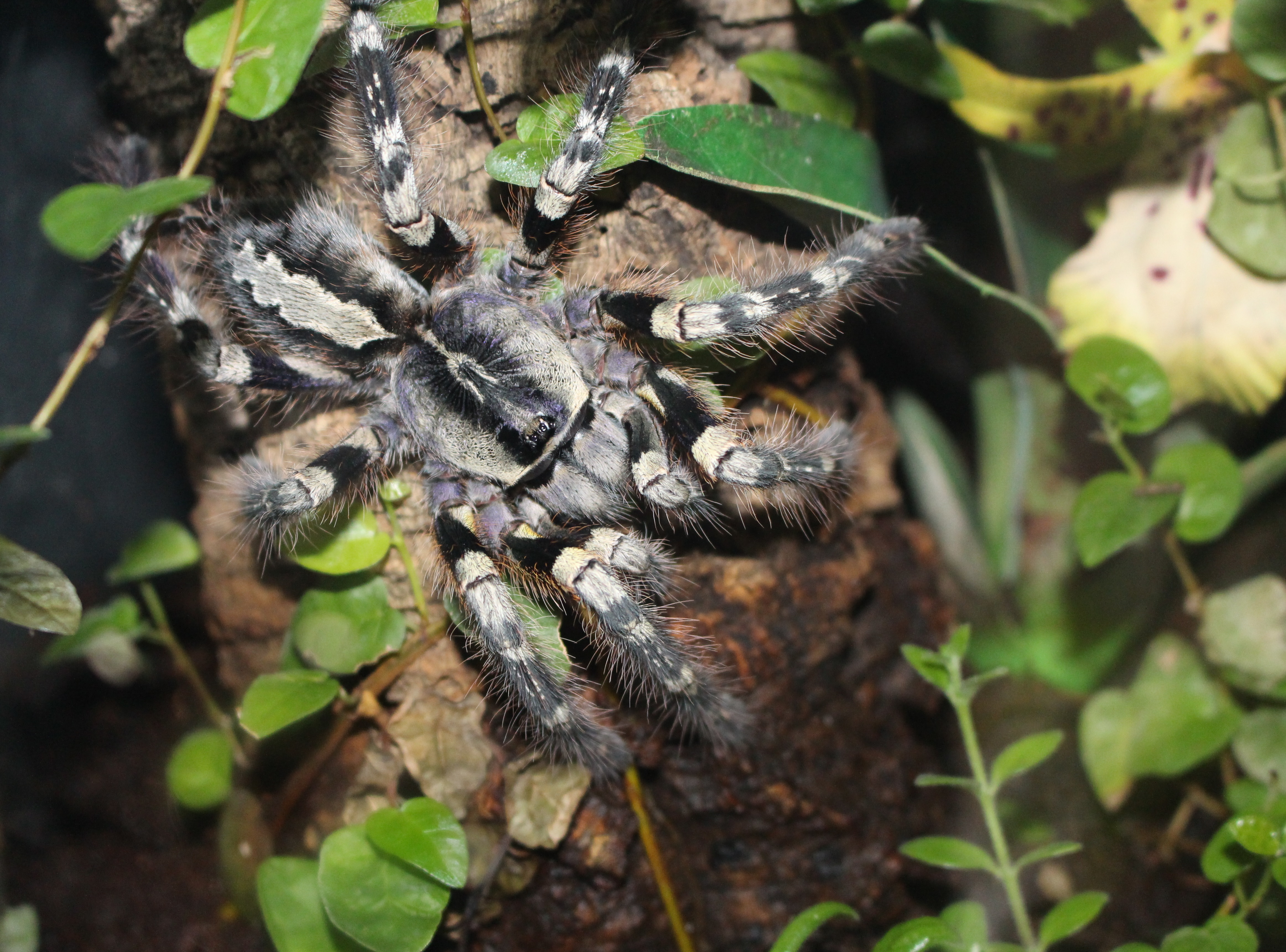

Conservation status
- Vulnerable (IUCN 3.1)
- CITES Appendix II

Scientific classification
- Kingdom: Animalia
- Phylum: Arthropoda
- Subphylum: Chelicerata
- Class: Arachnida
- Order: Araneae
- Infraorder: Mygalomorphae
- Family: Theraphosidae
- Genus: Poecilotheria
- Species: P. striata

Binomial name
- Poecilotheria striata Pocock, 1895

= Poecilotheria striata =

Species of spider

Poecilotheria striata, or the Mysore ornamental tarantula, is a large arboreal tarantula of the family Theraphosidae. It is endemic to India.

== Ecology ==
The species is found in dry and moist deciduous forests, at altitudes between 500 and 1000 m. It appears to be present in fewer than 10 severely fragmented locations.

== Conservation status ==
P. striata is classified as vulnerable due to its restricted and declining range and occupancy, and the ongoing fragmentation of its habitat. The species is commonly traded in the pet trade. A distribution survey published in 2015 found further population losses and suggested that the species be reclassified as Critical.
