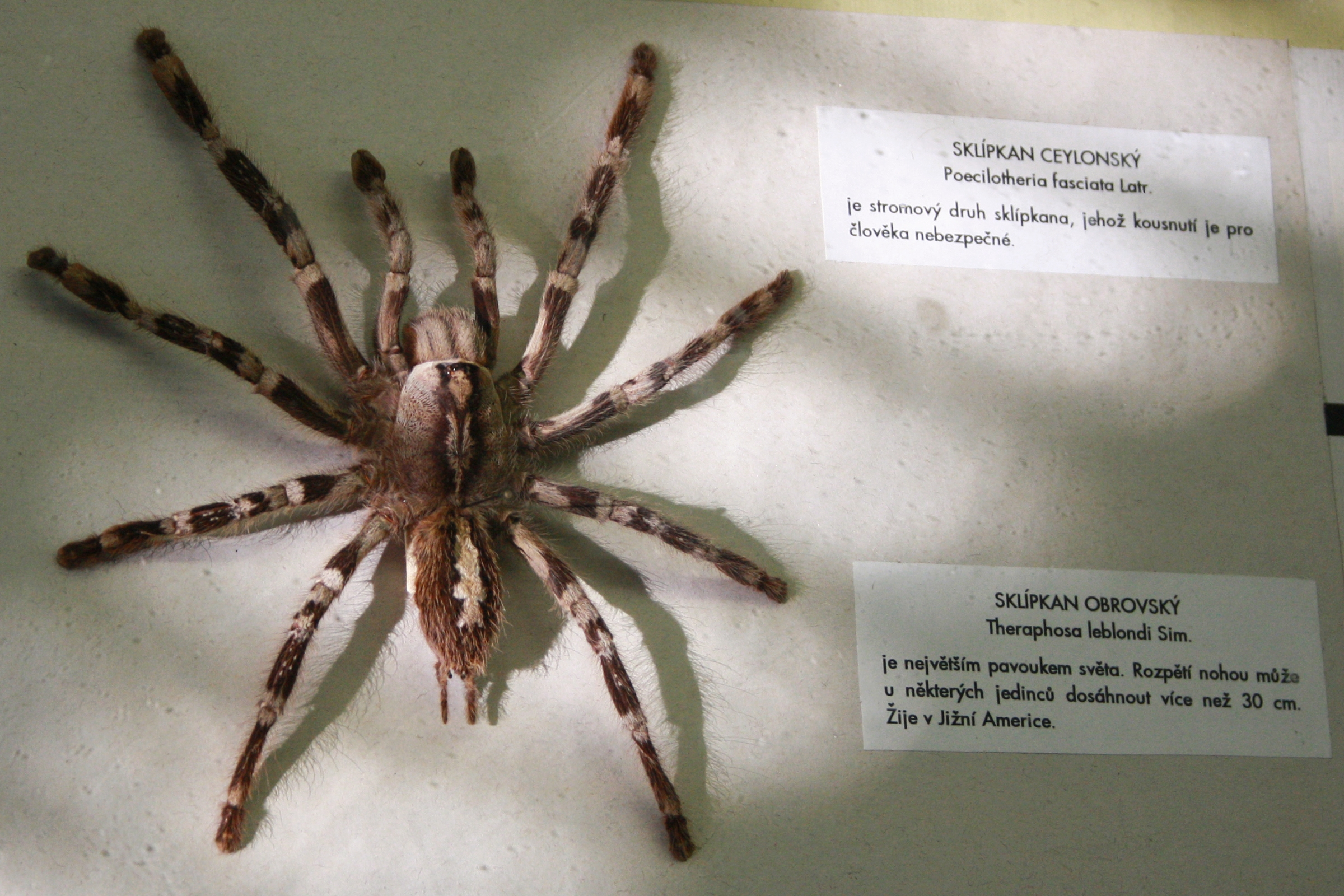
- Specimen in the Národní museum

Conservation status
- CITES Appendix II

Scientific classification
- Kingdom: Animalia
- Phylum: Arthropoda
- Subphylum: Chelicerata
- Class: Arachnida
- Order: Araneae
- Infraorder: Mygalomorphae
- Family: Theraphosidae
- Genus: Poecilotheria
- Species: P. fasciata

Binomial name
- Poecilotheria fasciata (Latreille, 1804)

Synonyms
- Mygale fasciata Latreille, 1804; Scurria fasciata (Latreille, 1804)

= Poecilotheria fasciata =

Sri Lanka ornamental tarantula

Species of spider

Poecilotheria fasciata, the Sri Lanka ornamental or Sri Lanka ornamental tiger spider, is a large arboreal tarantula. It is endemic to central Sri Lanka.

== Size ==
Females have a body length of 45 to 50 mm, whereas males are smaller, usually 32–35 mm.

== Identification ==
Poecilotheria fasciata can be identified from other tiger spiders due to very narrow dark band on the femur of first pair of legs and by thin broken band on femur of fourth pair of legs.

=== Female ===
Dorsally black, white and grey cryptic markings all over the legs and body. Carapace has two black lines. Opisthosoma has a light grey foliate median band runs the entire length of opisthosoma. Inside large foliate markings, there is a slightly darker median band.

Ventrally body is black. First and second leg pairs possess identical markings, which have yellow color bands. Third leg pair has bluish grey femur with a proximal black patch. Patella is blue grey with a thin black band distally. Fourth leg pair has bluish grey femur with a thin black band.

=== Male ===
Dorsally uniform brown colored with less intense markings. Opisthosoma has a dark median black line divided by distinct diamond-shaped chevrons.

All four pairs of legs are identically marked as female but with slight variations.

== Ecology ==
Found in dry zone and intermediate zones of Sri Lanka. Mostly abundant in tree hollows, tree barks, coconut trees, banana plantations and sometimes in human dwellings. Male is nomadic, whereas female is not. When disturbed, they are very defensive and nimble.

== Conservation ==
P. fasciata was listed as an endangered species for protection under the U.S. Endangered Species Act in 2018. The major factor cited in support of the designation was habitat loss within this species' small area of occupancy (less than 500 square kilometres or 190 square miles), worsened by collection for the pet trade, use of pesticides, killing out of fear, climate change and random effects.
