= Deimatic behaviour =

Bluffing display of an animal used to startle or scare a predator

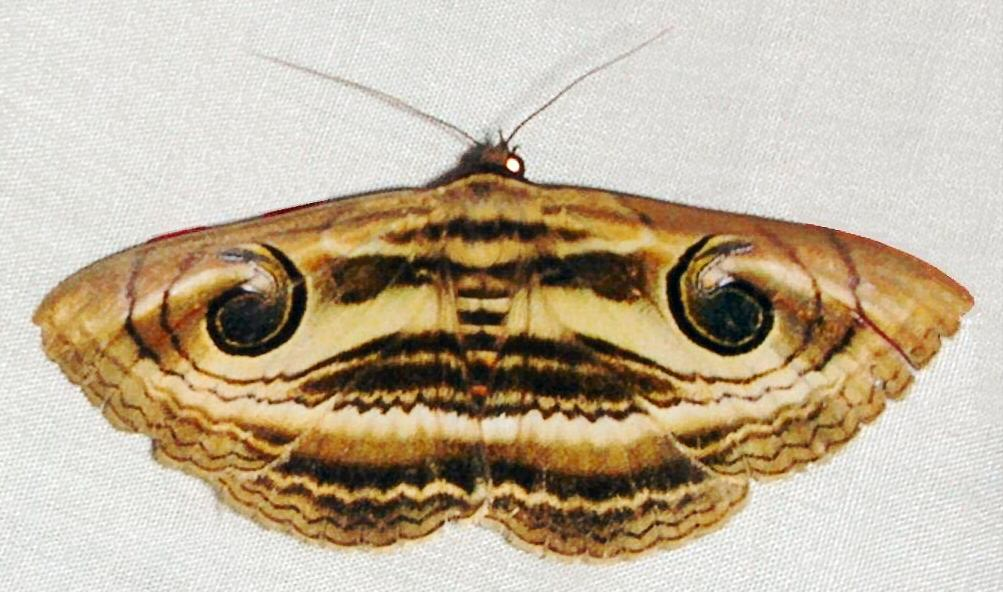
Spirama helicina resembling the face of a snake in a deimatic or bluffing display

Deimatic behaviour, also known as threat display or startle display, means any pattern of bluffing behaviour in an animal that lacks strong defences, such as suddenly displaying conspicuous eyespots to scare off or momentarily distract a predator, thus giving the prey animal an opportunity to escape. The term deimatic or dymantic originates from the Greek δειματόω (deimatóō), meaning "I frighten".

Deimatic display occurs in widely separated groups of animals, including moths, butterflies, mantises and phasmids among the insects. In the cephalopods, different species of octopuses, squids, cuttlefish and the paper nautilus are deimatic.

Displays are classified as deimatic or aposematic by the responses of the animals that see them. Where predators are initially startled but learn to eat the displaying prey, the display is classed as deimatic, and the prey is bluffing; where they continue to avoid the prey after tasting it, the display is taken as aposematic, meaning the prey is genuinely distasteful. However, these categories are not necessarily mutually exclusive. It is possible for a behaviour to be both deimatic and aposematic, if it both startles a predator and indicates the presence of anti-predator adaptations.

Vertebrates including several species of frog put on warning displays; some of these species have poison glands. Among mammals, such displays are often found in species with strong defences, such as in foul-smelling skunks and spiny porcupines. Thus these displays in both frogs and mammals are at least in part aposematic.

== In insects ==
Threat displays are not always deimatic bluff. Some stick insects spray the monoterpene chemical dolichodial when attacked, so their displays are honest aposematism.

Deimatic displays are made by insects including the praying mantises (Mantodea) and stick insects (Phasmatodea). While undisturbed, these insects are usually well camouflaged. When disturbed by a potential predator, they suddenly reveal their hind wings, which are brightly coloured. In mantises, the wing display is sometimes reinforced by showing brightly coloured front legs, and accompanied by a loud hissing sound created by stridulation. For example, the grasshopper Phymateus displays red and yellow areas on its hind wings; it is also aposematic, producing a distasteful secretion from its thorax. Similarly the threat display of the walking stick phasmid (Peruphasma schultei) is not a bluff: the insect sprays defensive dolichodial-like monoterpene chemical compounds at attackers.

Among moths with deimatic behaviour, the eyed hawkmoth (Smerinthus ocellatus) displays its large eyespots, moving them slowly as if it were a vertebrate predator such as an owl. Among butterflies, the peacock butterfly Aglais io is a cryptic leaf mimic with wings closed, but displays four conspicuous eyespots when disturbed, in a display effective against insectivorous birds (flycatchers).

An experiment by the Australian zoologist A. D. Blest demonstrated that the more an eyespot resembled a real vertebrate eye in both colour and pattern, the more effective it was in scaring off insectivorous birds. In another experiment using peacock butterflies, Blest showed that when the conspicuous eyespots had been rubbed off, insectivorous birds (yellow buntings) were much less effectively frightened off, and therefore both the sudden appearance of colour, and the actual eyespot pattern, contribute to the effectiveness of the deimatic display.

Some noctuid moths, such as the large red underwing (Catocala nupta), are cryptic at rest, but display a flash of startlingly bright colours when disturbed. Others, such as many species of genus Speiredonia and Spirama, look threatening while at rest. Also saturniid moths of the genera Attacus and Rothschildia display snake heads, but not from the frontal position.

Many arctiid moths make clicks when hunted by echolocating bats; they also often contain unpalatable chemicals. Some such as dogbane tiger moths (Cycnia tenera) have ears and conspicuous coloration, and start to make clicks when echolocating bats approach. An experiment by the Canadian zoologists John M. Ratcliffe and James H. Fullard, using dogbane tiger moths and northern long-eared bats (Myotis septentrionalis), suggests that the signals in fact both disrupt echolocation and warn of chemical defence. The behaviour of these insects is thus both deimatic and aposematic.

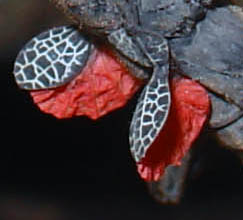
Deimatic display of the phasmid Peruphasma schultei

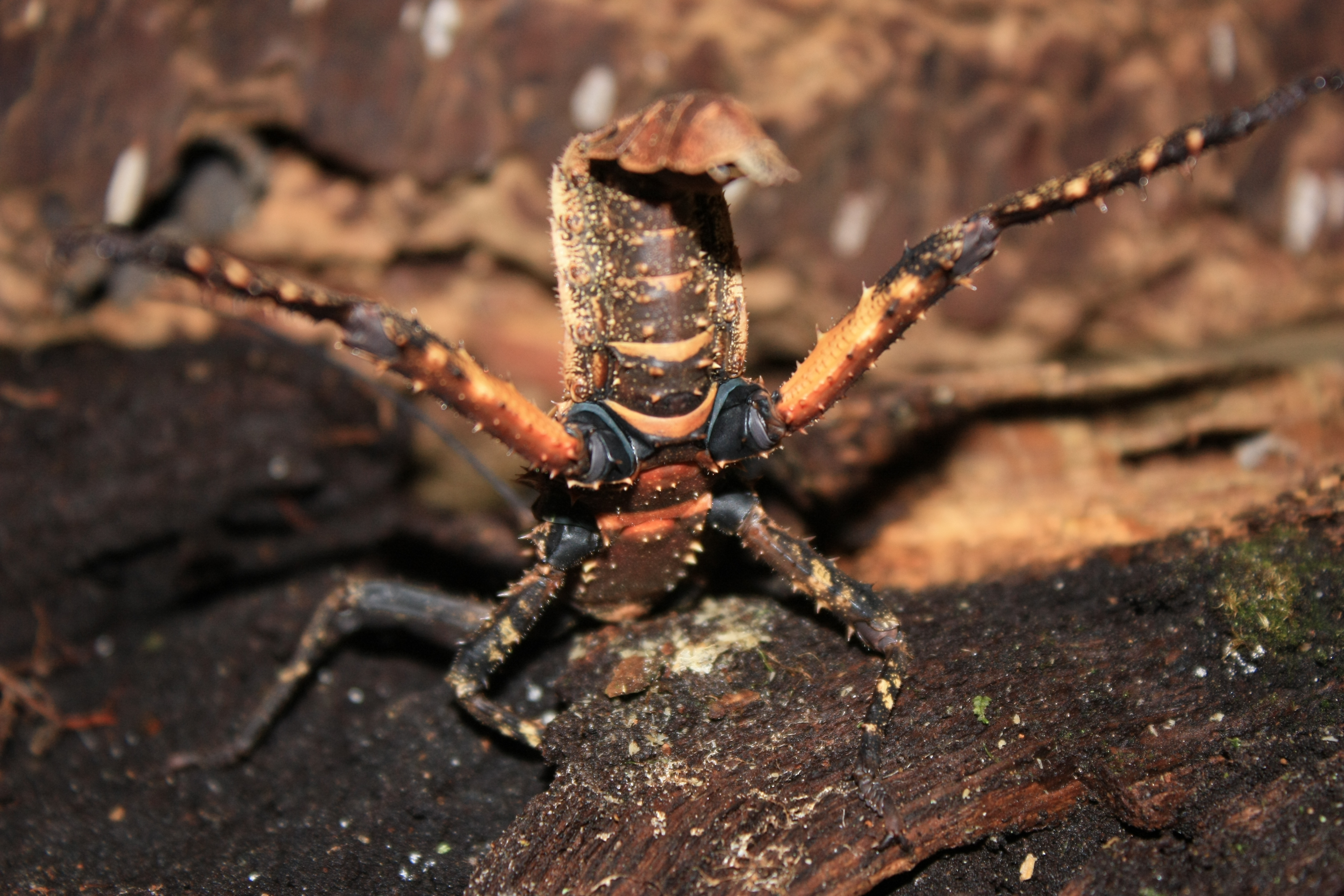
Threat pose of the phasmid Haaniella dehaanii

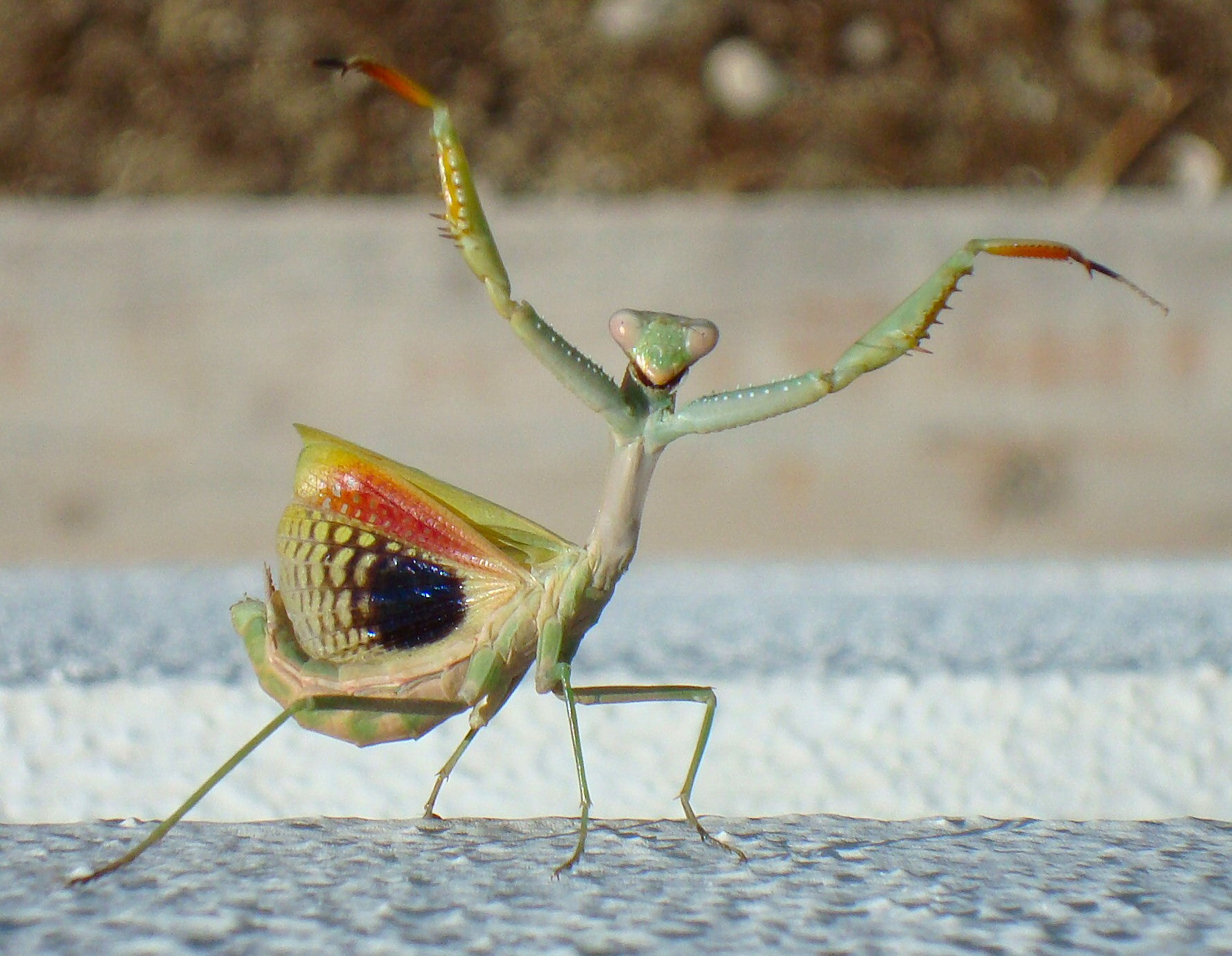
An adult female Mediterranean mantis, Iris oratoria, in threat pose

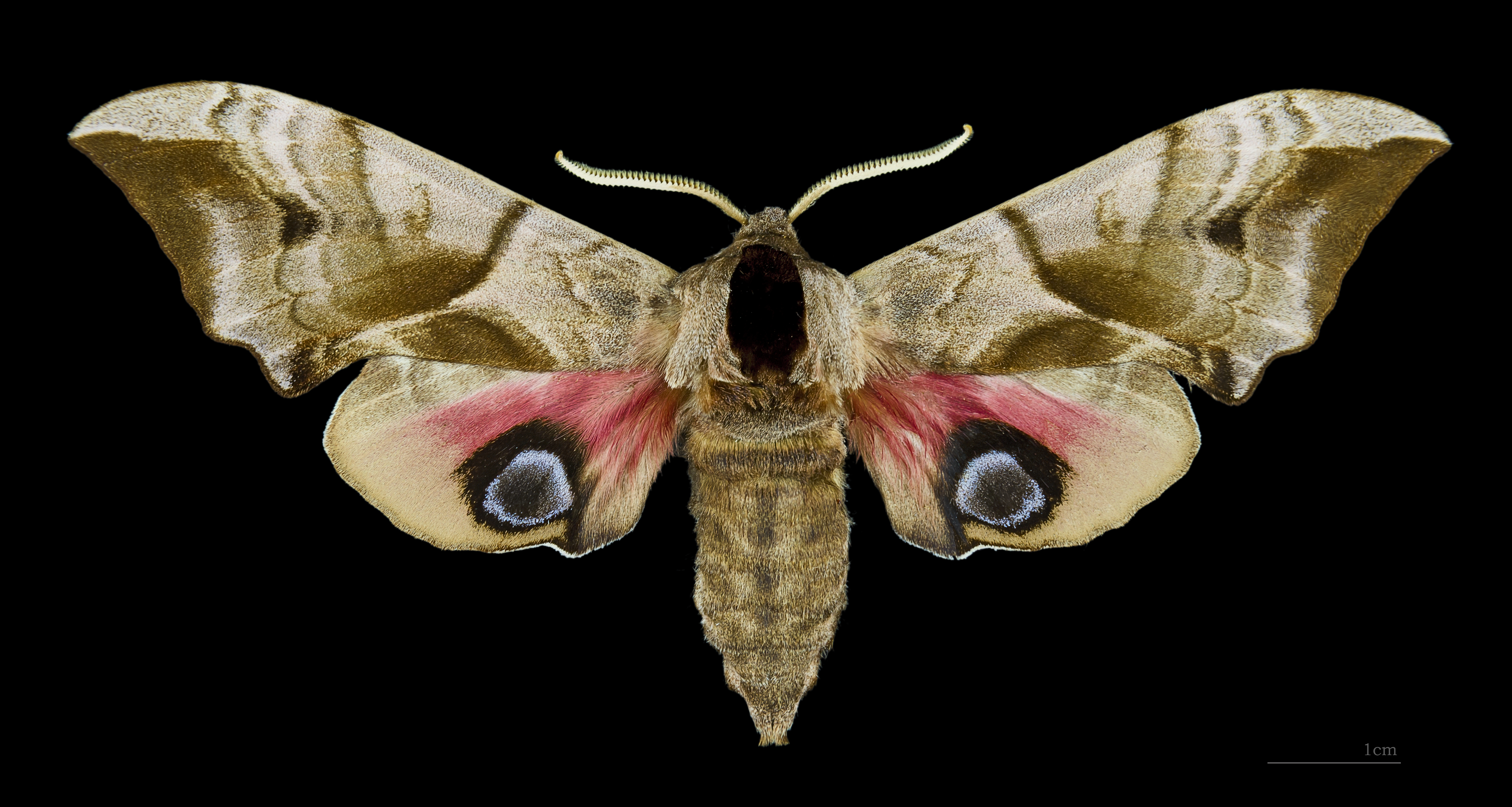
Female eyed hawkmoth, Smerinthus ocellatus, mounted to show the large eyespots

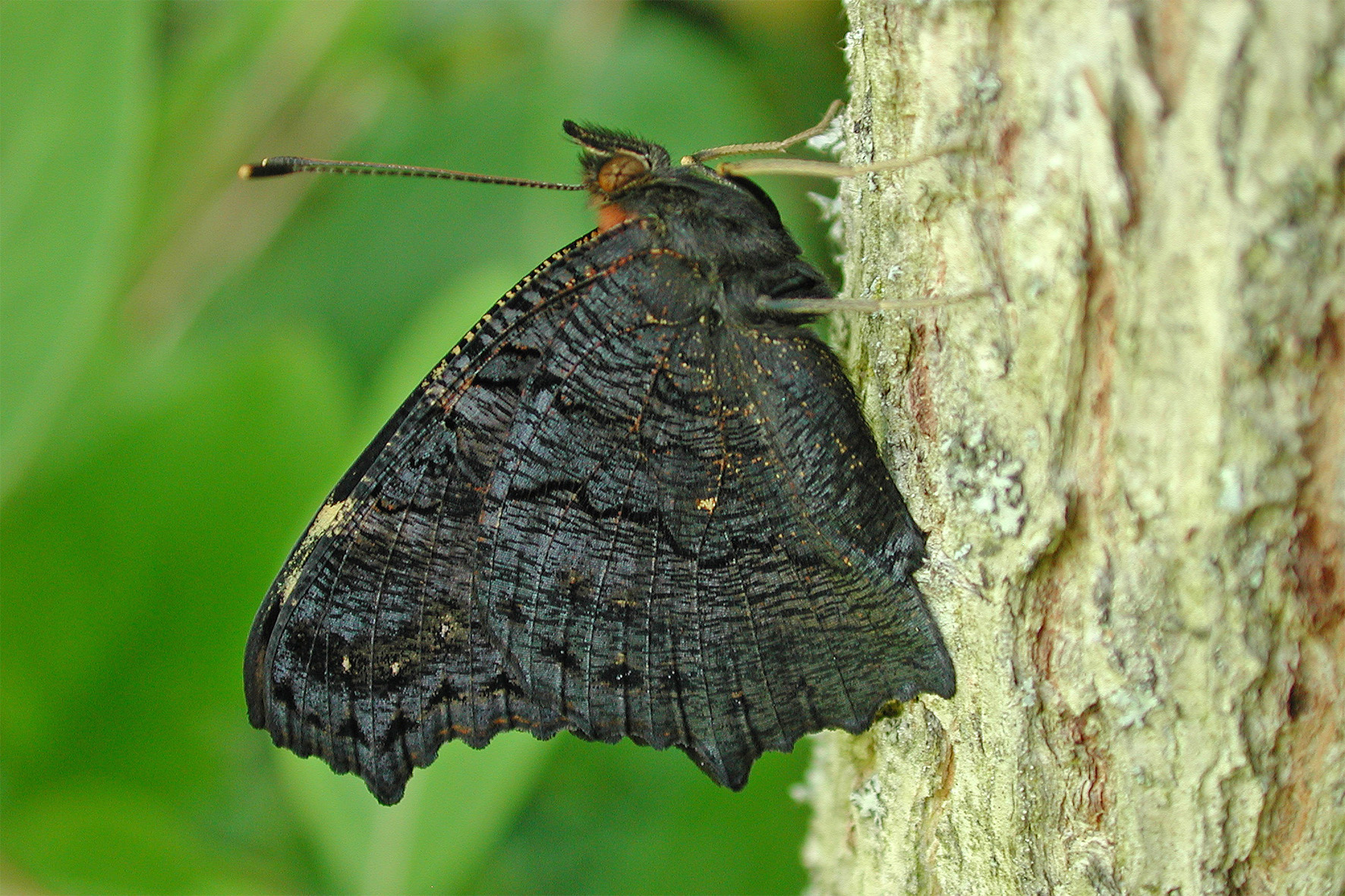
Peacock butterfly, Aglais io, is a cryptic leaf mimic when its wings are closed.

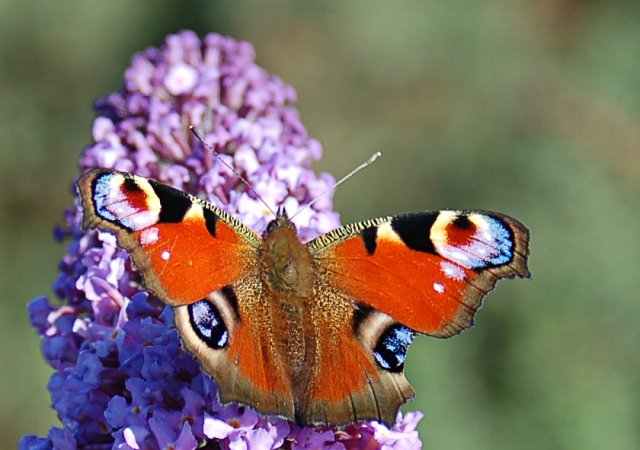
With its wings open, the peacock butterfly displays startling eyespots.

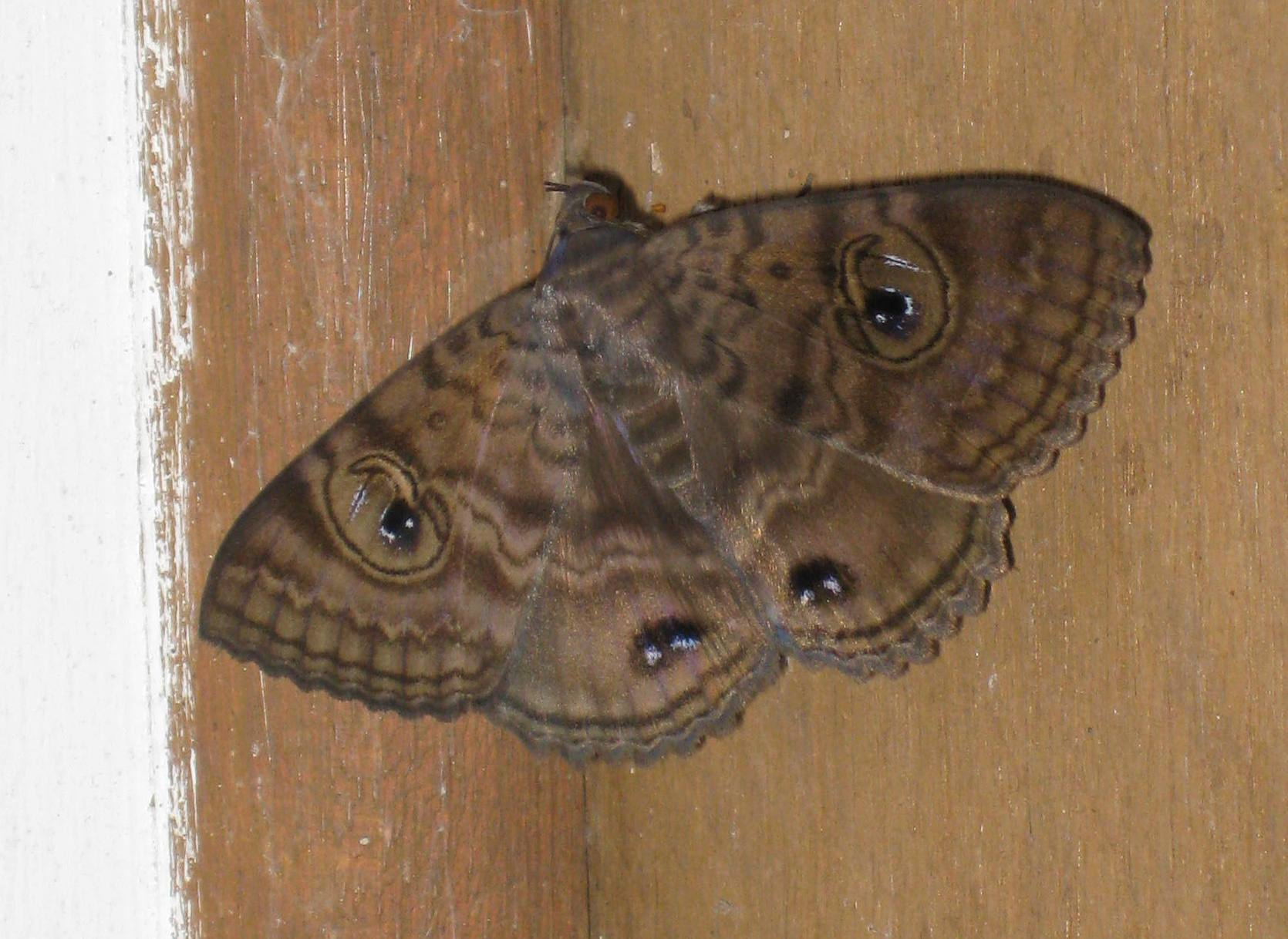
Speiredonia spectans resting mimicking a brooding head

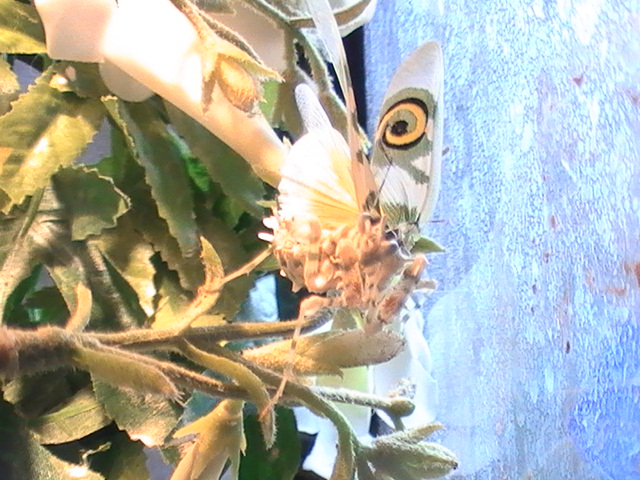
Pseudocreobotra wahlbergii flashing its wings in deimatic pose

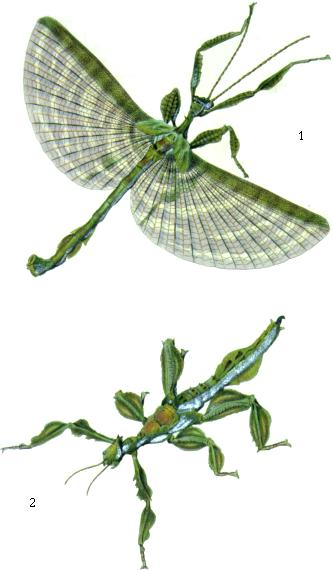
A fine large "Phasma" illustrated by George Robert Gray in 1833, showing cryptic resting pose and dramatic wing flash

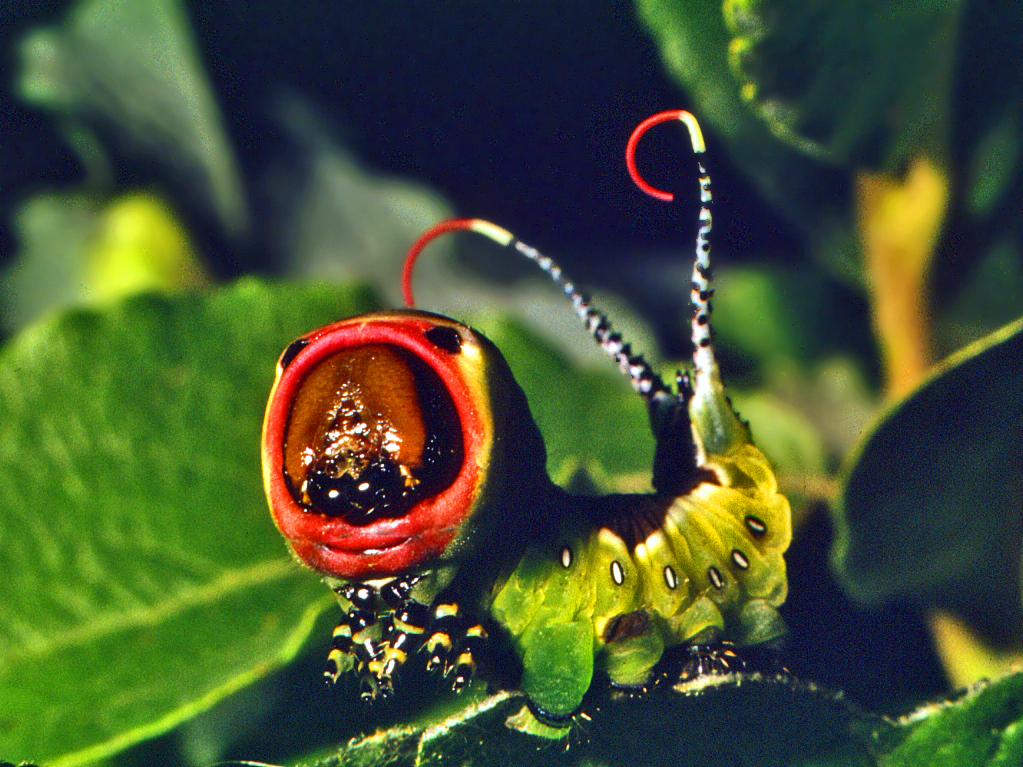
A puss moth (Cerura vinula) caterpillar displaying its two flagella on its tail and red patches on its head. If the threat does not retreat, the caterpillar can spray formic acid from its flagella.

== In arachnids ==
Both spiders and scorpions are venomous, so their threat displays can be considered generally aposematic. However, some predators such as hedgehogs and spider-hunting wasps (Pompilidae) actively hunt arachnids, overcoming their defences, so when a hedgehog is startled by, for instance, the sounds made by a scorpion, there is reason to describe the display as deimatic.

Spiders make use of a variety of different threat displays. Some such as Argiope and Pholcus make themselves and their webs vibrate rapidly when they are disturbed; this blurs their outline and perhaps makes them look larger, as well as more difficult to locate precisely for an attack. Mygalomorphae spiders such as tarantulas exhibit deimatic behaviour; when threatened, the spider rears back with its front legs and pedipalps spread and fangs bared. Some species, such as the dangerous Indian ornamental tree spider (Poecilotheria regalis) have bright colouring on the front legs and mouthparts which are shown off in its threat display when it "rears up on its hind legs, and brandishes the fore limbs and palpi in the air".

Scorpions perform non-bluffing threat displays, as they have powerful defences, but various predators still eat them. When provoked, they spread their pincers and in some cases raise their abdomens, their tails standing near-erect with the sting ready for immediate use. Some scorpions in addition produce deimatic noises by stridulating with the pedipalps and first legs.

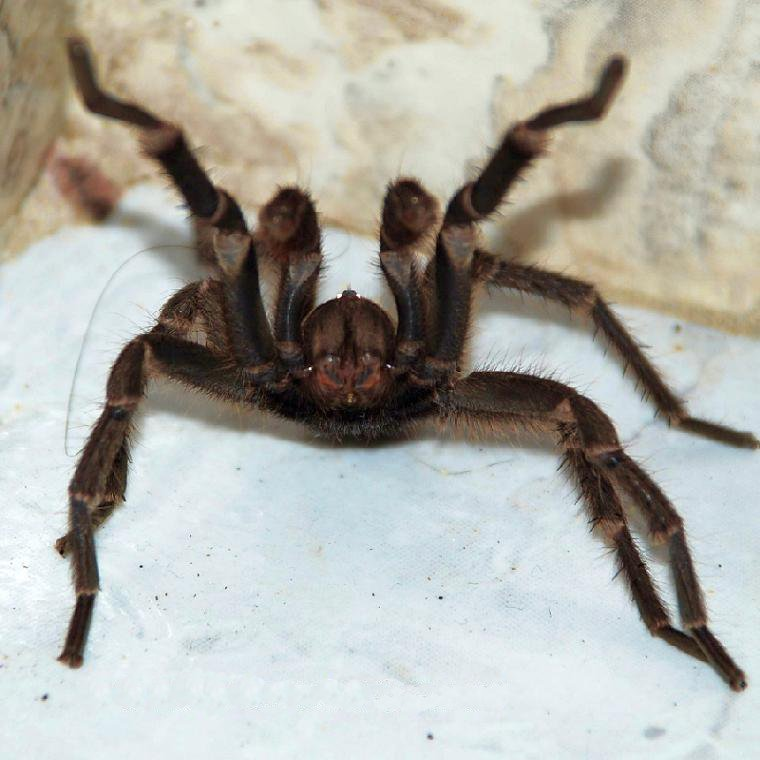
Aposematic threat display of Brazilian tarantula

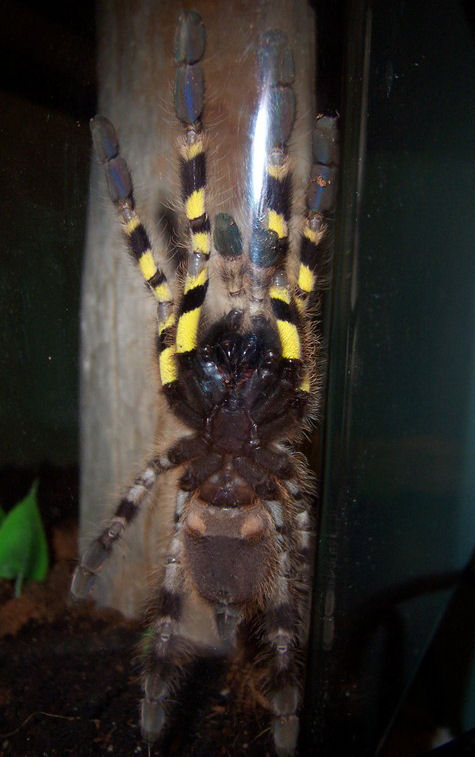
Belly of the spider Poecilotheria regalis. The bright yellow forelegs are used in deimatic displays.

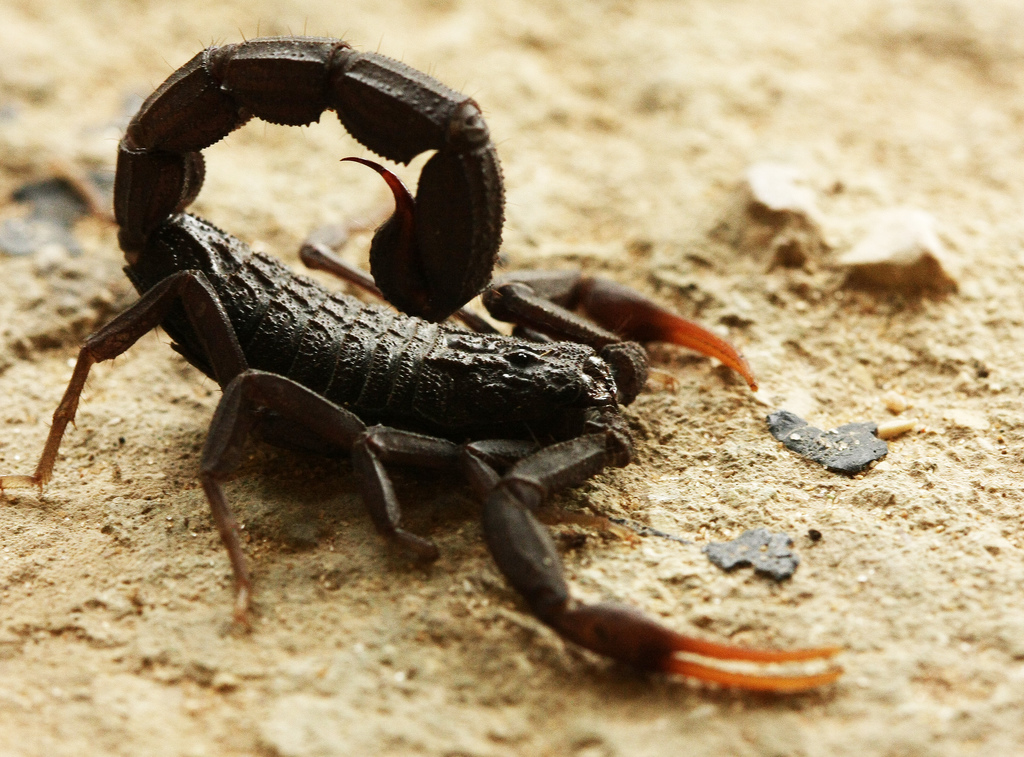
Scorpion's threat display with pincers spread wide, abdomen raised to present sting

== In crustaceans ==
Among crustaceans, Austruca mjoebergi, a species of fiddler crab, relies on its claw for dominance signalling and competition between males. During these conflicts, individuals sometimes lose their claws. Following the loss of a claw a male occasionally regenerates a lighter, weaker claw that is less resource intensive to produce as a bluff to intimidate other males. While these claws are weaker and worse at fighting than claws of similar sizes, they are as effective at intimidation.

== In cephalopods ==
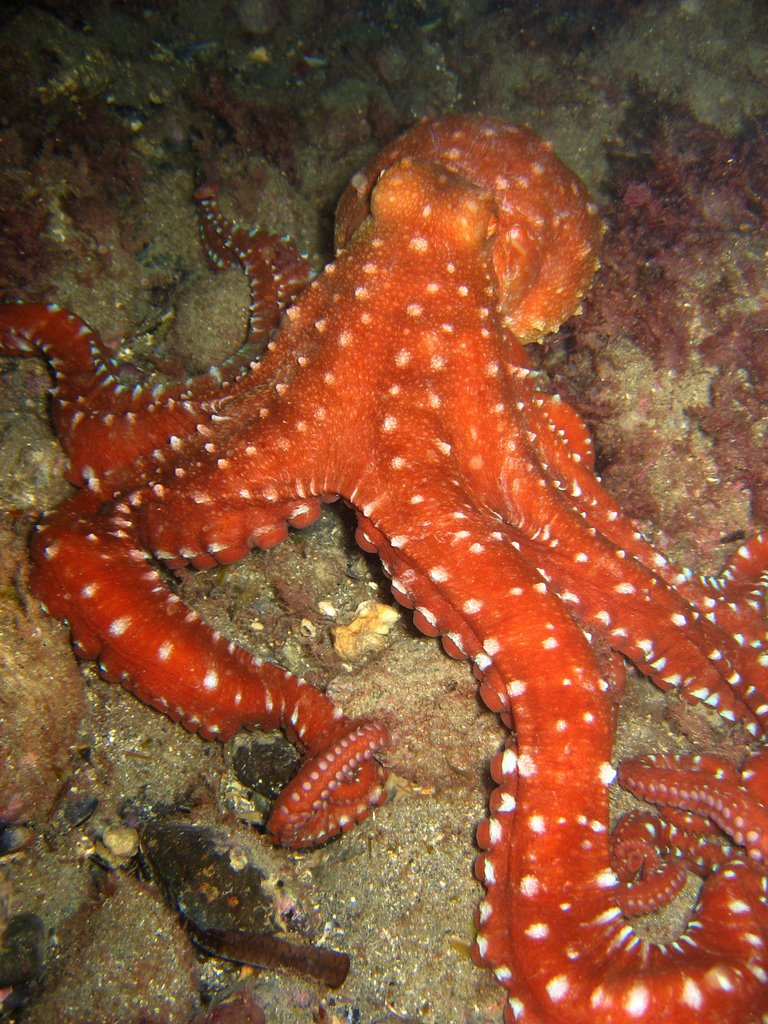
Deimatic display: Callistoctopus macropus generates a bright brownish red colour with white oval spots when disturbed.

Deimatic behaviour is found in cephalopods including the common cuttlefish Sepia officinalis, squid such as the Caribbean reef squid (Sepioteuthis sepioidea) and bigfin reef squid (Sepioteuthis lessoniana), octopuses including the common octopus Octopus vulgaris and the Atlantic white-spotted octopus (Octopus macropus), and the paper nautilus (Argonauta argo). Deimatic cephalopod displays involve suddenly creating bold stripes, often reinforced by stretching out the animal's arms, fins or web to make it look as big and threatening as possible.

For example, in the common cuttlefish the display consists of flattening the body, making the skin pale, showing a pair of eyespots on the mantle, dark eye rings, and a dark line on the fins, and dilating the pupils of the eyes. The common octopus similarly displays pale skin and dark eye rings with dilated pupils, but also curls its arms and stretches out the web between the arms as far as possible, and squirts out jets of water. Other octopuses such as Atlantic white-spotted octopus turn bright brownish red with oval white spots all over in a high contrast display. The paper nautilus can rapidly change its appearance: it suddenly withdraws the shining iridescent web formed by its first pair of arms from its shell.

== In vertebrates ==
Among vertebrates, the Australian frill-necked lizard (Chlamydosaurus kingii) has a startling display in which wide semicircular frills on either side of the head are fanned out; the mouth is opened wide exposing the gape; the tail is waved over the body, and the body is raised, so that the animal appears as large and threatening as possible.

Frogs such as Physalaemus nattereri, Physalaemus deimaticus, and Pleurodema brachyops have a warning display behaviour. These animals inflate themselves with air and raise their hind parts to appear as large as possible, and display brightly coloured markings and eyespots to intimidate predators. Seven species of frogs in the genus Pleurodema have lumbar glands (making the animals distasteful, so in their case the display is likely aposematic); these glands are usually boldly contrasted in black as a further warning.

Non-bluffing (aposematic) displays occur in mammals which possess powerful defences such as spines or stink glands, and which habitually warn off potential predators rather than attempting escape by running. The lowland streaked tenrec (Hemicentetes semispinosus) raises the spines on its head and back when confronted by a predator, and moves its head up and down. Porcupines such as Erethizon erect their long sharp quills and adopt a hunched, head-down posture when a predator is nearby. The spotted skunk (Spilogale putorius) balances on its front legs, its body raised vertically with its bold pelage pattern conspicuously displayed, and its tail (near the scent glands) raised and spread out.

The domestic cat arches its back and experiences piloerection when its sympathetic nervous system senses danger. This is an attempt to appear larger and more intimidating so attackers will see fighting as disadvantageous.

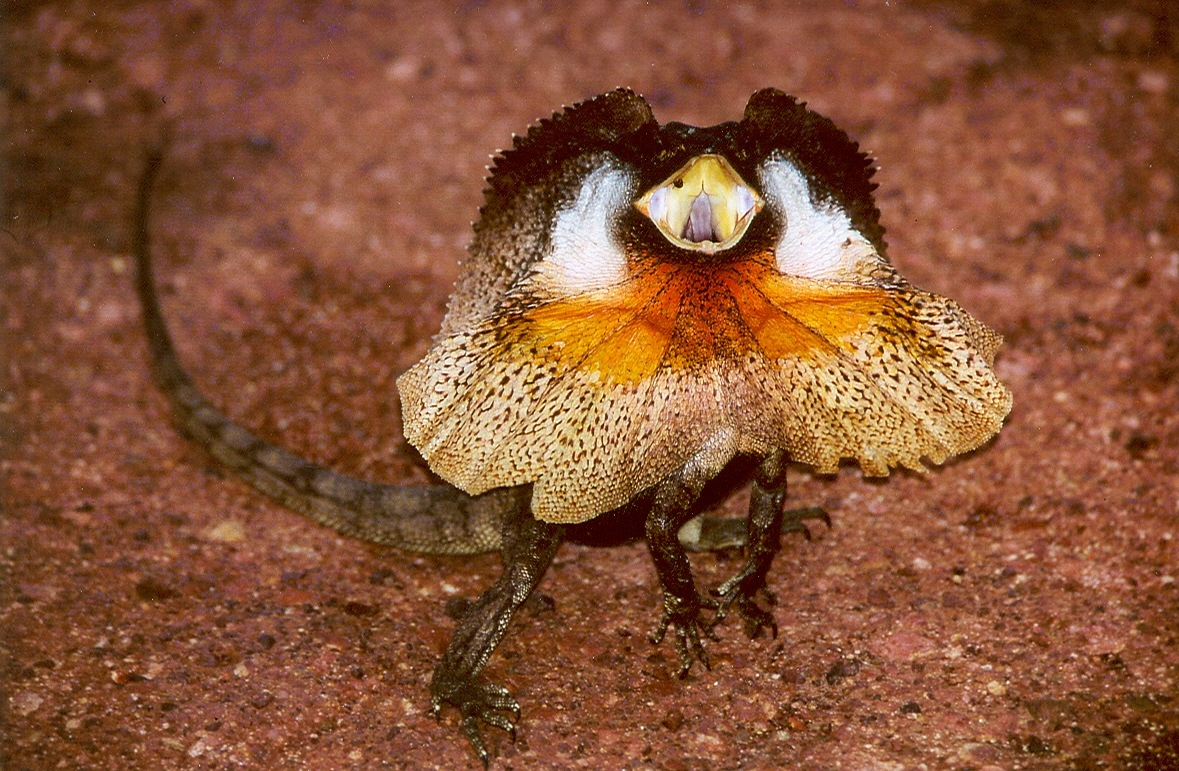
Frill-necked lizard faces predators, making itself look big with head frills, raising its body and waving its tail

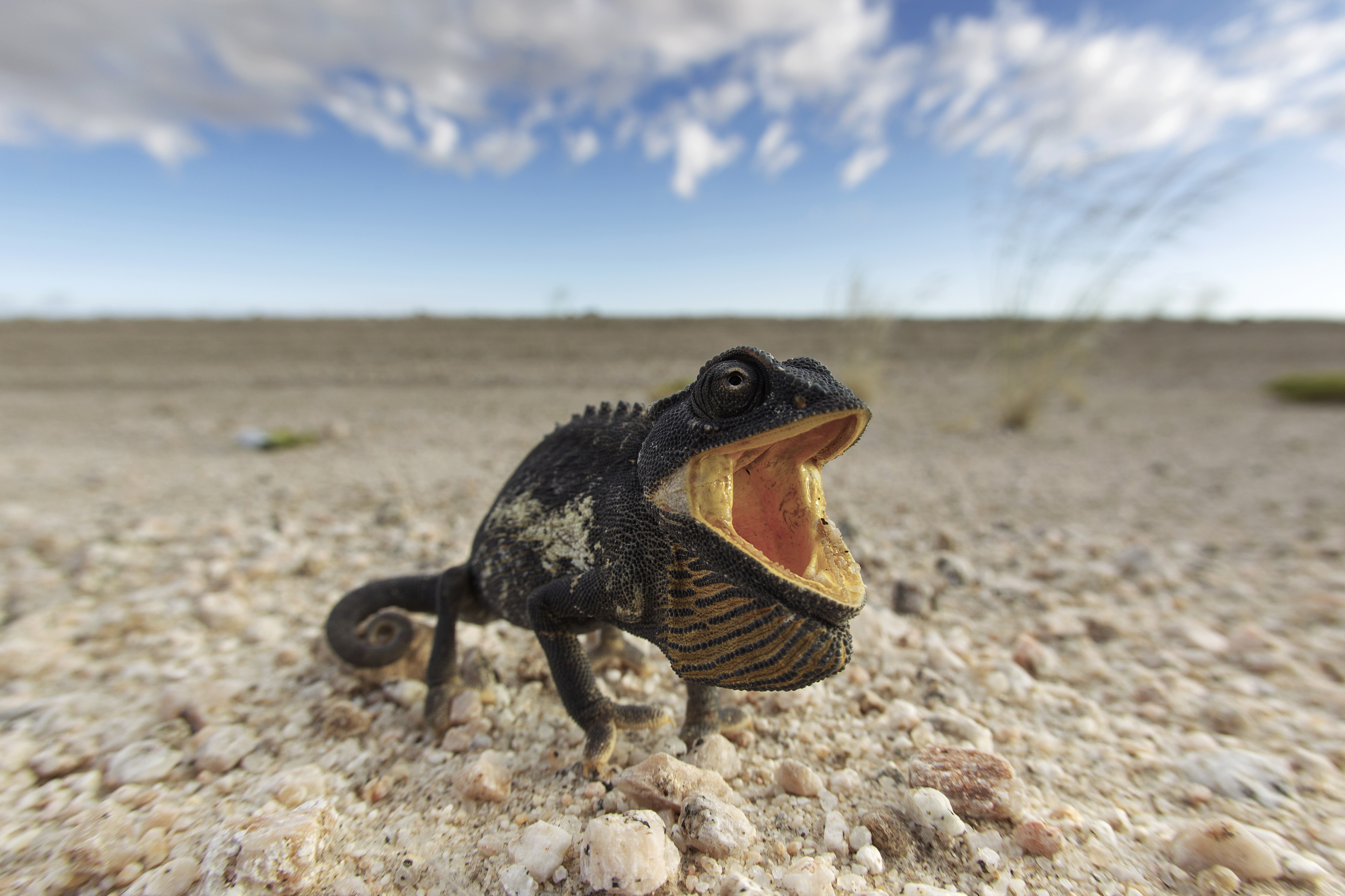
Namaqua chameleon showing threat display with dewlap

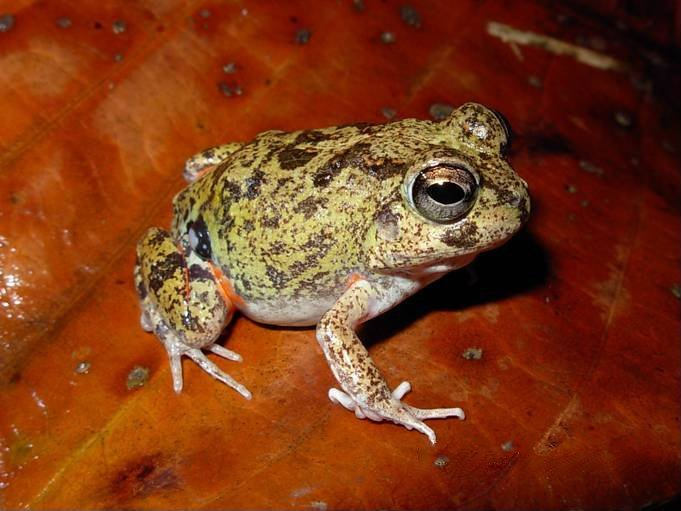
Colombian four-eyed frog, Pleurodema brachyops

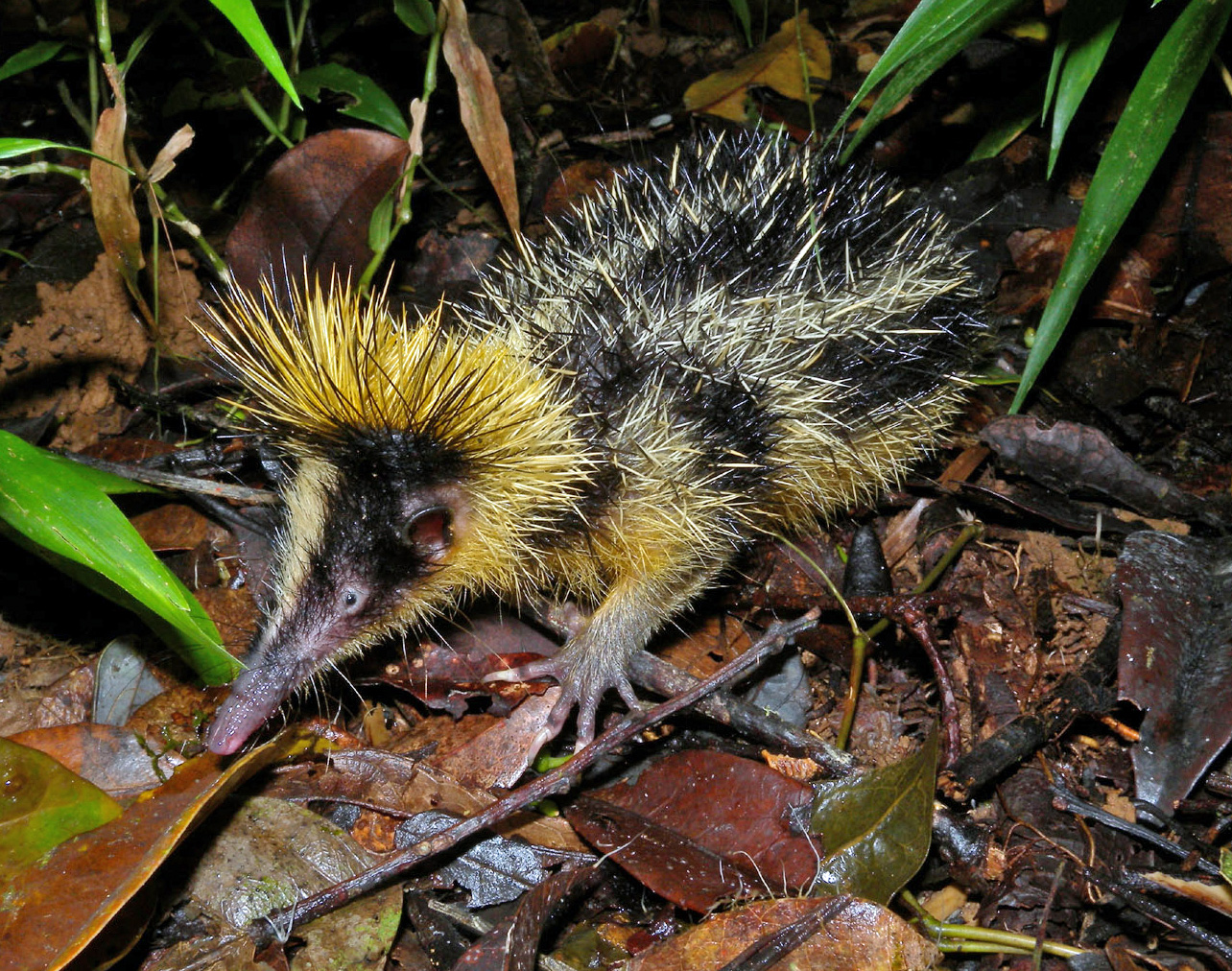
Lowland streaked tenrec, Hemicentetes semispinosus, erects spines on head and body when threatened.

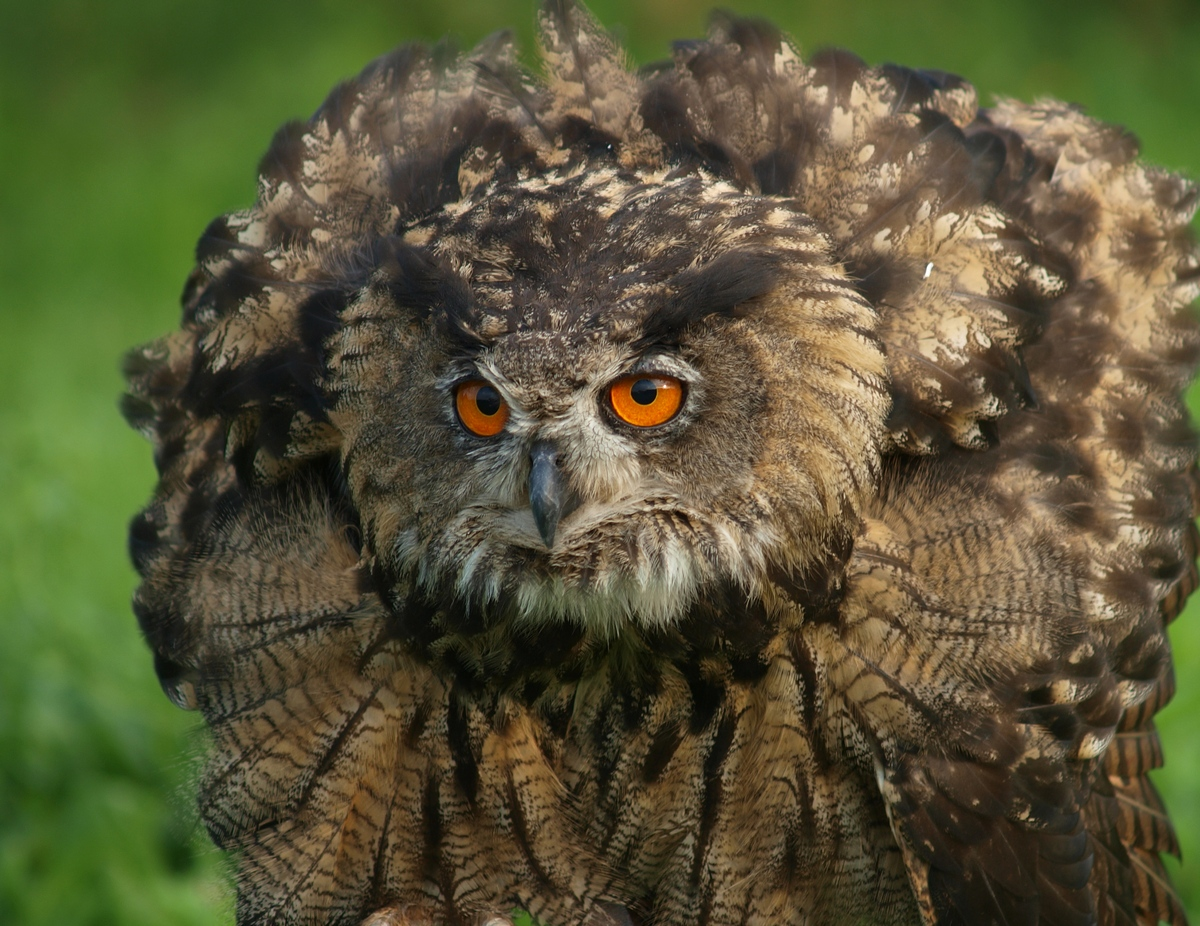
Eurasian eagle owl, Bubo bubo, erects the feathers on its neck to make itself appear larger.

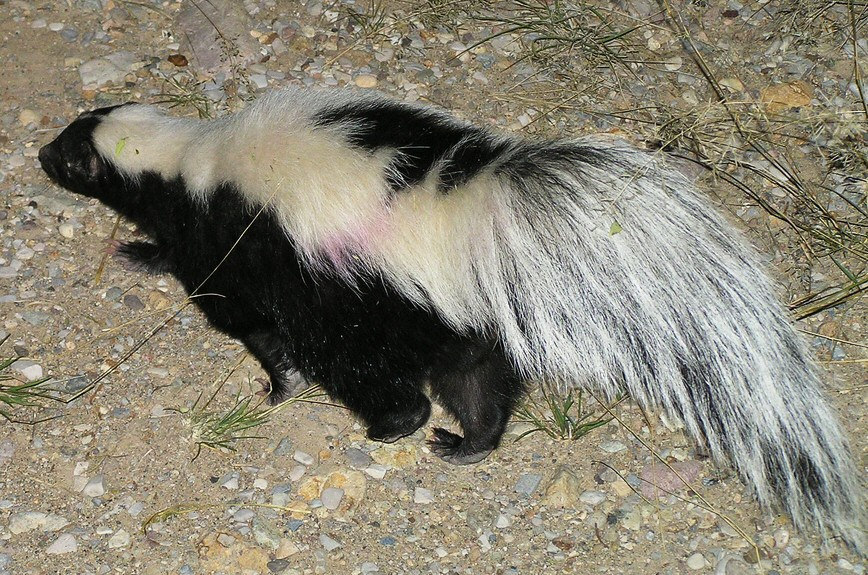
Striped skunk, Mephitis mephitis, displays prominent lighter markings against black, with raised bushy tail, honestly advertising its squirting scent glands.

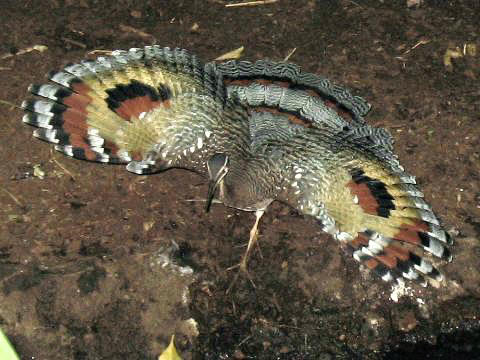
A Sunbittern, Eurypyga helias, opening its wings to display two large eye spots when threatened

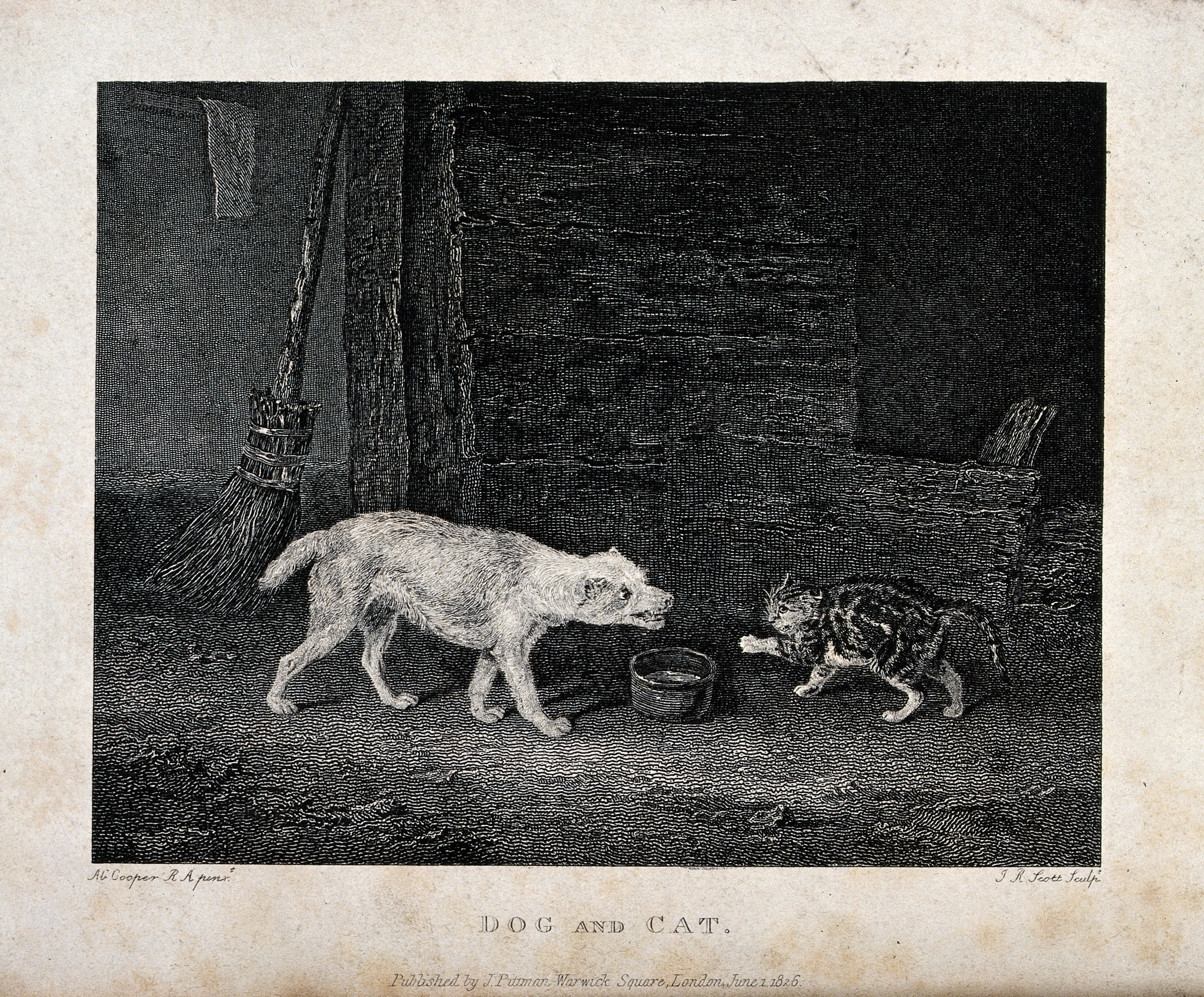
A cat puffing up its fur and arching its back to appear larger in hopes of scaring away a dog

== Deimatic or aposematic? ==
Rattlesnake sound (length 15 s)

In a study of the rattling made by rattlesnakes of different species, the Canadian zoologists Brock Fenton and Lawrence Licht found that the sounds are always similar: they have rapid onset (starting suddenly, and reaching full volume in a few milliseconds); they consist of a "broadband" mixture of frequencies between 2 kHz and 20 kHz, with little energy either in the ultrasonic (above 20 kHz) or in the rattlesnakes' hearing range (below 700 Hz); and the frequencies do not change much with time (the rattling after two minutes having a similar spectrum to that at onset). There was no clear difference in the sounds made by the different species measured: Crotalus horridus, Crotalus adamanteus, Crotalus atrox, Crotalus cerastes, Crotalus viridis and Sistrurus catenatus. This pattern implies that the rattling "could serve as a general attention-getting device", which "is designed as a deimatic or startle display". Its similarity to the "broadband, harsh sounds" used as warning calls by birds and mammals may enhance its effectiveness. Since rattlesnakes can barely hear the sound, it is unlikely to serve as any form of communication to other snakes of the same species. Finally, the sounds are not in themselves loud enough to cause pain and hence keep predators away.

Fenton and Licht note that the effect of a rattlesnake's rattling could be deimatic (startle) in inexperienced animals, whether predators or large animals that might injure the snake by stepping on it, but aposematic (a warning signal) in animals that are aware of the rattle's meaning. They refer to the work of Fenton and his colleague David Bates on the responses of the big brown bat, Eptesicus fuscus, to the defensive clicks made by moths in the family Arctiidae, which includes the garden tiger moth, Arctia caja. This family includes large, furry, bitter-tasting or poisonous moths. They found that while sounds can startle inexperienced bats, after a few trials the bats ignored the sounds if the prey was edible; but the same sounds can warn experienced bats of bitter-tasting prey (an honest signal).

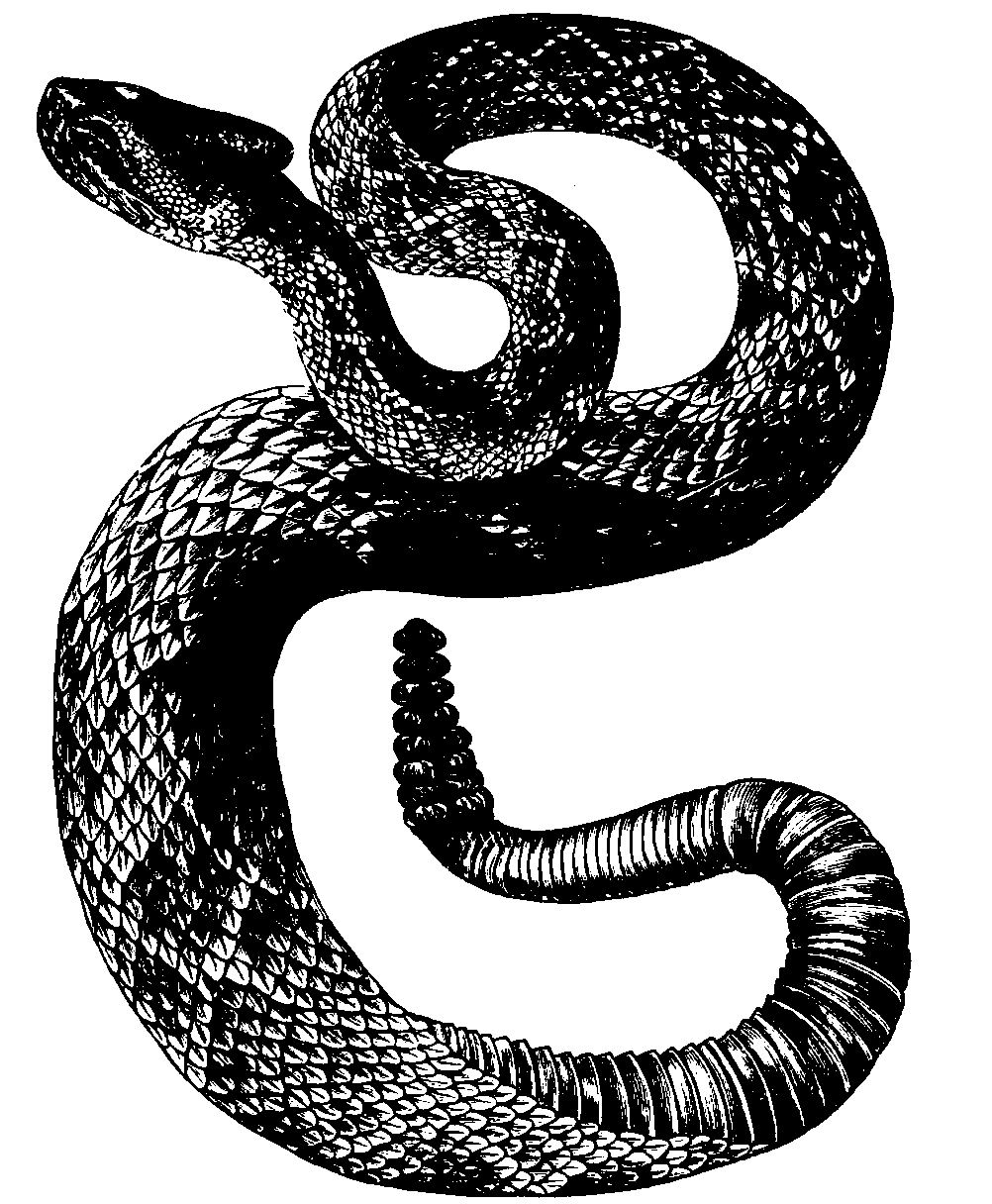
Rattlesnake raising rattle on tail, drawn by St. George Mivart, On The Genesis of Species, 1871. The rattle may both startle inexperienced predators and warn off experienced ones.

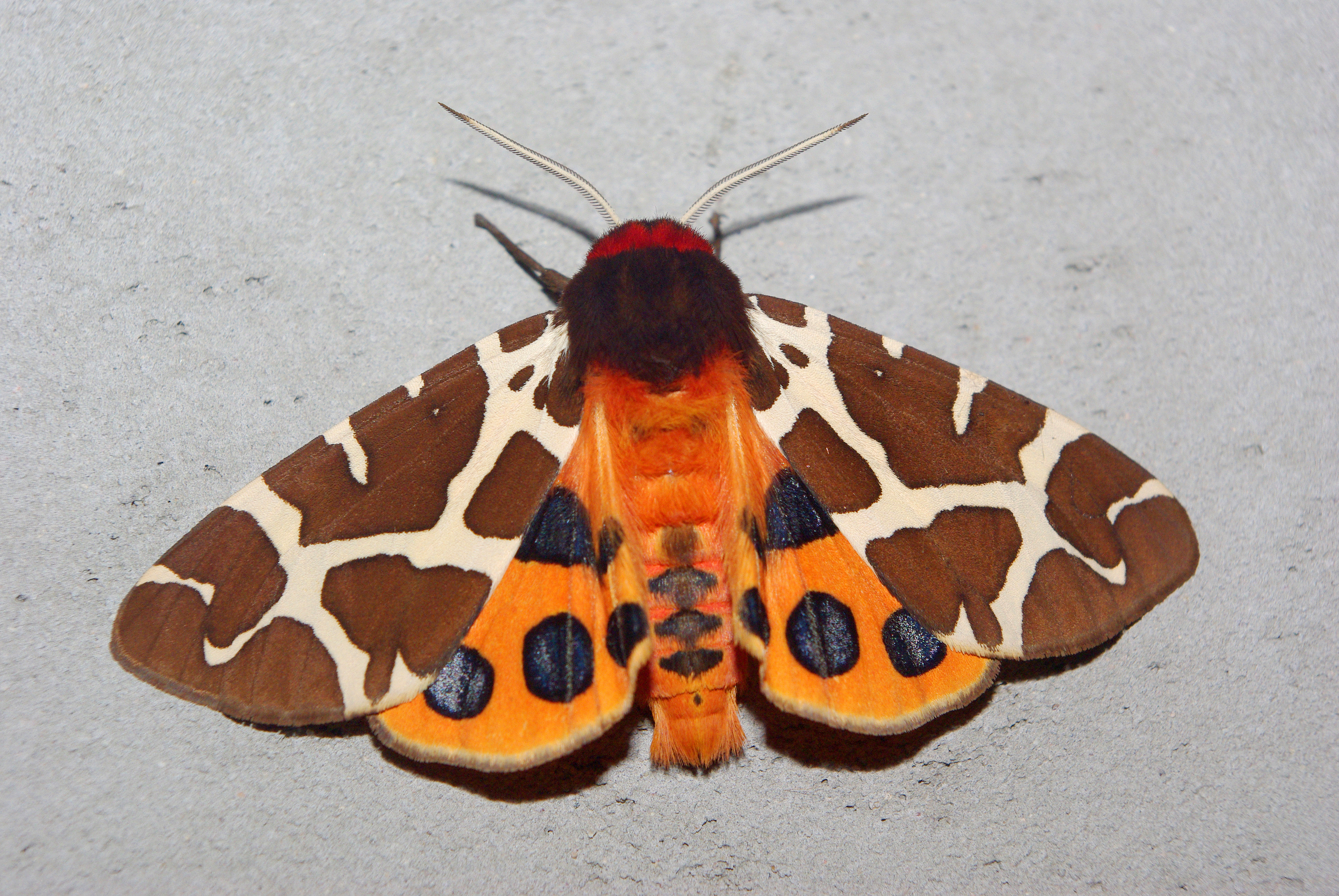
Garden tiger moth, Arctia caja, displays startling bright pattern of black spots on orange-red hindwings. The insect is bitter-tasting, so the pattern may be aposematic as well as deimatic.

== See also ==
- Animal coloration
- Cheating (biology)
- Deception in animals
- Signalling theory

== Sources ==
- Cott, Hugh B. (1940). Adaptive Coloration in Animals. London: Methuen.
