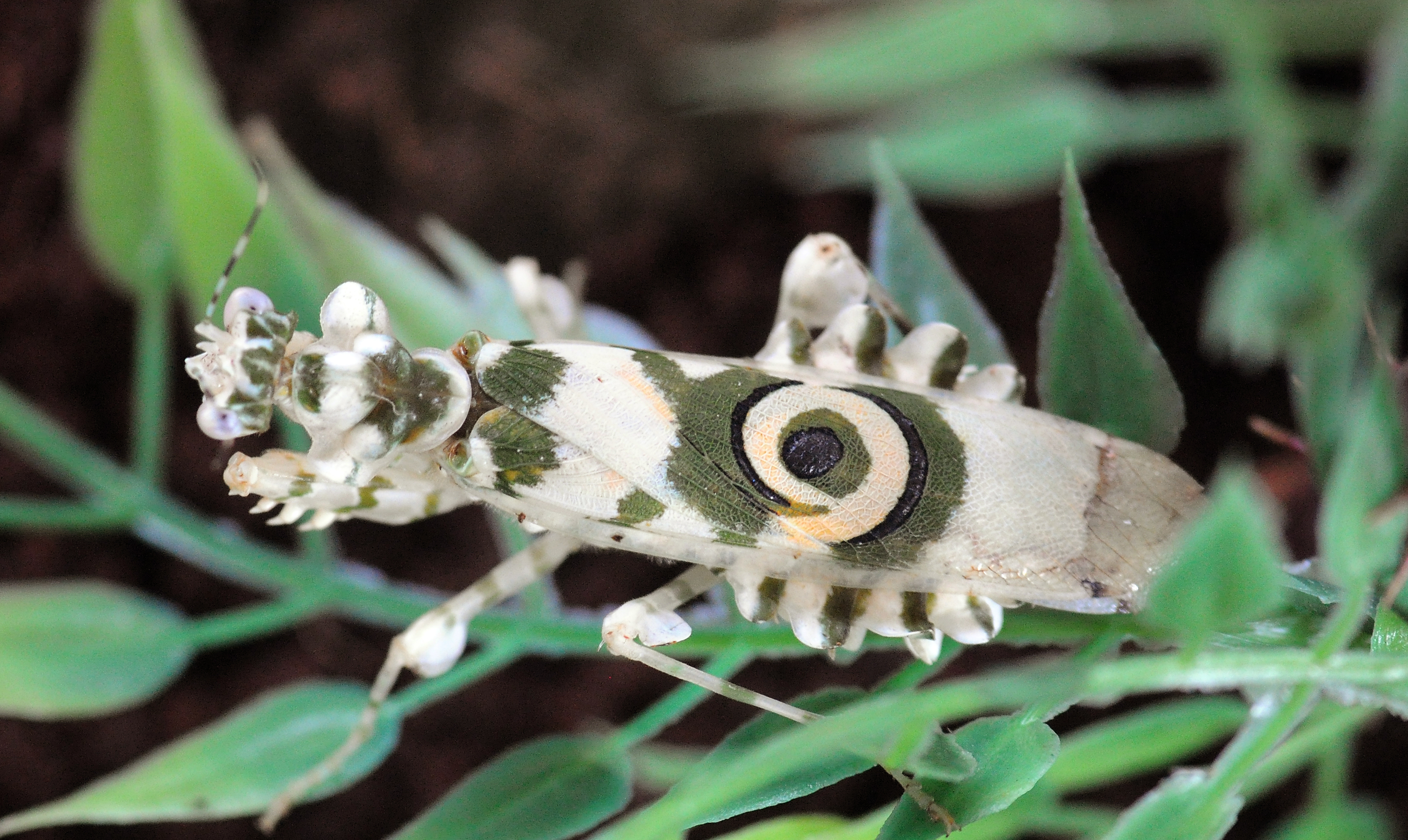
- P. wahlbergi adult
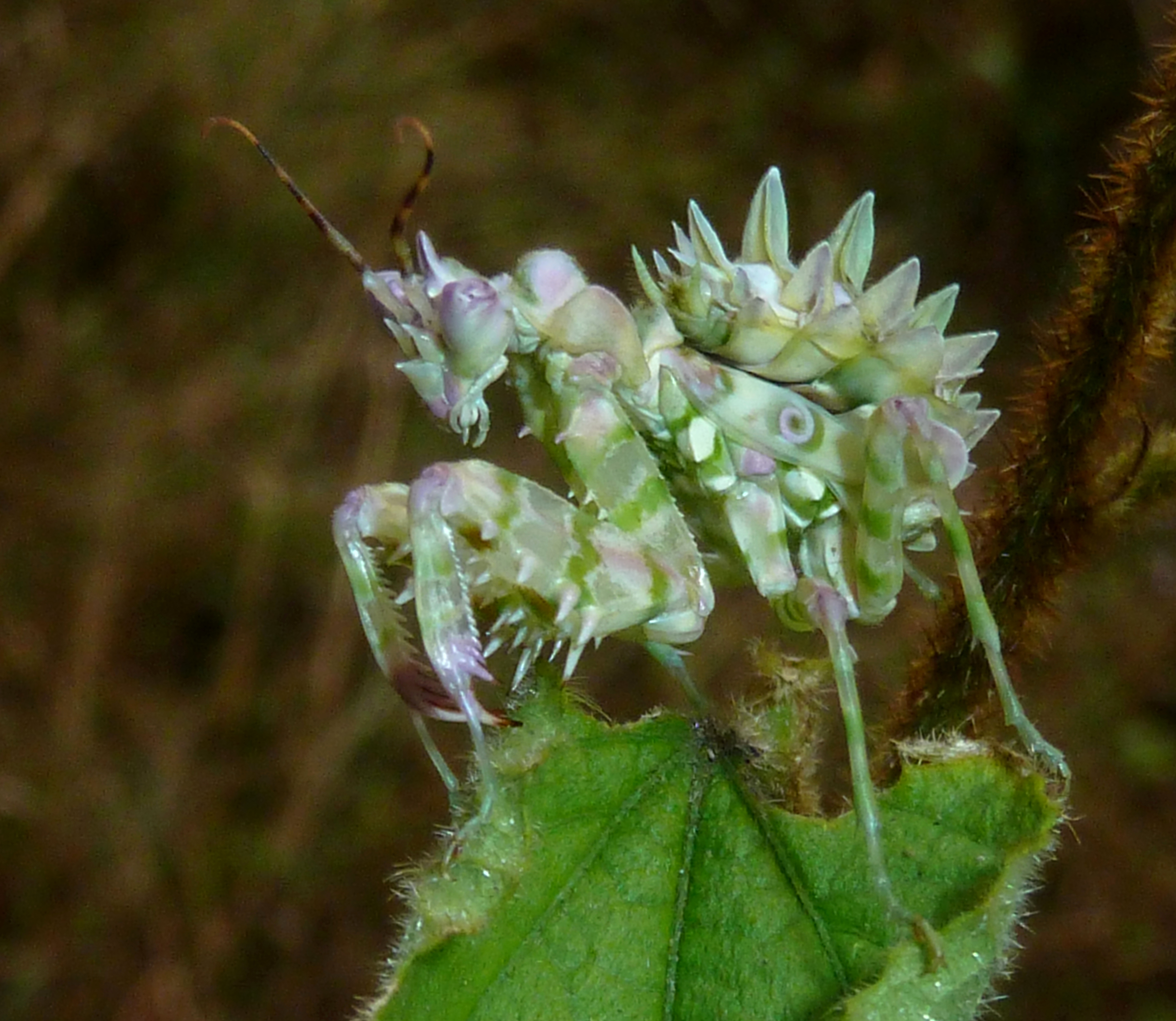
- P. wahlbergi nymph

Scientific classification
- Kingdom: Animalia
- Phylum: Arthropoda
- Clade: Pancrustacea
- Class: Insecta
- Order: Mantodea
- Family: Hymenopodidae
- Subfamily: Hymenopodinae
- Tribe: Hymenopodini
- Subtribe: Pseudocreobotrina
- Genus: Pseudocreobotra; Saussure, 1870

Synonyms
- Theomantis Giglio-Tos, 1915

= Pseudocreobotra =

Genus of praying mantises

Pseudocreobotra is a genus of Sub-Saharan flower mantises. They are visually similar to Creobroter species of Asia, but belong to different subfamilies. Their forewings have prominent spiralled eyespots, which are flashed in a silent deimatic display, to startle would-be predators. The nymphs however, expand the raised abdomen in response to threats, to reveal a single dorsal eyespot. The species are easily reared in captivity.

== Species ==
The species include:

- Pseudocreobotra amarae Rehn, 1901
- Pseudocreobotra ocellata Beauvois, 1805
- Pseudocreobotra wahlbergi Stål, 1871

== See also ==
- List of mantis genera and species
- Flower mantis
