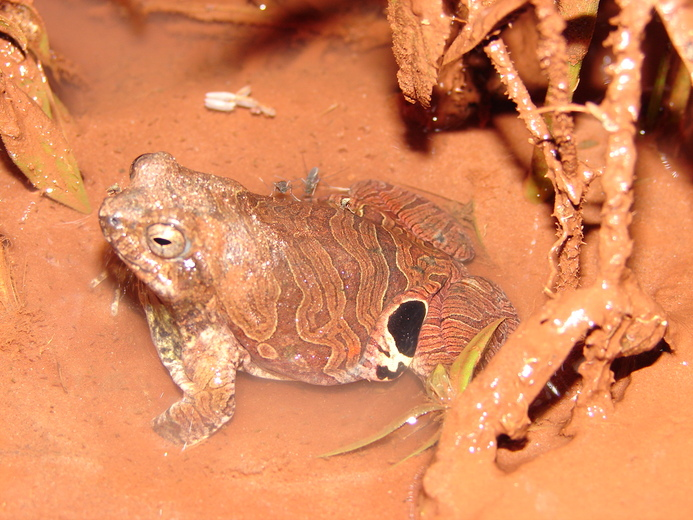
- An adult individual

Conservation status
- Least Concern (IUCN 3.1)

Scientific classification
- Kingdom: Animalia
- Phylum: Chordata
- Class: Amphibia
- Order: Anura
- Family: Leptodactylidae
- Genus: Physalaemus
- Species: P. nattereri

Binomial name
- Physalaemus nattereri (Steindachner, 1863)

Synonyms
- Eupomplyx marmoratus Jan, 1857 — nomen nudum; Eupemphix nattereri Steindachner, 1863; Eupemphix marmoratus Steindachner, 1864 — nomen nudum; Paludicola edentula Boettger, 1885

= Physalaemus nattereri =

Species of amphibian

Physalaemus nattereri (common name: Cuyaba dwarf frog) is a frog native to central and southeastern Brazil and eastern Bolivia and Paraguay. It inhabits savanna and Cerrado regions, always near permanent or temporary water bodies such as ponds and swamps, where it typically nests. The species is not adapted to areas with human activity.

Males have an average length of 4.7 centimeters (1.9 in), while females measure 4.9 centimeters (1.9 in). The dorsal coloration ranges from light brown to dark brown or reddish, featuring a mosaic of darker spots or stripes. The ventral surface is light brown with dark spots. The species is unmistakable in its habitat due to a pair of ocelli on the posterior part of its body. Its testicles and other organs are brightly colored, a rare trait among anurans, caused by a high concentration of melanocytes.

Its diet is generalist and opportunistic, primarily consisting of termites and ants. Despite an effective defense strategy and highly potent toxins, it can be preyed upon by various animals, including birds and beetles. Its primary predators are giant water bugs, which often attack during reproduction and metamorphosis. One defense mechanism is deimatic behaviour, where the frog inflates its lungs, lowers its head, and raises its posterior, displaying its ocelli to startle predators, appearing as a larger animal facing them. Additionally, its ocelli contain venomous macro glands that produce a fast-acting toxin with a median lethal dose comparable to that of a jararaca snake.

Its reproduction is explosive, meaning all individuals gather synchronously at breeding sites for a few days, typically between October and January. Males form choruses and vocalize after heavy rainfall exceeding 50 millimeters to attract females. Their call consists of simple, multi-pulsed, harmonic notes. During amplexus, which is axillary, the pair moves to the water's edge, where they deposit approximately 3 500 eggs in a foam nest. The nest is created from mucus secreted by the female, whipped into foam by the male's hind legs in a motion akin to whisking egg whites. The tadpoles have a grayish-brown dorsum and a globular body. Their metamorphosis takes 20 to 30 days.

== Taxonomy ==
The species was described in 1863 by Austrian researcher Franz Steindachner in a publication of the Austrian Academy of Sciences that same year. It was identified as a new species based on its smooth skin; absence of vomerine teeth, parotoid glands, or hypertrophied forearm tubercles (a protrusion on the front of the forearm); lack of a visible tympanum; and the formation of foam nests for its eggs. At the time, the species was known only from Cuiabá, Mato Grosso.

It was originally named Eupemphix nattereri, but the genus Eupemphix was later merged into Physalaemus following studies by Hampton Parker in 1927 and John Lynch in 1970. The species received the epithet nattereri in honor of Johann Natterer. In Brazil, it is commonly known as the four-eyed frog due to the pair of ocelli on its back, resembling an additional pair of eyes.

== Distribution and conservation ==
Physalaemus nattereri is found in the Central-West, Southeast, and Northeast regions of Brazil, as well as eastern Paraguay and Bolivia, in areas with altitudes ranging from sea level to 1,500 meters (4,900 ft). It is fossorial and seasonal, highly adapted to the continental semi-arid climate. The species inhabits savanna and low-vegetation areas of the Cerrado, typically near permanent or temporary water bodies such as ponds and swamps, where it nests. It is not adapted to areas degraded by human activity.

The International Union for Conservation of Nature (IUCN) classifies it as a least concern species, due to its common occurrence. However, its population is declining and threatened by the expansion of intensive agriculture in its range. Some portions of its distribution area are encompassed by environmental parks, which reduces the risk to the species. Including this species, the genus Physalaemus comprises a total of 47 species.

== Description ==
The frog's dorsum varies from light brown to dark brown or reddish, with a mosaic of darker spots and stripes. A distinctive feature is the presence of two large black ocelli over glands in the inguinal region. The inner thigh is white with black, vermiform spots. Its abdomen is light brown with darker spots of the same hue. Males average 4.7 centimeters (1.9 in) in length, while females average 4.9 centimeters (1.9 in). It has a robust trunk, ranging from 29.8 to 50.6 millimeters (1.17 to 1.99 in) in width. Its head is wider than its body. The diameter of the eye equals the distance between the two orbits. It has large inguinal glands but lacks sacral glands. Its snout and canthus are rounded, and the loreal region is concave. The vocal sac is well-developed, and the snout is rounded. The species lacks parotoid glands.

A rare characteristic of the species is that males have brightly colored testicles, often with spots of other colors, a trait known in only five other amphibian species, such as Physalaemus cuvieri. This pigmentation also occurs in other organs, including the kidneys, peritoneum, and spleen. It results from a high concentration of melanocytes, possibly due to an interaction between these cells and the vascular system of these tissues.

The species can be easily distinguished from other anurans in the same region due to its unique and readily observable traits, such as the pair of ocelli on its dorsum, a feature shared only with Physalaemus deimaticus. However, P. deimaticus is smaller, has a different dorsal mosaic, and is found only in the Serra do Cipó, Minas Gerais.

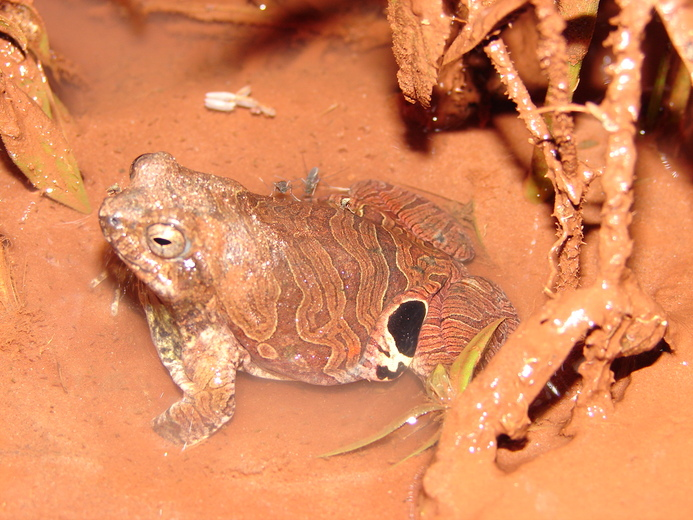

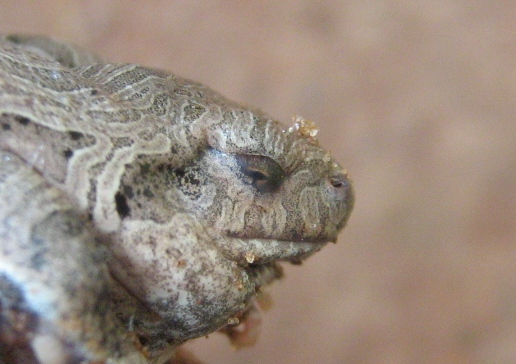

== Dietary habits ==
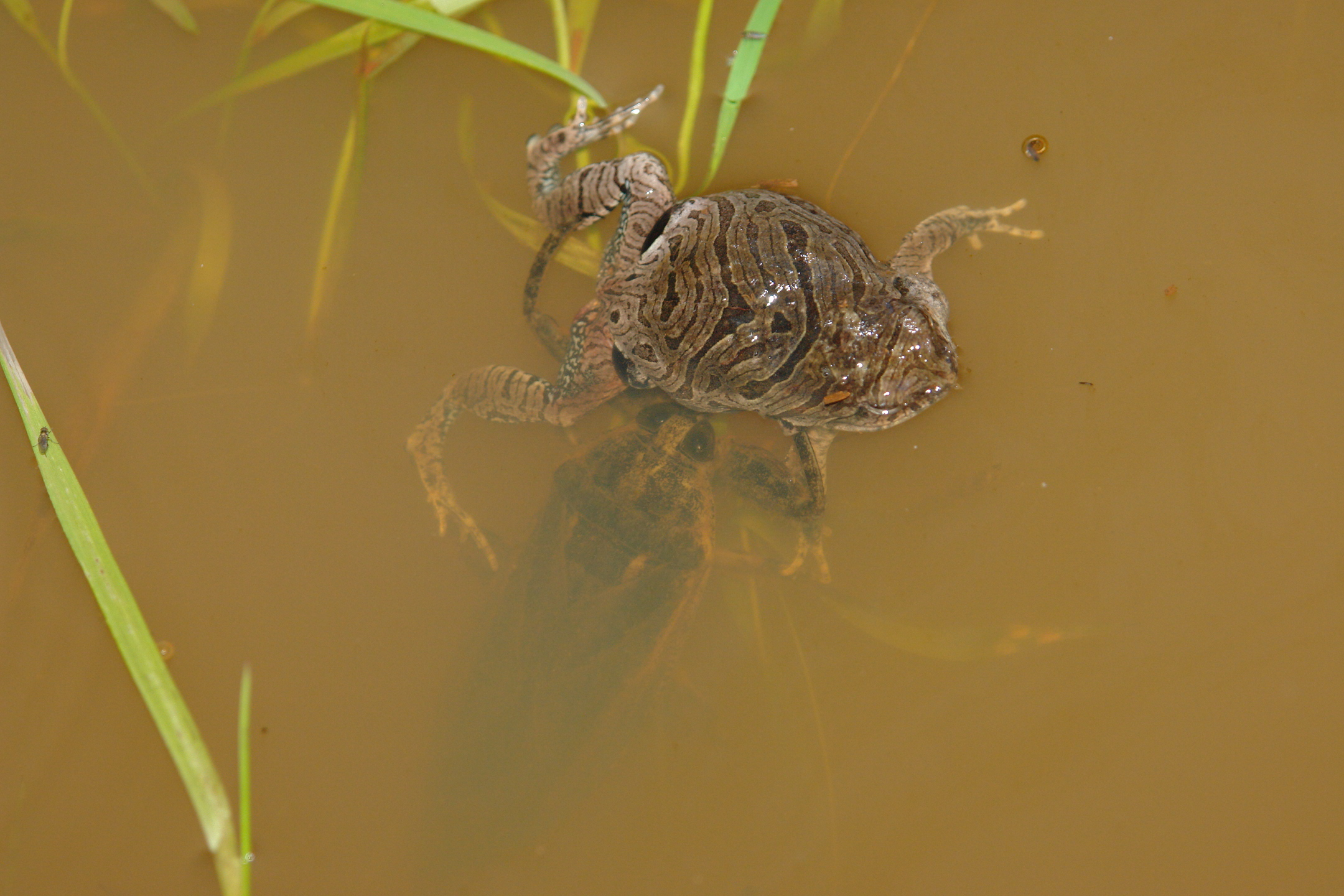
A giant water bug (Lethocerus sp.) preying on an individual.

The frog exhibits a generalist and opportunistic feeding behavior, consuming whatever food is available without specific preferences. Studies conducted in Jaboticabal and Guaíra, São Paulo, showed that the species primarily feeds on termites, which constitute 85.65% of the diet in adults. In juveniles, this percentage drops to 69.75%, with an increase in consumption of ants, rising from 14.01% to 29.74%. These data indicate that, despite its generalist nature, the species prefers social insects, such as ants and termites.

Despite its deimatic behaviour and toxins for defense, it is often attacked by several predators, including birds and hemipterans. Its most common predators are giant water bugs, particularly Lethocerus delpontei and Lethocerus annulipes. Such predation occurs in water ponds where individuals reproduce or tadpoles undergo metamorphosis, indicating greater vulnerability during these periods. This makes giant water bugs significant in population control during the reproductive season and in regulating the structure of the ecological community.

== Reproduction ==
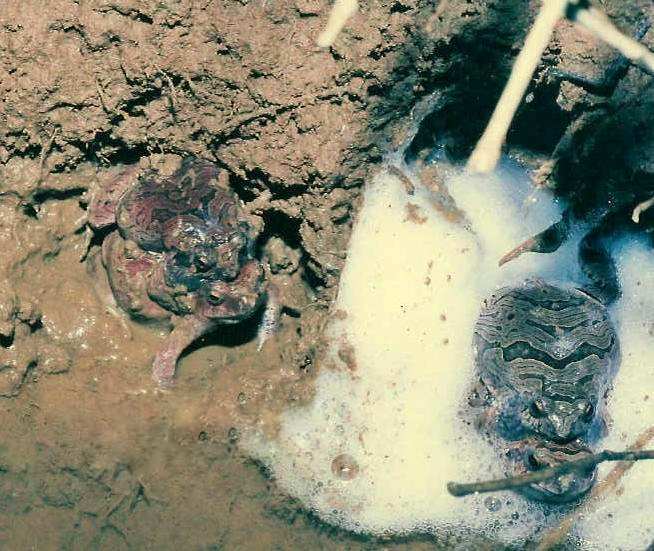
Two pairs in amplexus, producing a foam nest.

A study in Bodoquena (in Mato Grosso do Sul, state of Brazil) found Physalaemus nattereri to be an explosive breeder, meaning all individuals gather synchronously for a few days, typically between October and January. Males form choruses to attract females, vocalizing after heavy rainfall (exceeding 50 millimeters (2.0 in) daily). Its vocalization ranges between 530 and 1 620 hertz, with a dominant frequency of 710 Hz, featuring simple, multi-pulsed, harmonic notes. During amplexus, which is axillary, the pair moves to the pond's edge, laying approximately 3 500 eggs in a foam nest. The nest is formed from mucus secreted by the female, with the male increasing its volume by whipping it with his hind legs, similar to whisking egg whites. They may produce communal egg masses. According to the list of anuran reproductive modes by Célio Haddad and Cynthia Prado, this species employs Mode 11. Ovaries made about 22% of female body mass; fecundity increased with the female body size.

Its tadpoles are exotrophic, feeding in the water, with a grayish-brown dorsum and a lighter venter. Their labial tooth row formula (LTRF) is 2(2)/3(1). They are benthic, with a globular body. They primarily feed on microalgae and are poorly resistant to moisture stress. Their metamorphosis lasts on average 20 to 30 days.

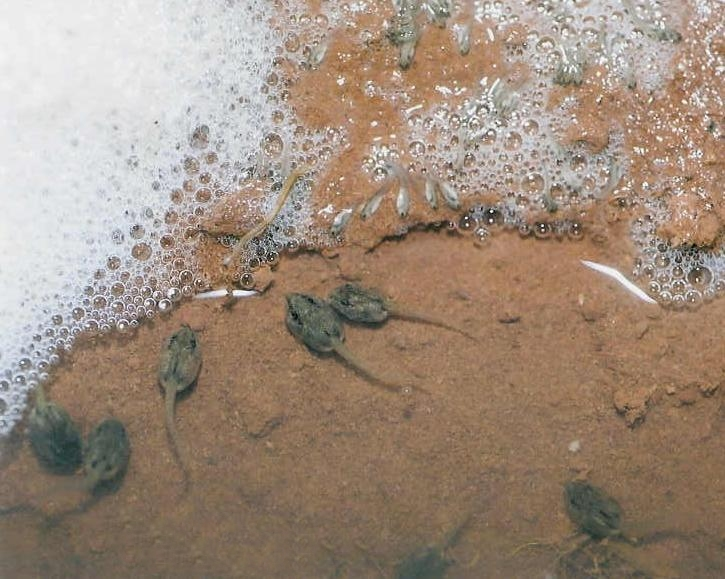
Tadpoles

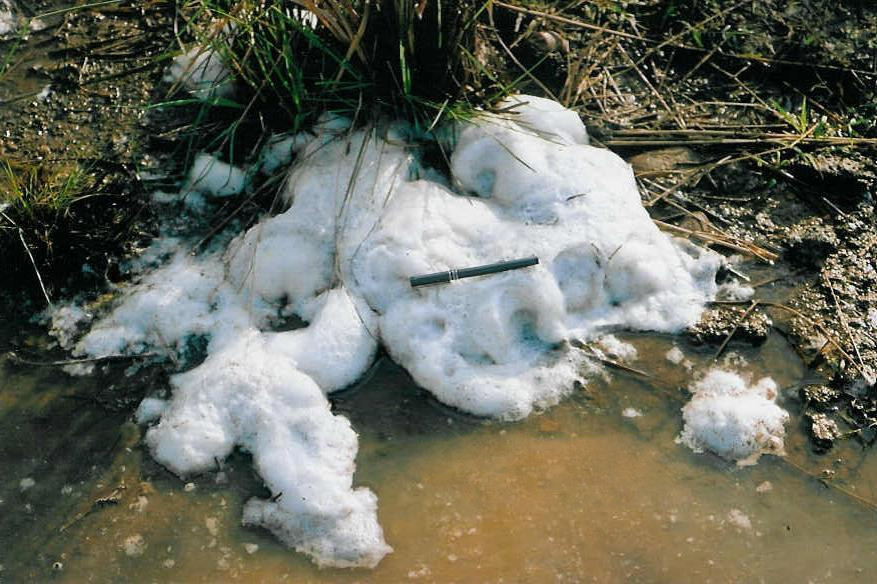
eggs

== Behavior ==
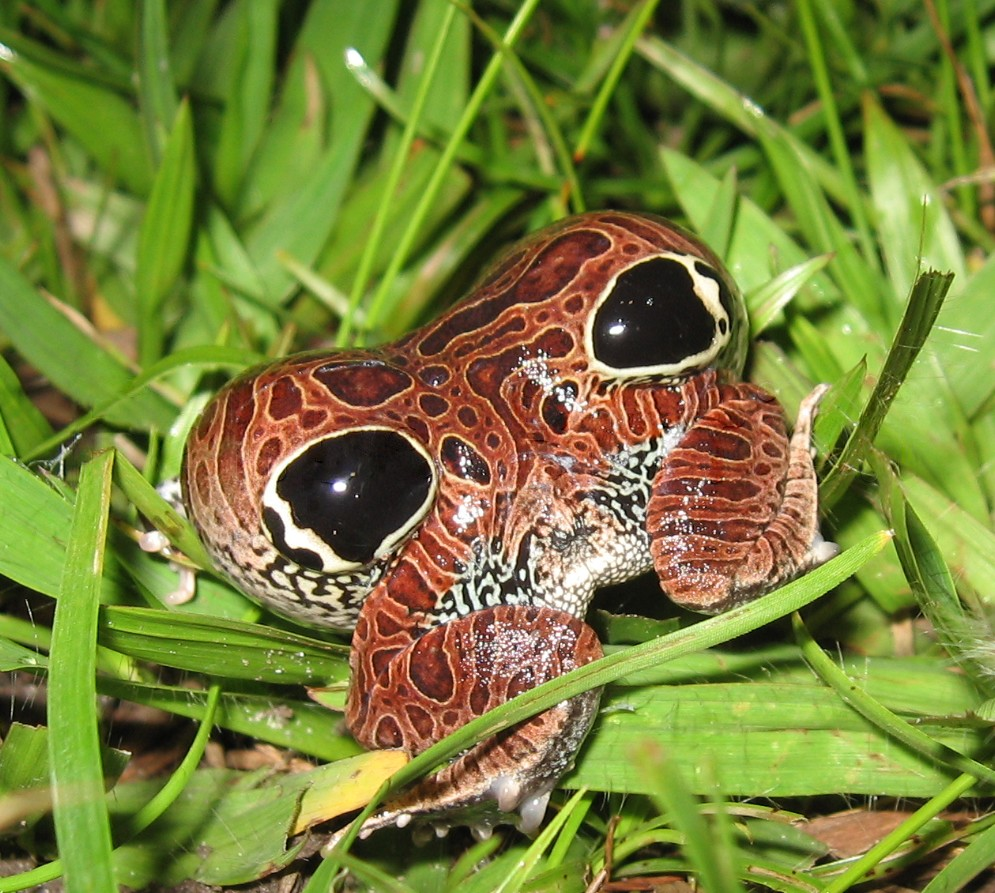
An individual displaying deimatic behavior.

These frogs are terrestrial and nocturnal. A striking feature is their deimatic behaviour, using a pair of ocelli in the inguinal region to deter predators. When threatened and unable to escape, the frog inflates its lungs, lowers its head, closes its eyelids, and raises its posterior, creating the illusion of a larger animal facing the potential predator. In some cases, it places its forelimbs over its head. This behavior is also observed in Pleurodema bibroni and Physalaemus deimaticus.

In addition to deimatic behavior, the four-eyed frog has venomous macro glands within its ocelli to repel attackers. The gland structure is similar to that of species like Bufo jimi and Phyllomedusa distincta, consisting of closely packed alveoli arranged like a honeycomb, held together by collagen fibers. Its toxin, composed of various gelatinases, has a median lethal dose (LD_{50}) of 27 micrograms, comparable to that of the jararaca snake, with quick effects on vertebrates. The toxin repels predators such as coatis, snakes (especially Xenodon merremii), birds, and bats (Trachops cirrhosus). The venom is not lethal to humans, as its maximum toxicity affects smaller animals, but it may cause irritation if the secretion reaches the eyes.
