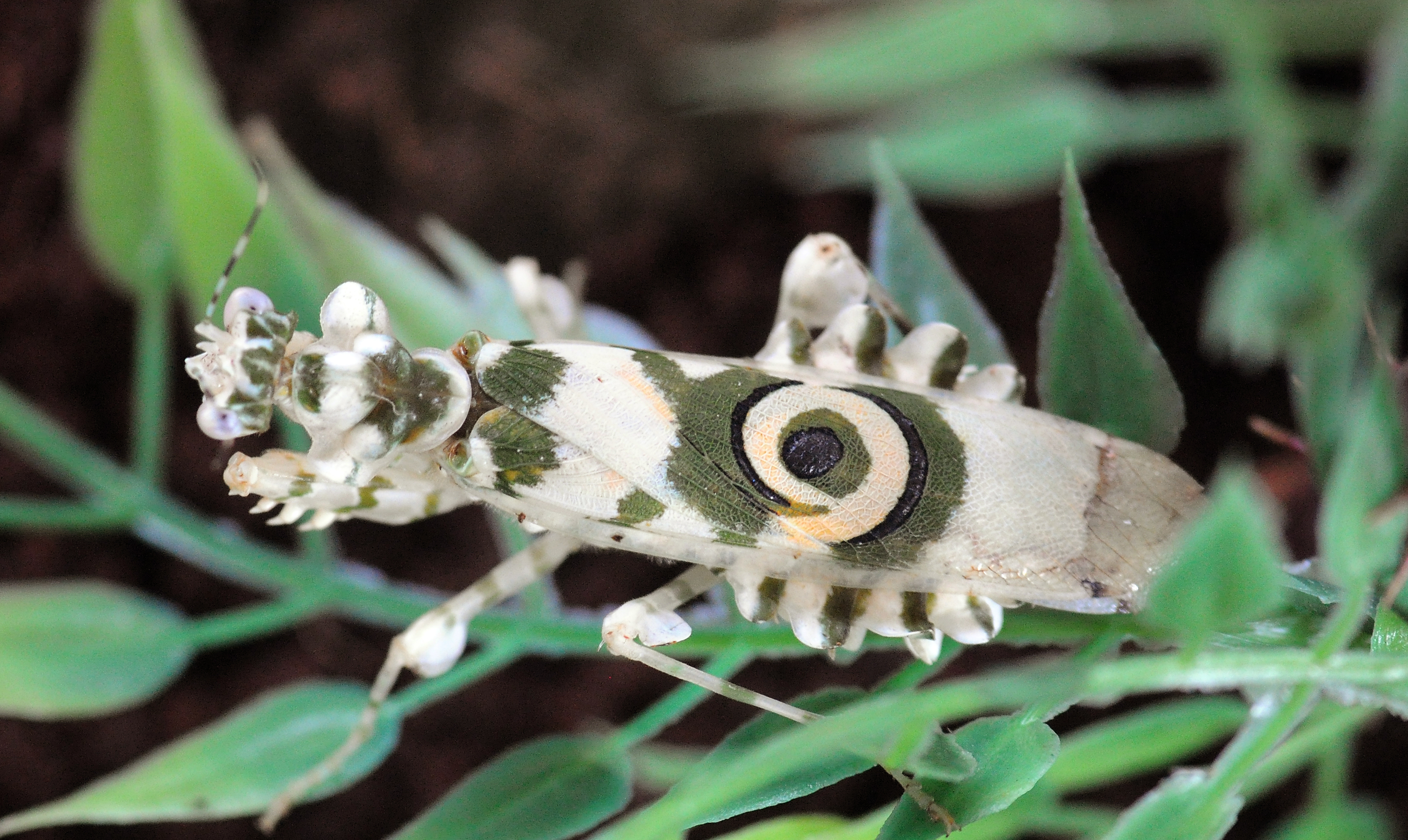

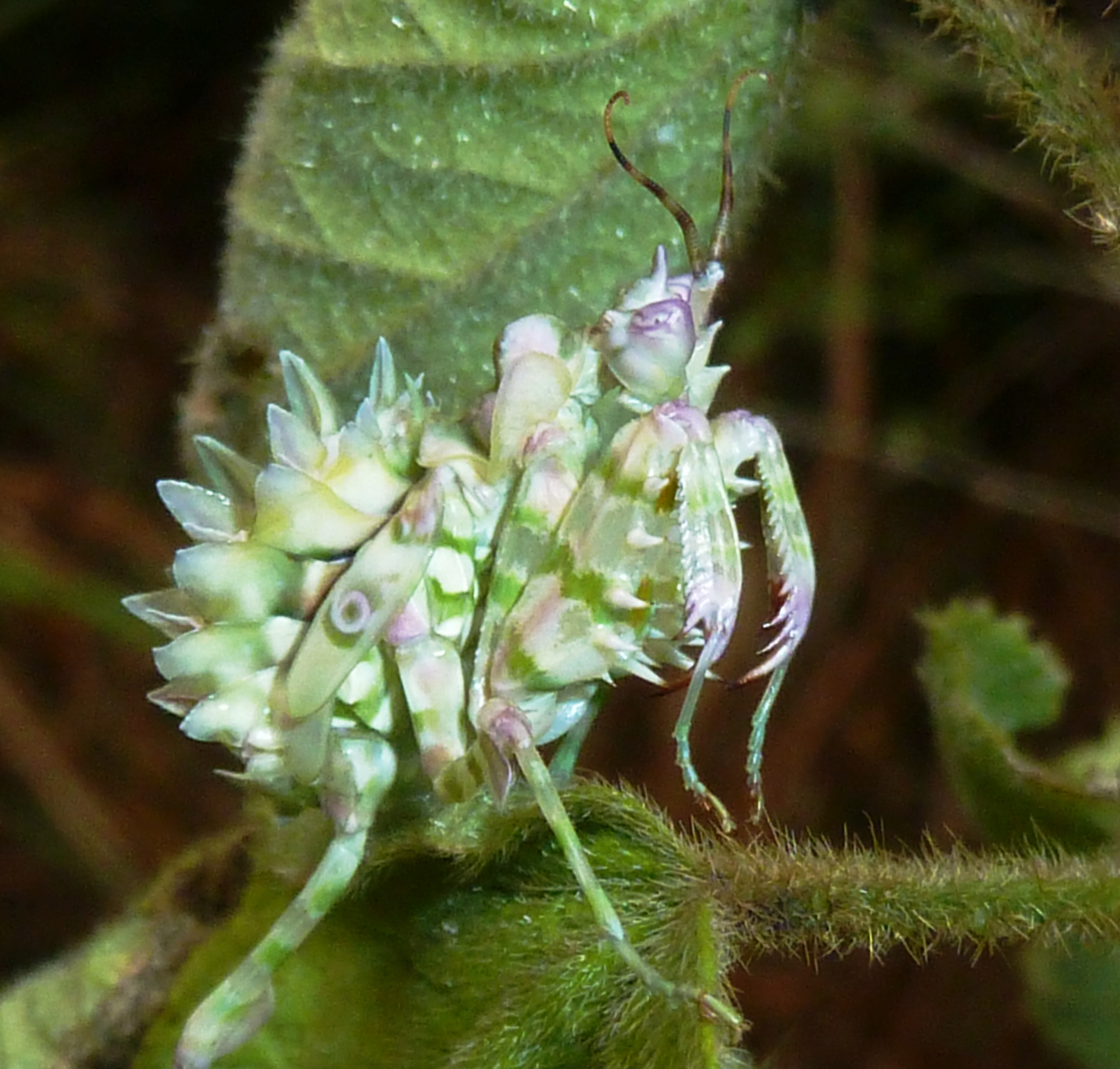
- Adult and nymph

Scientific classification
- Kingdom: Animalia
- Phylum: Arthropoda
- Clade: Pancrustacea
- Class: Insecta
- Order: Mantodea
- Family: Hymenopodidae
- Genus: Pseudocreobotra
- Species: P. wahlbergi

Binomial name
- Pseudocreobotra wahlbergi Stål, 1871

= Pseudocreobotra wahlbergi =

Spiny flower mantis

Species of praying mantis

Pseudocreobotra wahlbergi, or the Spiny flower mantis, is a small flower mantis (40 millimetres or 1 1/2 inches) native to southern and eastern Africa.

== Taxonomy ==
The species was described by Carl Stål in 1871. Giglio-Tos lists works by Saussure (1871) and Brunner (1899) that use the name Creobotra ocellata among the references for this species.

== Morphology ==
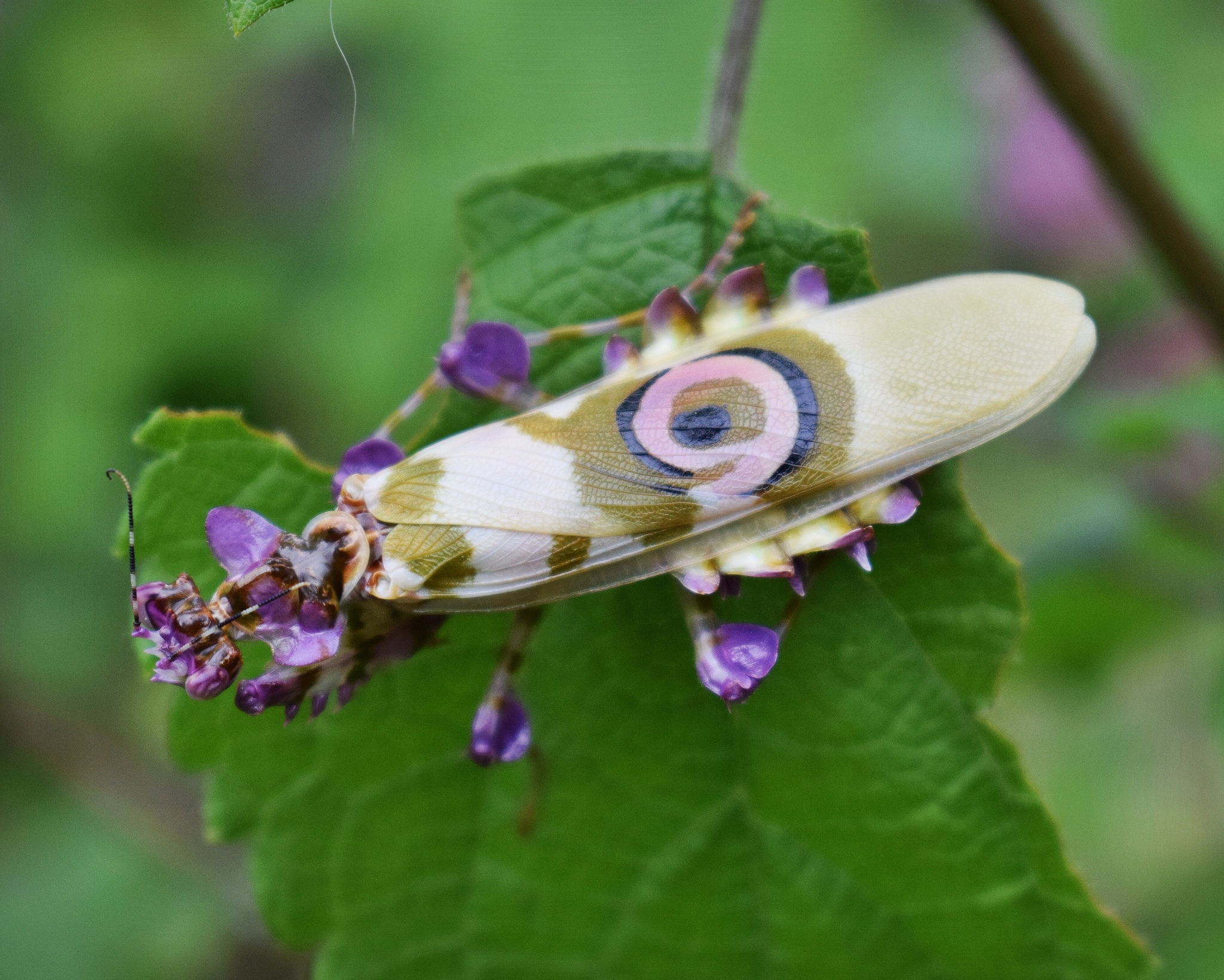

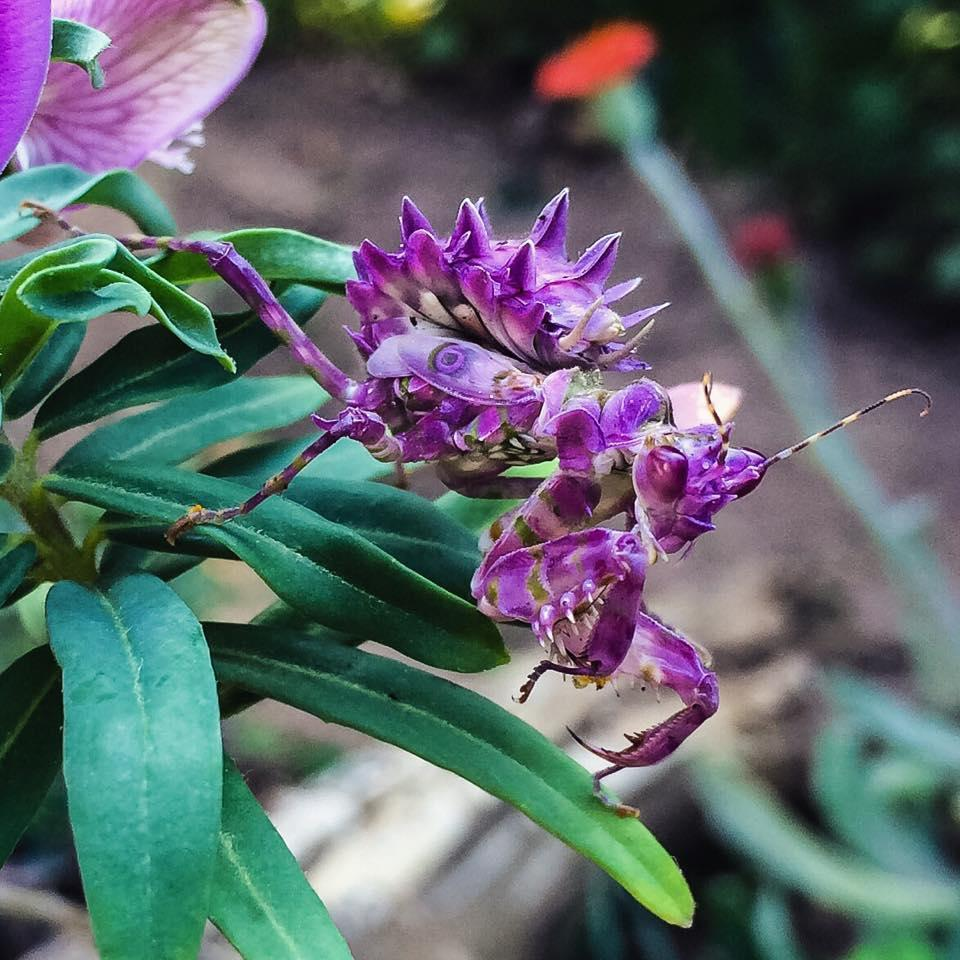
Pink adult and nymph

The adult has spiny structures on the underside of its abdomen, giving it its namesake. It has a variety of colours, being typically light green, but it can equally be tinted yellow, pink, or red. It has a large eyespot on its forewings, often nicknamed a "number nine" for its shape. The spot is black, green, and cream and surrounded by a green patch. The inner hind wings are orange and the outer hind wings are transparent. Nymphs are black until the third instar.

=== Sexual dimorphism ===
P. wahlbergi, like many praying mantises, exhibits sexual dimorphism. Females have small spines towards the base of their wings and six to seven segments on their abdomen. Females also tend to have slightly shorter antennae, and take seven moults to reach maturity. On the other hand, males lack the spines found near females' wings, have eight abdominal segments, longer wings relative to body size, longer antennae, and require six moults to reach maturity.

== Behaviour and ecology ==
P. wahlbergi has a deimatic display in which it spreads its forewings, making itself appear larger and prominently displaying its eyespots to startle would-be predators. While at rest, it is camouflaged as an aggressive mimic of a flower. It preys on insects that attempt to pollinate it. They prefer to prey on flying insects and spiders, but if unavailable, will eat virtually any insect.

Like with many mantis species, P. wahlbergi females practice sexual cannibalism; however, nymphs (young immature praying mantises) are not cannibalistic until their fourth instar.

== Life Cycle ==
- Egg stage:

Spiny flower mantis eggs are layed inside a protective frothy case called an ootheca, and hidden in places such as tree bark, branches, sticks, crevices, the undersides of leaves, and other shelters. A single mantis ootheca can be nearly three times the size of the female, and yeilds around 30-55 Nymph eggs. They will generally develop for around 4 to 6 weeks before hatching.

- Early nymph stages (L1-L2):

When the Nymphs first hatch, they are tiny- only around 4 to 6 mm long, about the size of a small ant! In their first instar, the nymphs are jet black, and through their earliest molts they stay mostly dark. During this period, they eat small prey like Drosophila melanogaster fruit flies.

- Mid-Nymph stages (L3-L4):

The mantises begin to develop their bright patterns, lobes, and early signs of wing and body markings. By the third or fourth instar, the nymphs' sex can be determined by the count of abdominal segments or underside lobes (males have more compared to females). Prey usually increases in size, typically stepping up to larger fruit flies such as Drosophila hydei, and cannibalism risk heightens.

- Pre-Subadult and Subadult stages (L5-L6)

Through these phases, the mantis' wing buds appear and swell, their coloration and features become much more pronounced, and their prey shifts to predominantly green bottle flies, blue bottle flies, houseflies, black soldier flies, and small moths.

- Adult stage:

After the final molt, full wings and adult coloration are completely present. When courting, the females will emit pheromones, often during the night or at dusk, and the males will locate the female by tracing the pheromones with their long, sensitive antennae. After mating, the female stops signaling and typically lays her first ootheca within a few days to about three weeks after. A single mating can fertilize several oothecae of eggs.

== See also ==
- List of mantis genera and species
- Flower mantis
