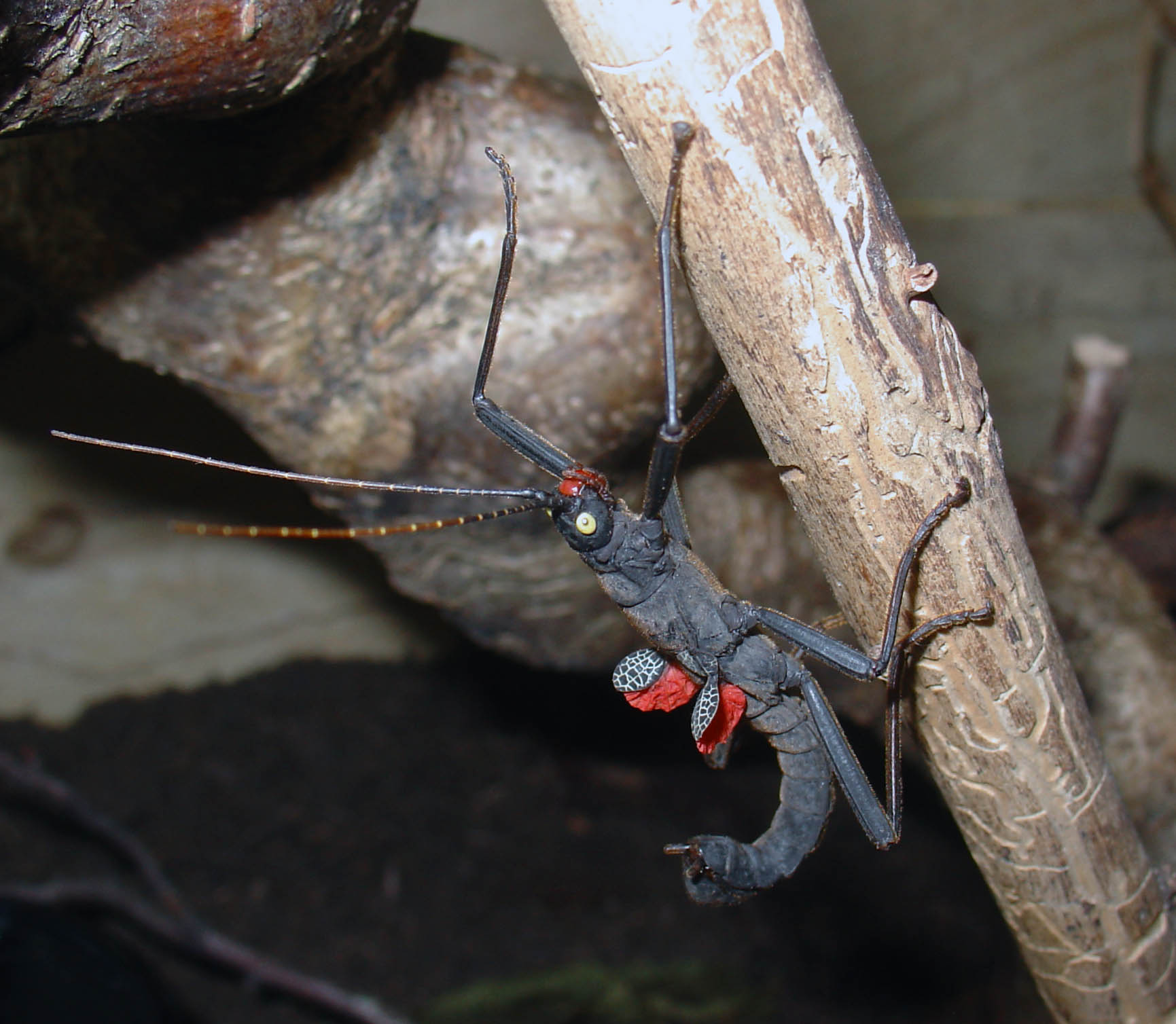
- Male
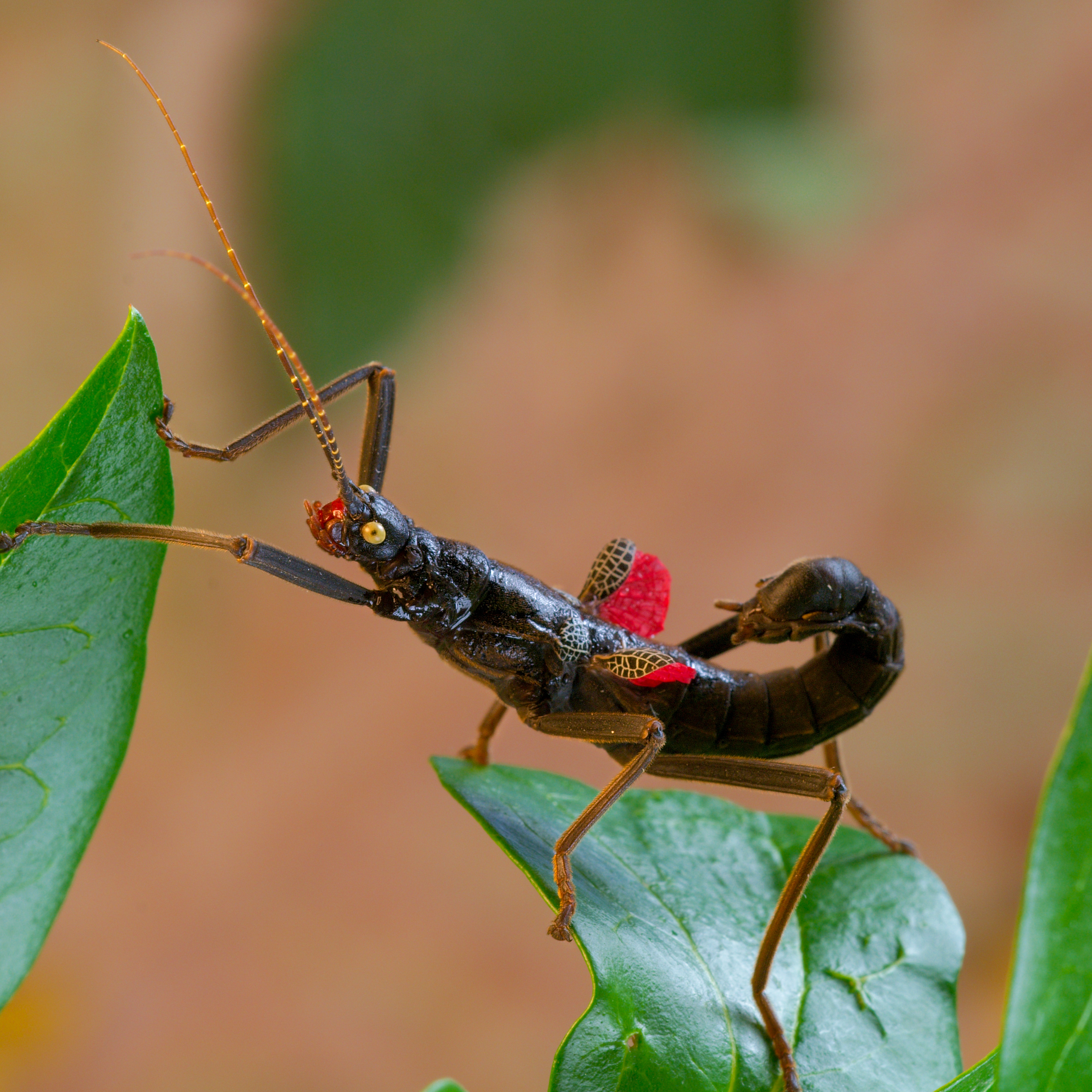

Conservation status
- Critically Endangered (IUCN 3.1)

Scientific classification
- Kingdom: Animalia
- Phylum: Arthropoda
- Clade: Pancrustacea
- Class: Insecta
- Order: Phasmatodea
- Family: Pseudophasmatidae
- Genus: Peruphasma
- Species: P. schultei

Binomial name
- Peruphasma schultei Conle & Hennemann, 2005
- IUCN range Extant (resident)

= Peruphasma schultei =

Species of stick insect

Peruphasma schultei, known as the black beauty stick insect and the golden-eyed stick insect, is a species of phasmid found in the Cordillera del Condor region of northern Peru. In the wild the insect feeds on Schinus plants, but will feed on privet, Aucuba japonica and honeysuckle in captivity. In Peru they are only known to exist in a region of less than 5 hectares, usually on volcanoes or mountains, but since their discovery they have become increasingly popular as pets worldwide due to their unusual colouration and they are now bred regularly in captivity.

== Description ==
A large and compact species, females can reach 5.5 cm (2.2 in) and are larger than males, which measure 3.8 to 4.3 cm (1.5 to 1.7 in). They have a black body, yellow eyes and red/brownish mouth parts, with adults having bright red vestigial wings. When disturbed, adults of this species are able to spray a defensive liquid from glands at the rear of the head which can be irritating to the skin and eyes.

== Habitat ==
P. schultei has been found in regions like the Cerro Casapita, which consists of grasslands and other vegetation the species is known to live in. The species best thrives in grassland and forest habitats, however they cannot handle pasturelands.

== Conservation status ==
The insect is listed on the IUCN Red List as critically endangered and was last updated in May 2018. Since then, their population has been actively decreasing. While no direct conservation efforts have been made for the species themselves, they are known to inhabit at least three known protected areas that were created for the preservation of the endangered Marañon poison frog.

=== Threats ===
Multiple threats to Peruphasma schultei are the result of human activities. These include habitat loss due to converting land for agriculture and livestock farming. There are also natural threats from wildfires.

== Etymology ==
This species is named after Rainer Schulte, who collected the original specimens. One of its common names that is listed under the IUCN red list is the Golden-Eyed Stick Insect.

== Gallery ==
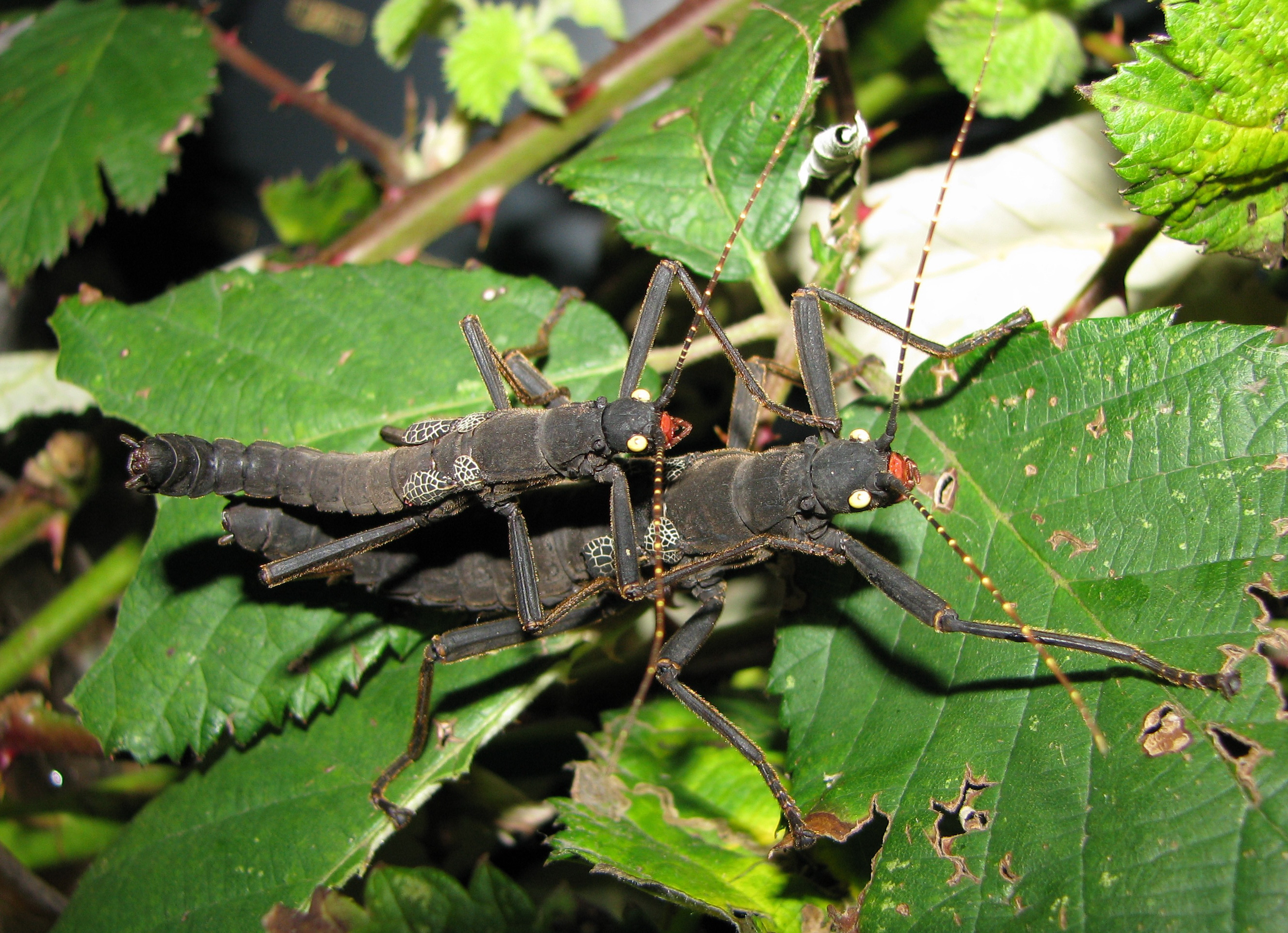
Pair

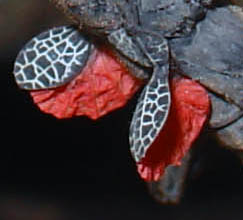
Hindwing

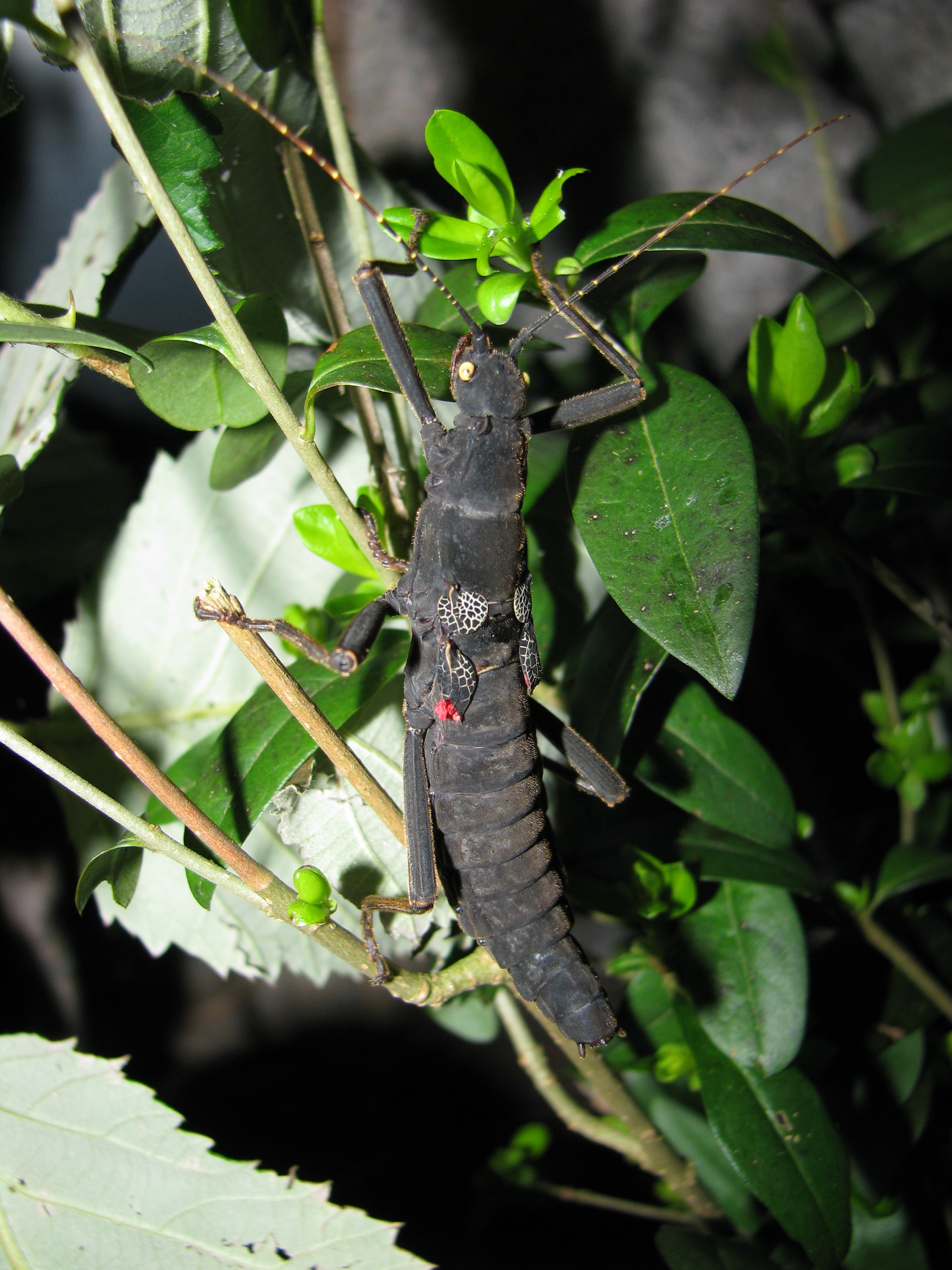
Female

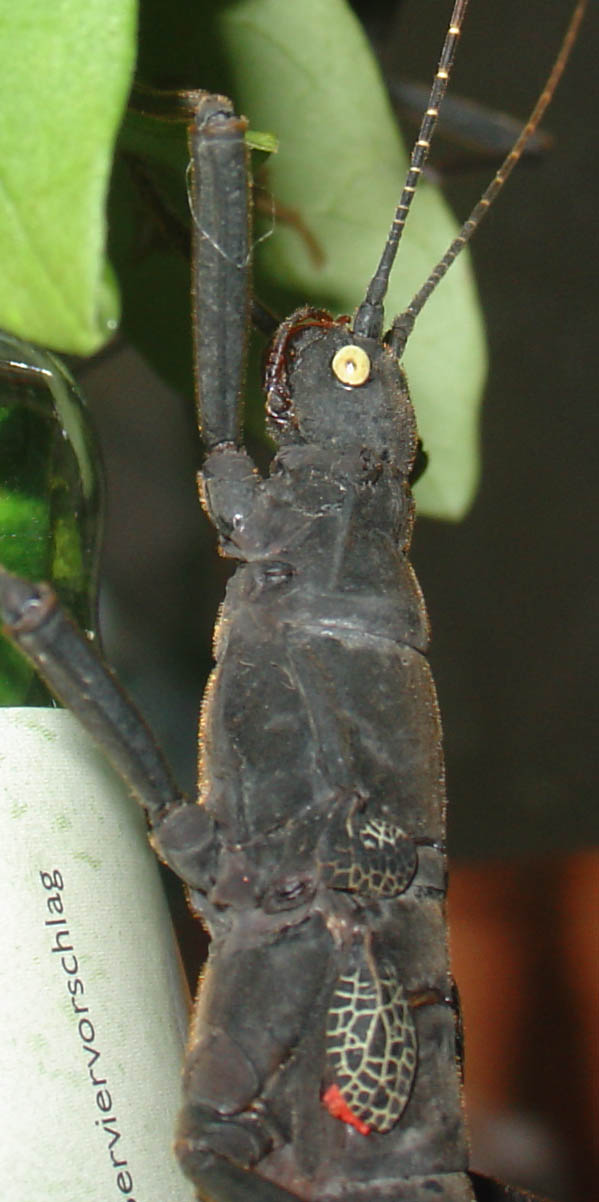
Illustration of a female

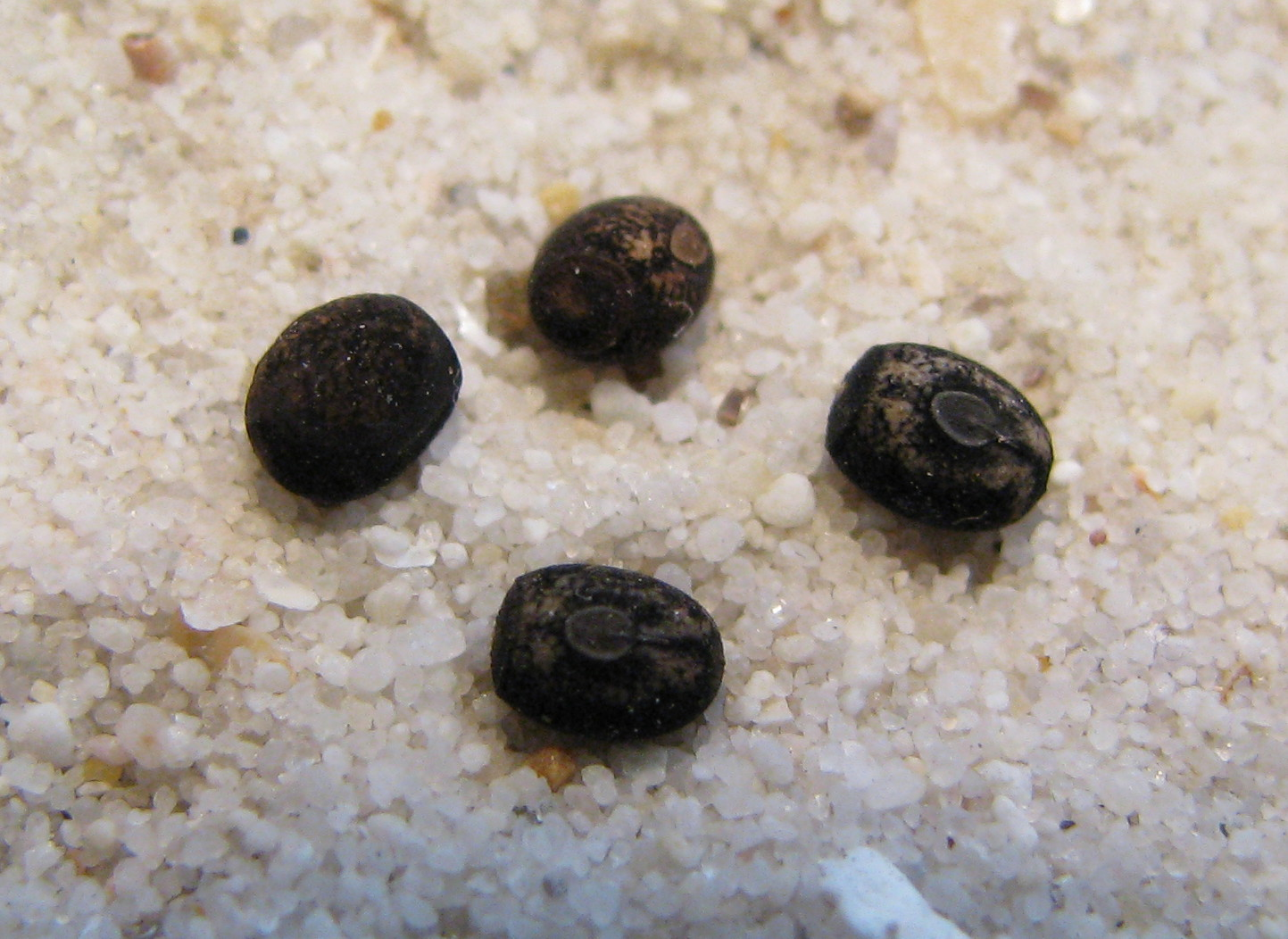
Eggs
