= Physalaemus deimaticus =

Conservation status
- Least Concern (IUCN 3.1)

Scientific classification
- Kingdom: Animalia
- Phylum: Chordata
- Class: Amphibia
- Order: Anura
- Family: Leptodactylidae
- Genus: Physalaemus
- Species: P. deimaticus

Binomial name
- Physalaemus deimaticus Sazima and Caramaschi, 1988

Species of frog

Physalaemus deimaticus is a species of frog in the family Leptodactylidae. It is endemic to Brazil and occurs in the Espinhaço Mountains of Minas Gerais; prior to 2020, it was only known from its type locality in Jaboticatubas, Serra do Cipó, Minas Gerais. The specific name deimaticus is derived from Greek deimos fror "fear" and refers to the defensive display of this frog, probably aimed at scaring predators. Common names Jaboticatubas dwarf frog and frightening foam froglet have been coined for it.

Location of the type locality for Physalaemus deimaticus

== Description ==
The type series consists of three specimens. The holotype is an adult female measuring 24 mm (0.9 in) in snout–vent length. The other female type is of similar size, whereas the male type measures 21 mm (0.8 in) in snout–vent length. The overall appearance is robust. The snout is short. No tympanum is visible. The fingers and the toes are long and have neither webbing nor expanded tips. The dorsum has granulose skin and is light gray to light reddish brown in color. The interorbital stripe, middorsal stripe that splits in two posteriorly, and lateral bands are dark brown. The inguinal glands are black with white margins.

== Behavior ==
When threatened, this species performs a "deimatic" display in which it swells up its body, lowers its head, and raises its rump, such that the two large inguinal glands resembling eye spots are exposed. Physalaemus nattereri is known to perform a similar display.

== Habitat and conservation ==
Physalaemus deimaticus is terrestrial frog known from rocky areas at about 800 m (2,600 ft) above sea level. It probably breeds in water. It appears to adapt well to modified habitats, and its only expected threat is due to localised mining operations. Its range overlaps with some protected areas, including the Serra do Cipó National Park and the Parque Nacional Das Sempre Vivas.
