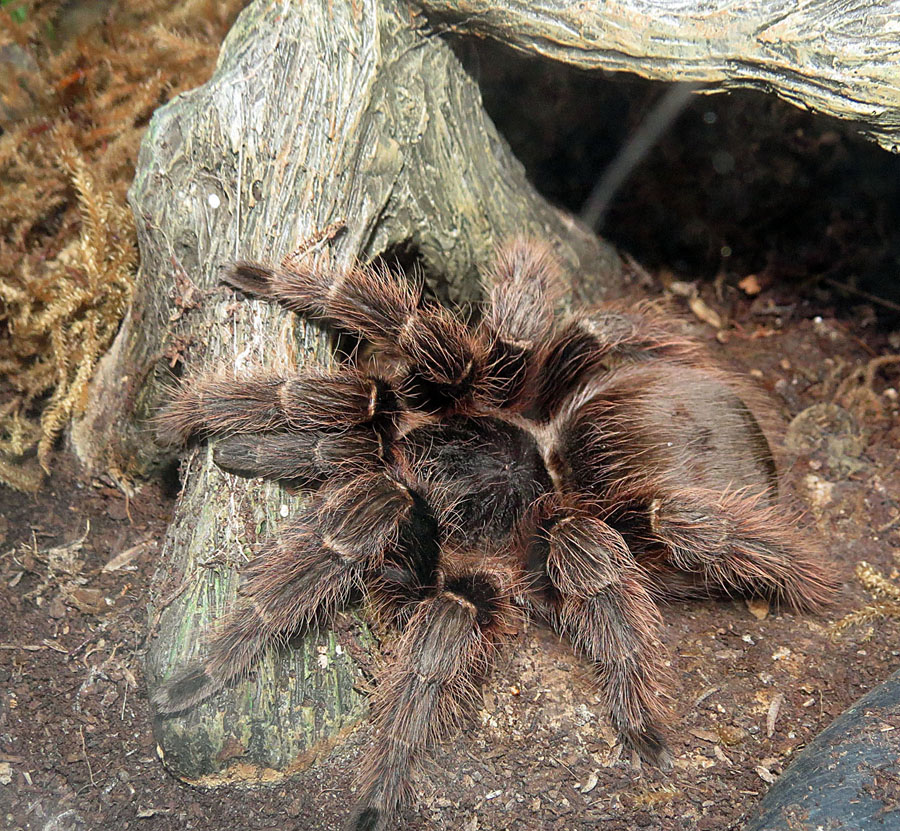

Scientific classification
- Kingdom: Animalia
- Phylum: Arthropoda
- Subphylum: Chelicerata
- Class: Arachnida
- Order: Araneae
- Infraorder: Mygalomorphae
- Family: Theraphosidae
- Genus: Eupalaestrus
- Species: E. campestratus

Binomial name
- Eupalaestrus campestratus (Simon, 1891)

= Eupalaestrus campestratus =

Pink zebra beauty

Species of spider

Eupalaestrus campestratus, known as the pink zebra beauty, is a terrestrial tarantula native to Brazil, Paraguay, and Argentina. It is dark brown and has yellow striped markings near its patellae, resembling Grammostola pulchripes, although its maximum leg span of six inches makes it significantly smaller. It is known for its generally docile and tolerant temperament, and is therefore an attractive pet tarantula to hobbyists who prefer these traits. It is slow moving and generally considered hardy in captivity.
