= Eupalaestrus crassimetatarsis =

Scientific classification
- Kingdom: Animalia
- Phylum: Arthropoda
- Subphylum: Chelicerata
- Class: Arachnida
- Order: Araneae
- Infraorder: Mygalomorphae
- Family: Theraphosidae
- Genus: Eupalaestrus
- Species: E. crassimetatarsis

Binomial name
- Eupalaestrus crassimetatarsis Borges, Paladini & Bertani, 2021

Species of tarantula

Eupalaestrus crassimetatarsis is a tarantula in the genus Eupalaestrus. It was first described by Leandro Malta Borges, Andressa Paladini, and Rogério Bertanii in 2021. It is found in Paraná, Brazil and Argentina.
