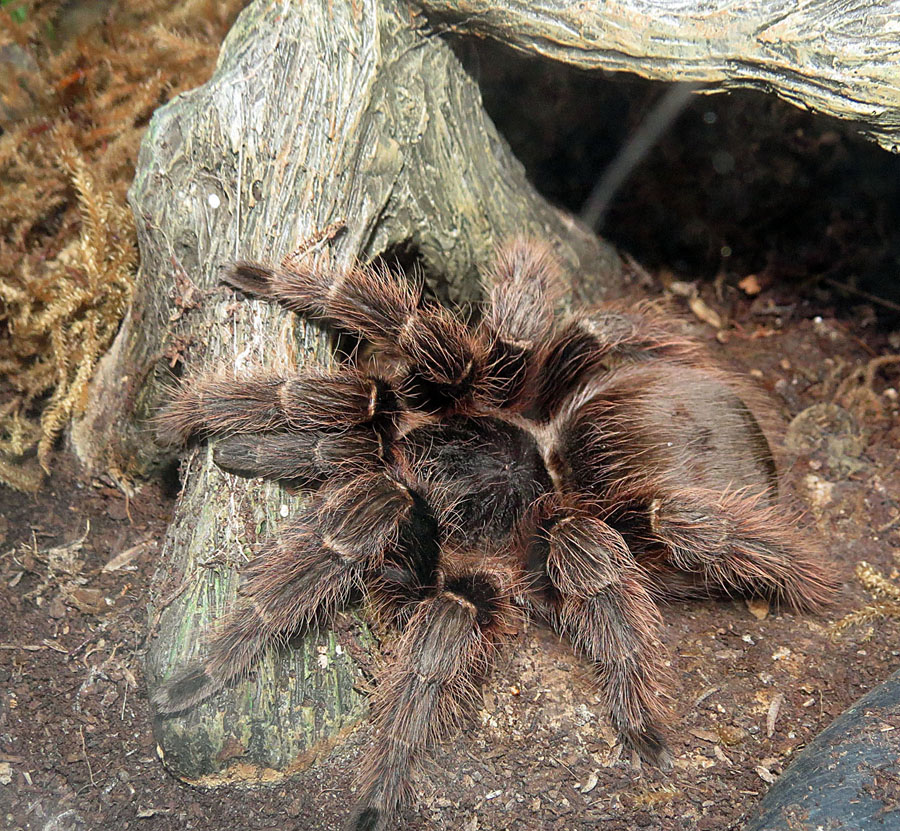
- female E. campestratus
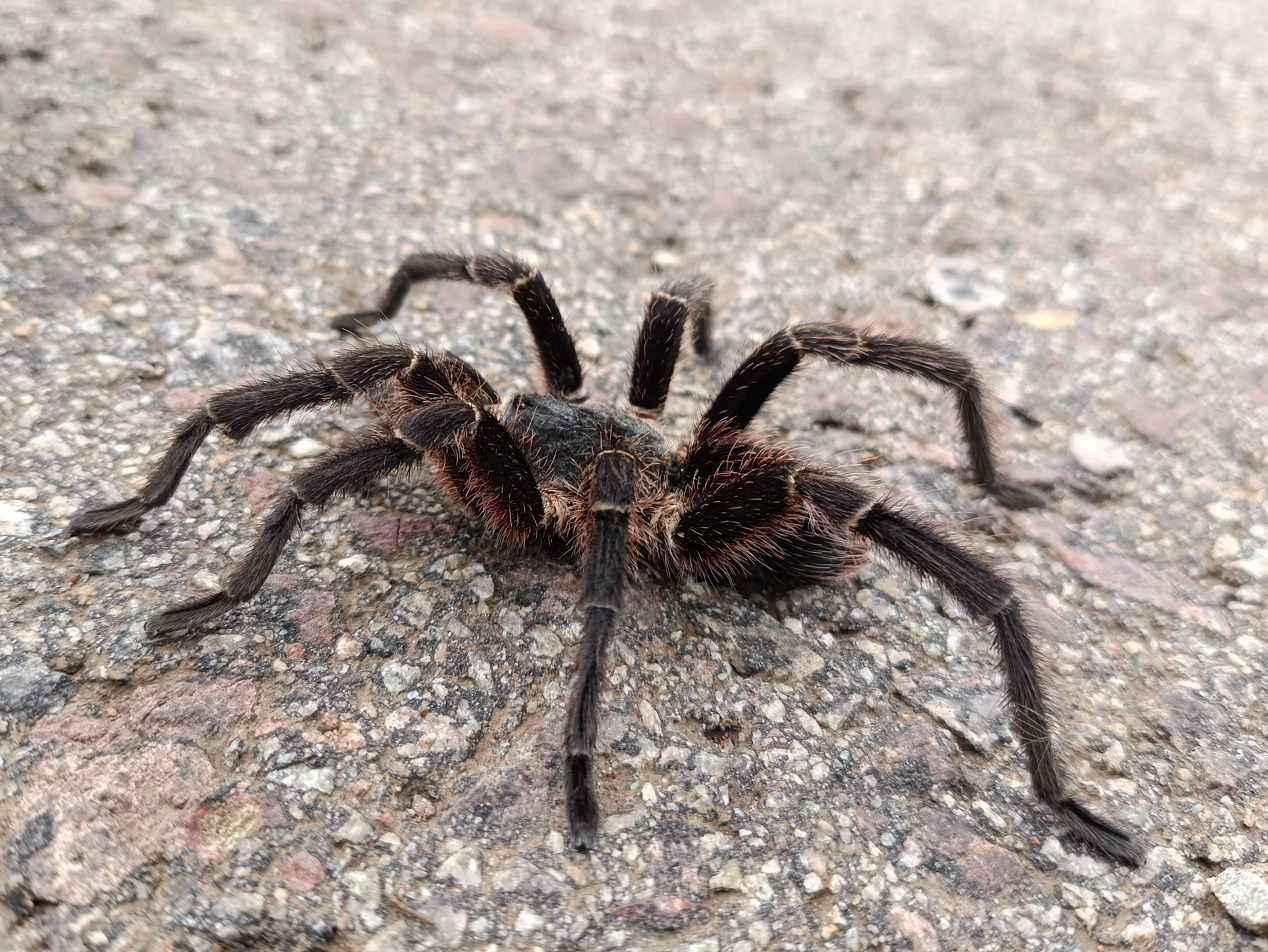
- male E. weijenberghi

Scientific classification
- Kingdom: Animalia
- Phylum: Arthropoda
- Subphylum: Chelicerata
- Class: Arachnida
- Order: Araneae
- Infraorder: Mygalomorphae
- Family: Theraphosidae
- Genus: Eupalaestrus; Pocock, 1901

Type species
- E. campestratus (Simon, 1891)

Species
- 6, see text

Synonyms
- Weyenberghiana Mello-Leitão, 1941

= Eupalaestrus =

Genus of spiders

Eupalaestrus is a genus of South American tarantulas that was first described by Reginald Innes Pocock in 1901.

== Distribution ==
Spiders in this genus are found in Uruguay, Argentina, Paraguay, and Brazil:

== Species ==
As of October 2025, this genus includes six species:

- Eupalaestrus anomalus (Mello-Leitão, 1923) – Brazil
- Eupalaestrus campestratus (Simon, 1891) – Brazil, Paraguay, Uruguay, Argentina (type species)
- Eupalaestrus crassimetatarsis Borges, Paladini & Bertani, 2021 – Brazil, Argentina
- Eupalaestrus larae Ferretti & Barneche, 2012 – Argentina
- Eupalaestrus roccoi Borges, Paladini & Bertani, 2021 – Brazil
- Eupalaestrus weijenberghi (Thorell, 1894) – Brazil, Uruguay, Argentina

In synonymy:

- E. guyanus (Simon, 1892) = Eupalaestrus campestratus (Simon, 1891)
- E. holophaeus (Mello-Leitão, 1923, removed from S of Vitalius cesteri (Mello-Leitão, 1923), contra Bücherl, 1947a: 258, sub Pamphobeteus) = Eupalaestrus spinosissimus Mello-Leitão, 1923
- E. pugilator Pocock, 1901 = Eupalaestrus campestratus (Simon, 1891)
- E. riparius (Schmidt & Bolle, 2008) = Eupalaestrus weijenberghi (Thorell, 1894)
- E. saltator (Pocock, 1903) = Eupalaestrus weijenberghi (Thorell, 1894)
- E. tarsicrassus Bücherl, 1947 = Eupalaestrus spinosissimus Mello-Leitão, 1923
- E. tennuitarsus Bücherl, 1947 = Eupalaestrus campestratus (Simon, 1891)
